= Nageshwar Jyotirlinga =

Hindu temple in Gujarat, India

Nageshwar Temple
- Nageshwar Jyotirlinga
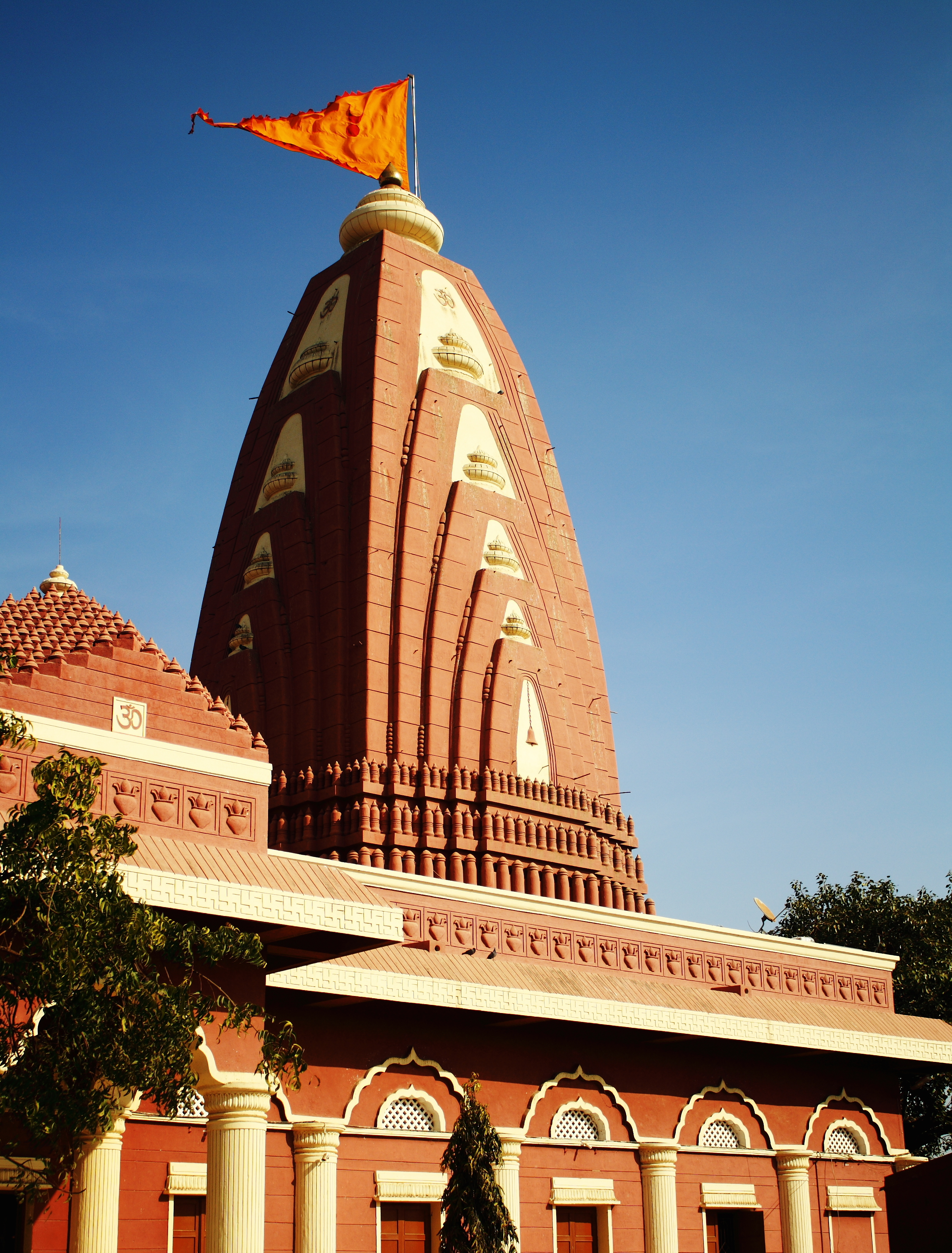
- Nageshwar Jyotirling Dwarka Gujarat

- NageshwarJyotirlinga location in India

Religion
- Affiliation: Hinduism
- District: Devbhumi Dwarka
- Deity: Shiva
- Festival: Maha Shivaratri

Location
- Location: Dwarka
- State: Gujarat
- Country: India
- Coordinates: 22.3359°N 69.0869°E

Architecture
- Temple: 8668856667

Website
- www.nageshwarjyotirling.com

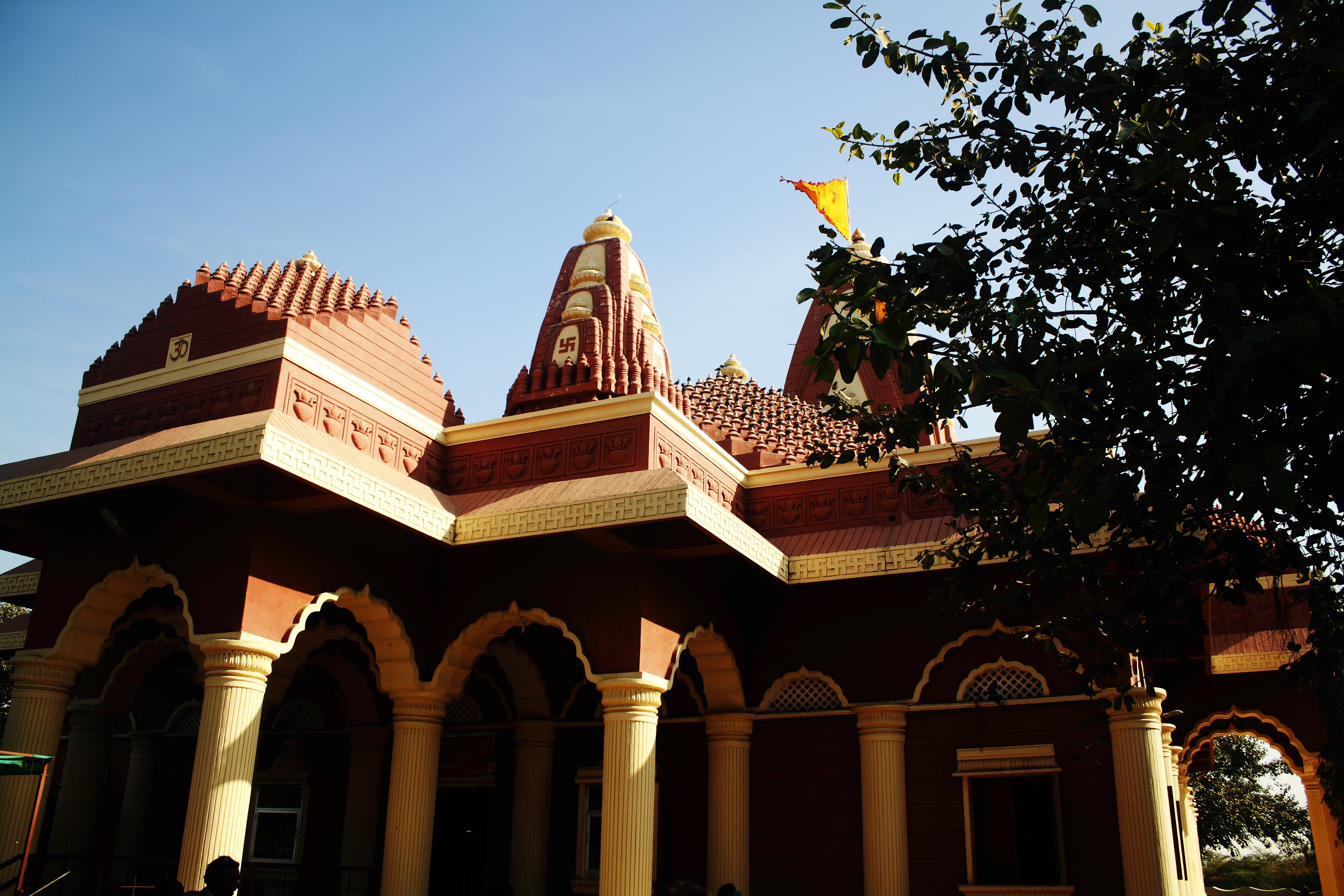
Nageshwar Jyotirling

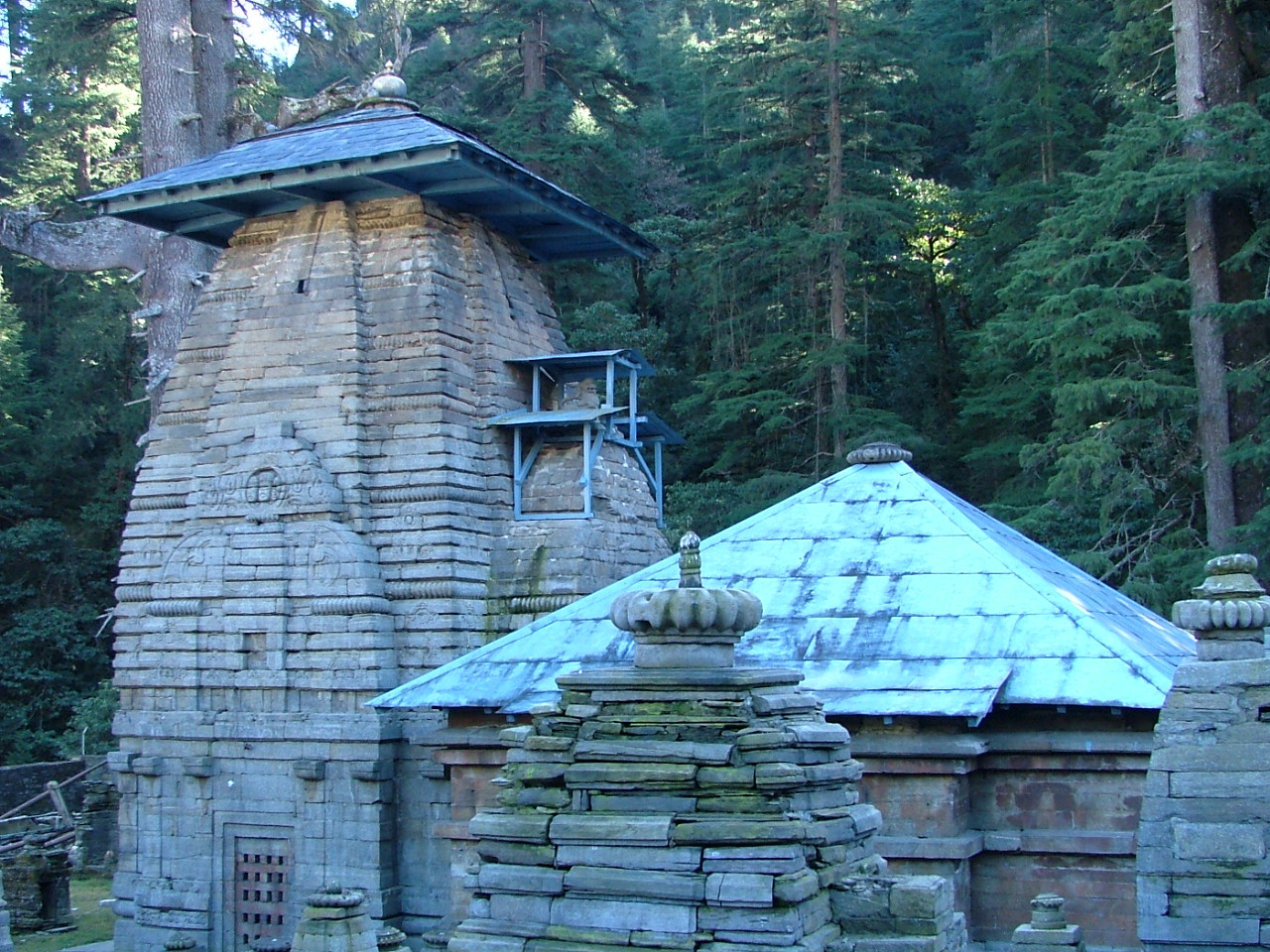
The temples at Jageshwar, in the background of Darukavana, the holy Deodar forest.

Nageshwar Temple is a Hindu temple dedicated to the Hindu god Shiva located on Dwarka, Gujarat, India. It is one of the legendary temples mentioned in the Shiva Purana and one of the twelve Jyotirlingas.

== Jyotirlinga ==
According to the Shiva Purana, Brahma and Vishnu once had a disagreement about which of them were supreme. To test them, Shiva pierced the three worlds as an immeasurable pillar of light, the Jyotirlinga. Vishnu and Brahma parted company to determine the extent of each end of the pillar. Brahma, who had set off upward, lied that he had discovered the upper end of the pillar, but Vishnu, who had gone in the direction of the base of the pillar, admitted that he had not. Shiva then appeared as a second Jyotirlinga and cursed Brahma, telling him that he would have no place in the ceremonies. The Jyotirlinga is the supreme indivisible reality from which Shiva appears. Jyothirlinga shrines commemorate this time when Shiva appeared. It was believed that there were originally sixty-four jyotirlingas. Twelve are considered to be especially auspicious and holy. Each of the twelve sites takes the name of the presiding deity and each is considered a separate manifestation of Shiva. At all these sites, the primary deity is a lingam representing the beginning less and endless Stambha pillar, symbolizing Shiva's infinite nature. The twelve jyothirlinga are Somnath at Veraval in Gujarat, Mallikarjuna at Srisailam in Andhra Pradesh, Mahakaleswar at Ujjain in Madhya Pradesh, Omkareshwar in Madhya Pradesh, Kedarnath in Uttarakhand , Bhimashankar in Maharashtra, Viswanath at Varanasi in Uttar Pradesh, Triambakeshwar in Maharashtra, Vaidyanath at Deoghar in Jharkhand, Nageshvara in Gujarat, Rameshwar at Rameswaram in Tamil Nadu and Grishneshwar at Chhatrapati Sambhaji Nagar in Maharashtra.

Nageshvara Jyotirlinga is situated in the Daarukavanam forest in Gujarat.

== Legend ==
The Shiva Purana says Nageshvara Jyotirlinga is in 'the Darukavana', which is an ancient name of a forest in India. 'Darukavana' finds mention in Indian epics, such as Kamyakavana, Dvaitavana, Dandakavana.

A narrative in the Shiva Purana about the Nageshvara Jyotirlinga tells of a demon named Daruk, who attacked a Shiva devotee named Supriya and imprisoned him along with many others in his city of Darukavana, a city under the sea inhabited by sea snakes and demons. At the urgent exhortations of Supriya, the prisoners started to chant the holy mantra of Shiva and immediately thereafter Shiva appeared and the demon was vanquished, later residing there in the form of a Jyotirlinga. The demon had a wife, a demoness named Daruka who worshipped Parvati. As a result of her penance and devotion, Parvati enabled her to master the forest where she performed her devotions, and renamed the forest 'Darukavana' in her honour. Wherever Daruka went the forest followed her. In order to save the demons of Darukavana from the punishment of the gods, Daruka summoned up the power Parvati had given her. She then moved the entire forest into the sea where they continued their campaign against the hermits, kidnapping people and keeping them confined in their new lair under the sea, which was how that great Shiva devotee, Supriya, had wound up there.

The arrival of Supriya caused a revolution. He set up a lingam and made the prisoners recite the mantra Om Namah Shivaya in honour of Shiva while he prayed to the lingam. The demons' response to the chanting was to attempt to kill Supriya, though they were thwarted when Shiva appeared and handed him a divine weapon that saved his life. Daruka and the demons were defeated and Parvati saved the remaining demons. The lingam that Supriya had set up was called Nagesha; it is the tenth lingam. Shiva once again assumed the form of a Jyotirlinga with the name Nageshwar, while the Goddess Parvati was known as Nageshwari. Shiva then announced that he would show the correct path to those who would worship him.

== Location controversy ==
The Shiva Purana indicates that the location was on Western (Arabian) Sea. In Kotirudra Samhita, Chapter 29, the following shloka says

पश्चिमे सागरे तस्य वनं सर्वसमृद्धिमत् ।
योजनानां षोडशभिर्विस्तृतं सर्वतो दिशम् ॥ ४ ॥

The actual location of the legendary forest of Darukavana is still debated. No other important clues indicate the location of the Jyotirlinga. 'Darukavana' on the Western Sea remains the only clue.

The name Darukavana, named after Queen Daruka, is possibly derived from daruvana (forest of deodar trees, or simply, forest of wood), is thought to exist in Almora. Deodar (daru vriksha) is found abundantly only in the western Himalayas, not in peninsular India. Deodar trees have been associated with Shiva in ancient Hindu texts. Hindu sages used to reside and perform meditation in deodar forests to please Shiva. Also, according to the ancient treatise Prasadmandanam,

"हिमाद्रेरूत्तरे पार्श्वे देवदारूवनं परम् पावनं शंकरस्थानं तत्र् सर्वे शिवार्चिताः।"

Because of this the 'Jageswara' temple in Almora, Uttarakhand is commonly identified as Nageshvara Jyotirlinga.

The written name of Darukavana could be misread as 'Dwarakavana' which would point to the Nageswara temple at Dwaraka. However, no forest is in this part of Dwaraka that finds mention in any of the Indian epics. The narratives of Shri Krishna, mention Somanatha and the adjoining Prabhasa tirtha, but not Nageswara or Darukavana in Dwaraka.

Darukavana might exist next to the Vindhya Mountains. It is south-southwest of the Vindhyas extending to the sea in the west. In the Dvadasha Jyotirlinga Stotra (6), Shankaracharya praised this Jyotirlinga as Naganath:

"Yamye sadange nagaretiramye vibhushitangam vividhaishcha bhogai Sadbhaktimuktipradamishamekam shrinaganatham sharanam prapadye"

This could be taken to mean that it is located in the south ['yamye'] at the town of 'Sadanga', which was the ancient name of Aundh in Maharashtra, south of the Jageswara shrine in Uttarakhand and west of Dwaraka Nageshvara.

== Connectivity ==
Nearest Airport: Jamnagar

Nearest Railway Station: Dwarka and Okha

== See also ==
- Dwarka
- Dwarkadhish Temple
- Somnath Temple
- Jageshwar
- Aundha Nagnath Temple

== Sources ==
- Chaturvedi, B. K. (2006), Shiv Purana (First ed.), New Delhi: Diamond Pocket Books (P) Ltd, p. 58, ISBN 81-7182-721-7
- Eck, Diana L. (1999), Banaras, city of light (First ed.), New York: Columbia University Press, p. 107, ISBN 0-231-11447-8
- Gwynne, Paul (2009), World Religions in Practice: A Comparative Introduction, Oxford: Blackwell Publication, p. 271, ISBN 978-1-4051-6702-4
- Harding, Elizabeth U. (1 January 1998). Kali: The Black Goddess of Dakshineswar. Motilal Banarsidass. ISBN 978-81-208-1450-9.
- Lochtefeld, James G. (2002), The Illustrated Encyclopedia of Hinduism: A-M, Rosen Publishing Group, p. 122, ISBN 0-8239-3179-X
- Venugopalam, R. (2003), Meditation: Any Time Any Where (First ed.), Delhi: B. Jain Publishers (P) Ltd., p. 133, ISBN 81-8056-373-1
- Vivekananda, Swami. "The Paris Congress of the History of Religions". The Complete Works of Swami Vivekananda. Vol. 4.
