= Mallikarjuna Temple, Srisailam =

Hindu temple in Andhra Pradesh

Mallikarjuna Swamy Temple
- Mallanna
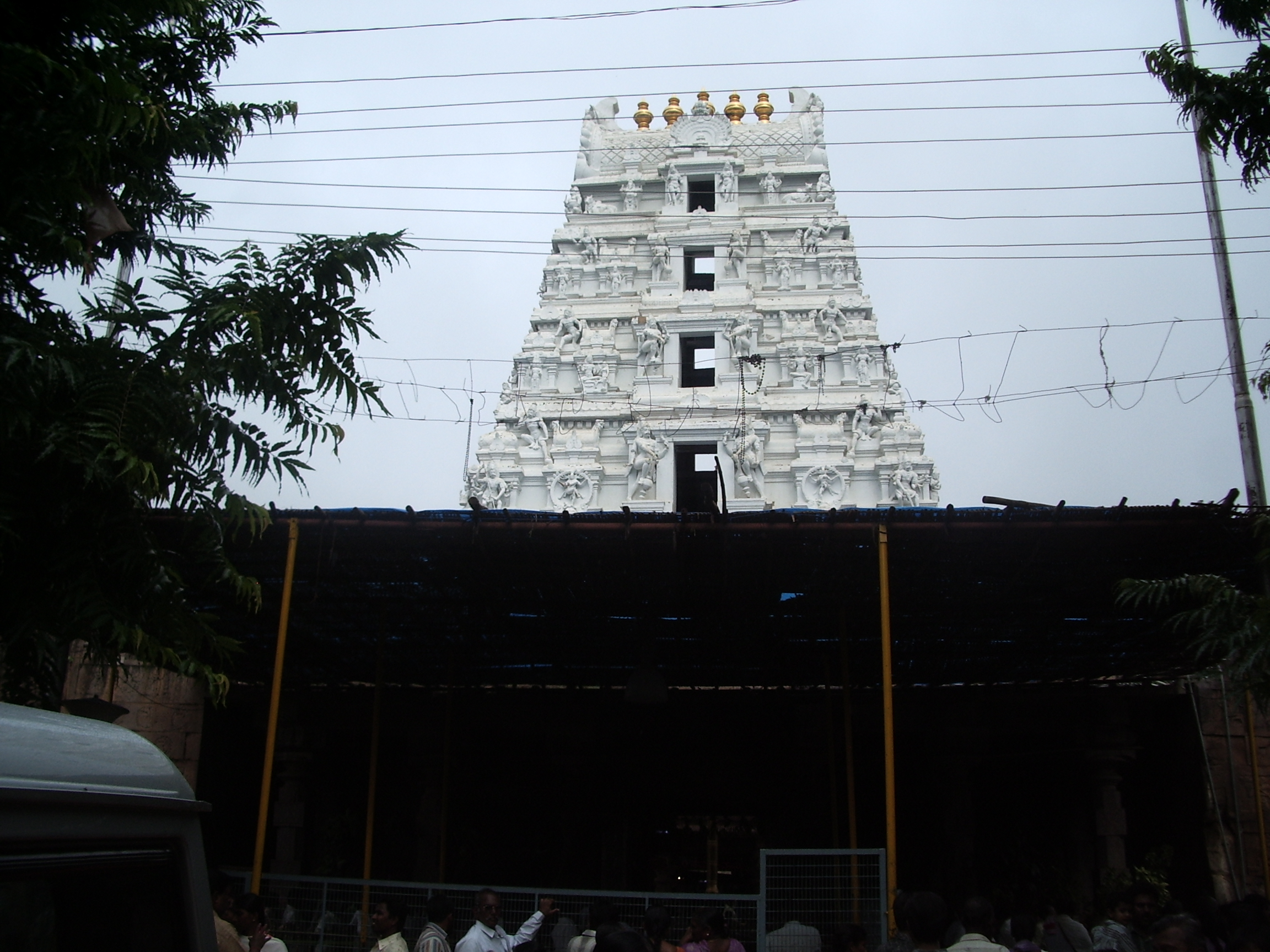
- Gold plated Vimana of Mallikarjuna shrine on the top-middle left, along with other shrines and devotees.

- Location in Andhra Pradesh

Religion
- Affiliation: Hinduism
- District: Nandyal
- Deity: Mallikarjuna(Shiva), Bhramaramba(Parvati)
- Festival: Maha Shivaratri

Location
- Location: Srisailam
- State: Andhra Pradesh
- Country: India
- Coordinates: 16°04′27″N 78°52′05″E

Architecture
- Temple: 1

Website
- https://www.srisailadevasthanam.org/en-in/home

Mallikarjuna Swamy Temple or Srisailam Temple is a Hindu temple dedicated to the deities Shiva and Parvati, located at Srisailam, Nandyal district in the Indian state of Andhra Pradesh. It is significant to the Hindu sects of both Shaivism and Shaktism as this temple is referred to as one of the twelve Jyotirlingas of Shiva and one of the 276 Paadal Petra Sthalams of Shiva, as well as one of the fifty two Shakta pithas, centres of the Hindu goddess. Shiva is worshiped as Mallikarjuna and is represented by the lingam. His consort Parvati is depicted as Bhramaramba.

== Legend ==
When Shiva and Parvati decided to find suitable brides for their sons. Shiva got Riddhi (intellect) and Siddhi (spiritual power) married to Ganesha. Kartikeya on his return was enraged and went away to stay alone on Mount Krauncha in Palani in the name of Kumara brahmachari. On seeing his father coming over to pacify him, he tried to move to another place, but on the request of the Devas, stayed close by. The place where Shiva and Parvati stayed came to be known as Srisailam.

According to Hindu legend, the presiding deity in the form of Linga (an iconic form of Shiva) was worshipped with jasmine (locally called in Telugu as Mallika), leading to the name Mallikarjuna.

== History ==
There are inscriptional evidence from the Satavahana dynasty which place the temple to be existent from the 2nd century. Most modern additions were done during the time of king Harihara I of Vijayanagara Empire (14th and 15th centuries). The veerasheromandapam and paathalaganga steps was constructed during the time of Vhanni Reddi Kingdom (12th and 13th centuries). The reddi dynasty were committed devotees of Sri Bhramarambha Mallikarjuna Swamy.

== Architecture ==
The temple complex covers two hectares and houses four gateway towers known as gopurams. The temple has numerous shrines, with those of Mallikarjuna and Bhramaramba being the most prominent. The temple complex houses many halls; the most notable is the Mukha Mandapa built during the Vijayanagar period. The temple is situated facing east. The center mandapam has several pillars, with a huge idol of Nadikeshwara. The temple is enclosed by tall walls measuring 183 m (600 ft) by 152 m (499 ft) and 8.5 m (28 ft) tall. There are a number of sculptures in the precinct each rising above another. The Mukamandapa, the hall leading to the sanctum, has intricately sculpted pillars. The shrine where Mallikarjuna is housed is considered the oldest in the temple, dating back to the 7th century. There is a Sahasra linga (1000 linga), believed to have been commissioned by Rama and five other lingams believed to have been commissioned by Pandavas. A mirror hall in the first precinct has images of Nataraja.

== Administration ==
The temple is maintained and administered by government of Andhra Pradesh.

The nearest railway station are Markapur is 85 km, Nandyal and Kurnool are the places the distance is 180 km.

== Religious significance ==
Shiva in this temple is referred to as one of the twelve Jyotirlingas. Goddess Bramarambha's shrine is referred to as one of the fifty-two Shakta pithas. This temple is classified as one of the Paadal Petra Sthalam according to the Tamil Shaiva canon Tirumurai.

On the way to the main temple is located Shikhareshwaram temple. It is said that by having darshan in the temple one does not get rebirth.

Krishna River here is called Patal Ganga and 852 stairs have to be taken to reach the river. The Shiva Linga is bathed in the water of this river.

=== Jyotirlinga ===
As per Siva Mahapuranam, once Brahma (the Hindu God of creation) and Vishnu (the Hindu God of preservation) had an argument in terms of supremacy of creation. To test them, Shiva pierced the three worlds as a huge endless pillar of light, the jyotirlinga. Vishnu and Brahma split their ways to downwards and upwards respectively to find the end of the light in either directions. Brahma lied that he found out the end, while Vishnu conceded his defeat. Shiva appeared as a second pillar of light and cursed Brahma that he would have no place in ceremonies while Vishnu would be worshipped till the end of eternity. The jyotirlinga is the supreme partless reality, out of which Shiva partly appears. The jyotirlinga shrines, thus are places where Shiva appeared as a fiery column of light. Originally there were believed to be 64 jyotirlingas while 12 of them are considered to be very auspicious and holy. Each of the twelve jyotirlinga sites take the name of the presiding deity – each considered different manifestation of Shiva. At all these sites, the primary image is lingam representing the beginningless and endless Stambha pillar, symbolizing the infinite nature of Shiva. The twelve jyotirlinga are Somnath at Veraval in Gujarat, Mallikarjuna at Srisailam in Andhra Pradesh, Mahakaleswar at Ujjain in Madhya Pradesh, Omkareshwar in Madhya Pradesh, Kedarnath in Uttarakhand, Bhimashankar in Maharashtra, Viswanath at Varanasi in Uttar Pradesh, Triambakeshwar in Maharashtra, Baidyanath at Deoghar district in Jharkhand, Nagnath at Dwarka in Gujarat, Rameshwar at Rameswaram in Tamil Nadu and Grishneshwar at Chhatrapati Sambhajinagar in Maharashtra.

=== Shakta pitha ===
Srisailam Sri Mallikarjuna Swamy Temple is one of the 18 Maha Shakta pitha. Goddess Bhramari or Bhramaramba( bhramaramika) is the residing goddess.The legend of Daksha Yaga and Sati's self-immolation resulted in the emergence of Sri Parvati in the place of Sati Devi and making Shiva a householder. This mythology is the story behind the origin of Shakta pithas. They are holy abodes of Adiparashakti formed due to the falling of Sati Devi's corpse when Shiva carried it and wandered. It is believed that Sati Devi's neck has fallen here.

== Connectivity ==
Srisailam Sri Mallikarjuna Swamy Temple is located around 180 kilometers from the Kurnool district headquarters, and 213 kilometers from Hyderabad. Pilgrims coming by train would need to alight at the railway station in either Markapur or Tarlupadu. These stations are between 2 and 2.5 hours by road. The Kacheguda-Guntur passenger passes through the Giddalur railway station that is 139 kilometers from the temple.

Nearest Railway Station: Markapur

Nearest Airport: Kurnool, Hyderabad

== See also ==
- List of temples of Bhramari devi
