= Shri Mahakal Mahalok =

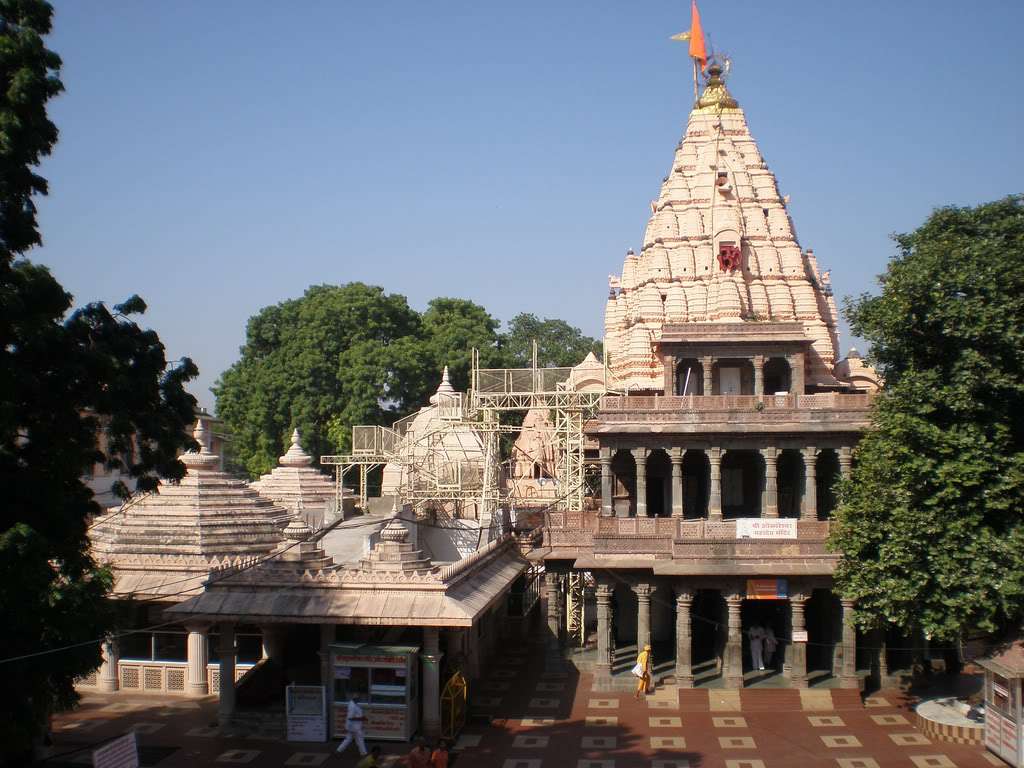
- Mahakaleshwar Temple, in whose premises Shri Mahakal Mahalok has been built

Religion
- Affiliation: Hinduism
- Deity: Shiva / Shankar / Mahakaleshwar

Location
- Location: Ujjain, Madhya Pradesh, India
- Interactive map of Shri Mahakal Mahalok

Architecture
- Style: Hindu architecture
- Established: 11 October 2022

Website
- http://www.mahakaleshwar.nic.in

Shri Mahakal Mahalok is a temple complex surrounding the Mahakaleshwar temple in Ujjain, India. The complex has been expanded from 2.87 hectares (7.1 acres) to 47 hectares (116 acres). The estimated cost of the project exceeds ₹856 crore (US$100 million). It is dedicated to Shiva, one of the major deities in Hinduism, and aims to create a grand and immersive spiritual experience for devotees. The project is being developed by the Government of Madhya Pradesh and will be completed in phases by 2025.

Shri Mahakal Mahalok features an array of 108 "Pillars of Divine Light", a grand entrance, free circulation space around the temple, and murals depicting stories from the Shiva Purana. The complex also includes a museum that showcases the life and legends of Shiva. Shri Mahakal Mahalok was inaugurated on 11 October 2022 by Prime Minister Narendra Modi. The project aims to boost tourism in Ujjain and establish it as one of the most significant pilgrimage sites in Hinduism.

The project includes expansion and beautification of the existing Mahakal temple complex along with the creation of new infrastructure and facilities. The Mahakal Museum is dedicated to the history and significance of the Mahakal Temple. It houses collections of artifacts, sculptures, and paintings related to Shiva and the temple. The Mahakal Auditorium is a large auditorium for cultural and religious events.
