= Daruka =

Name of multiple characters in Hindu epic Mahabharat

Daruka is the name of two major characters in Hindu epic Mahabharat:

Daruka (Sanskrit: दारुक, romanized: Dāruka) refers to the charioteer of the deity Krishna.

Dārukā (Sanskrit: दारुका, romanized: Dārukā) refers to the name of a rakshasi.

== Charioteer Daruka ==
The epic Mahabharata features Daruka as the charioteer of Krishna. Described to be skilled at his task, he appears during a number of chapters of the text. Daruka is assailed by King Shalva's arrows when he attacks Dvaraka after the death of his ally, Shishupala. During the Kurukshetra War, hearing Krishna's conch, he brings his chariot to the battlefield. He drives Satyaki's chariot when the warrior fights against Karna, demonstrating excellent manoeuvrability. Krishna bids Daruka to inform his family at Dvaraka and the Pandavas at Indraprastha of the death of the Yaduvamsha clan, after his chariot ascends to the heavens.

== Rakshasa Daruka ==
The Shiva Purana features the rakshasi Dārukā and her husband, a rakshasa named Dāruka, who terrorised the forest named after them, called the Darukavana. Dārukā is stated to have acquired a boon from the goddess Parvati, upon which she grew arrogant and reckless. The inhabitants of the forest sought the assistance of the sage Aurva, who declared that any rakshasa who attacked them further upon the earth would perish. The devas, led by Indra, started to wage war on the beings. To save the race from extermination, Dārukā suggested that they move to an island beneath the ocean. The forest would follow with them owing to her boon, and they would not be further attacked. Now safe, the beings started to harass people who travelled upon the boats above and imprisoned them. One of the prisoners was a Shaiva devotee named Supriya. He taught the other prisoners the Panchakshara mantra of Shiva. The rakshasa Dāruka attempted to kill Supriya. Shiva appeared to rescue his devotee, slaying Dāruka with the Pashupatastra. When his wife, Dārukā, prayed to Parvati for mercy, the goddess urged her consort to spare her life. Hearing her plea, Shiva allowed her and the other rakshasas to reside in the forest. Shiva assumed the form of a Jyotirlinga with the name Nageshvara in the site, while the goddess Parvati came to be venerated as Nageshvari.

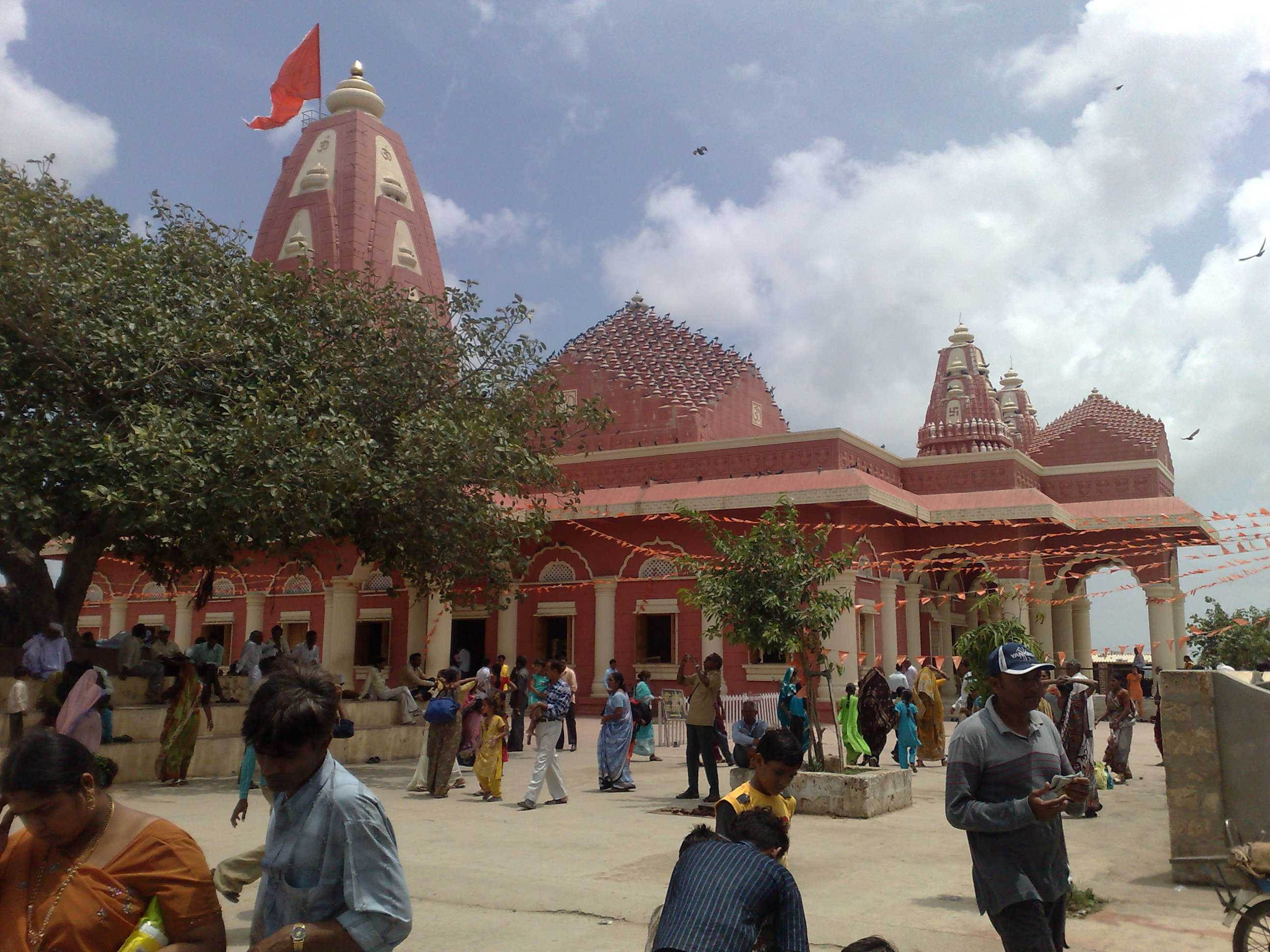
Nageshvara Jyotirlinga Temple
