= Omkareshwar Temple =

Hindu temple in Khandwa, Madhya Pradesh, India

- Omkareshwar Jyotirlinga
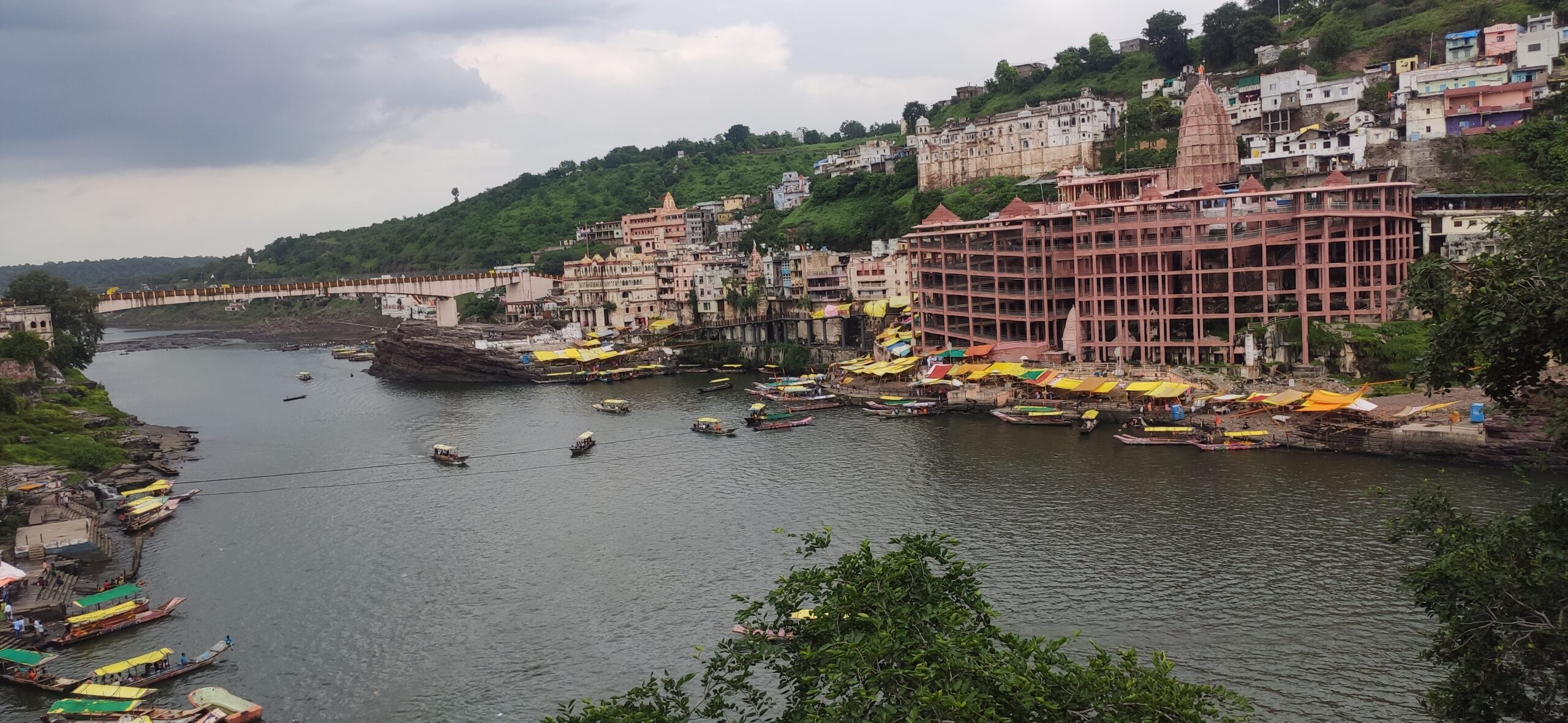
- Omkareshwar Mahadev Temple

- Location in Madhya Pradesh Omkareshwar Temple (India)

Religion
- Affiliation: Hinduism
- District: Khandwa district
- Deity: Shiva

Location
- Location: Mandhata, near Khandwa, Khandwa district, Madhya Pradesh
- State: Madhya Pradesh
- Country: India
- Coordinates: 22°14′44.1″N 76°09′03.8″E

Website
- www.shriomkareshwar.org

Omkareshwar Temple is a Hindu temple dedicated to Shiva, located in Mandhata, nearby Khandwa city in Khandwa district of the Indian state of Madhya Pradesh. It is one of the 12 revered Jyotirlinga shrines of Shiva. It is on an island called Mandhata, near Khandwa city in the Narmada River at Khandwa district in Madhya Pradesh, India; the shape of the island is said to be like the Devanagari ॐ symbol.

There are two main temples of Shiva here, one to Omkareshwar (whose name means "Lord of Omkara or the Lord of the Om sound") located in the island and one to Mamleshwar (Amaleshwar) (whose name means "Immortal Lord" or "lord of the Immortals or Devas") located on the southern bank of the Narmada River on the mainland.

Madhya Pradesh has two Jyotirlingas, the second one, Mahakaleshwar Jyotirlinga, is situated about 140 km north of Omkareshwar Jyotirlinga.

== Jyotirlinga ==
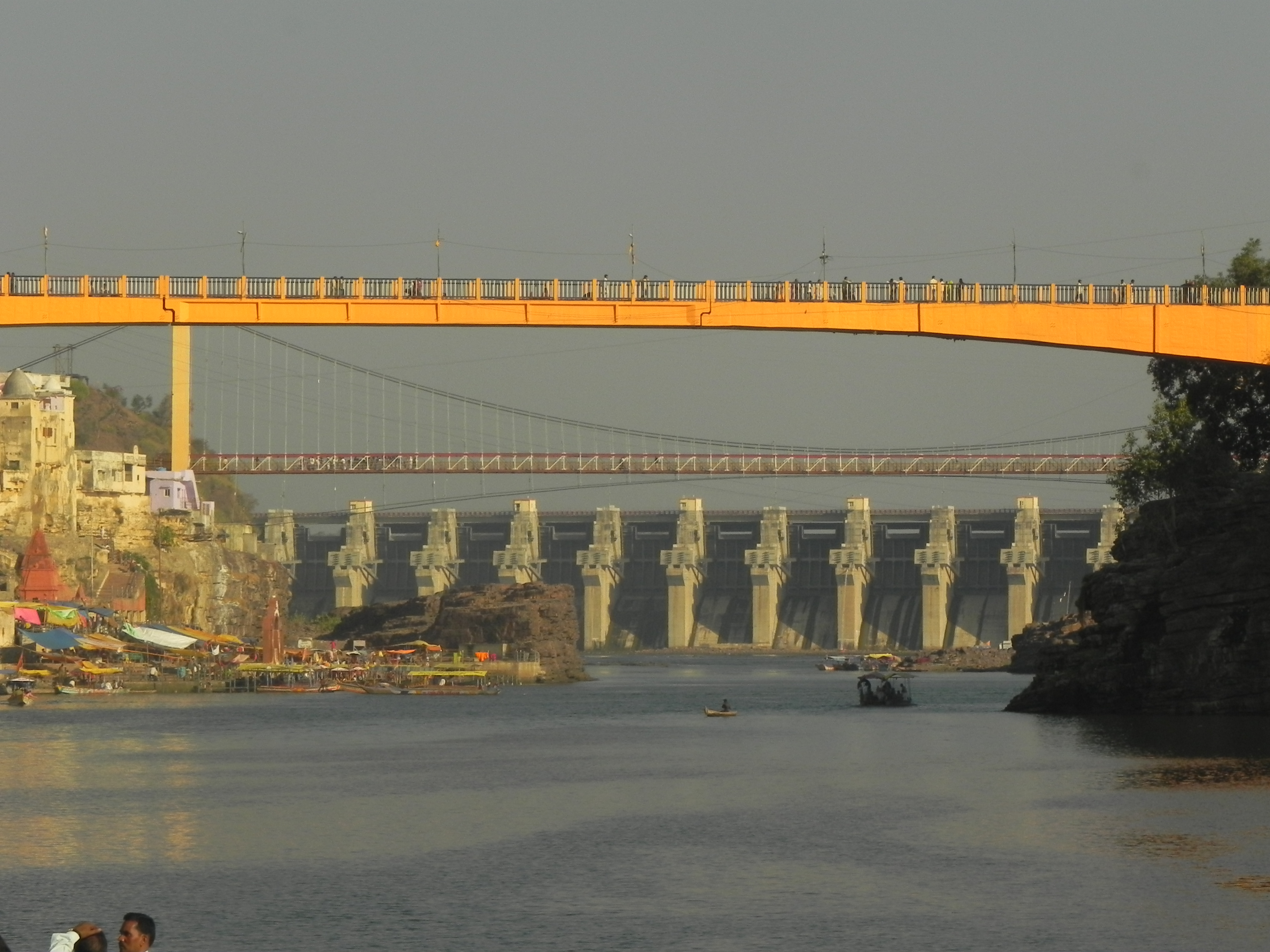
Omkareshwar Dam

According to the Shiva Purana, once, Brahma and Vishnu had an argument in terms of supremacy of creation. To test them, Shiva pierced the three worlds as a endless pillar of light, the jyotirlinga. Vishnu and Brahma split their ways to downwards and upwards respectively to find the end of the light in either directions. Brahma lied that he had discovered the end, while Vishnu conceded his defeat. Shiva appeared as the second pillar of light and cursed Brahma that he would have no place in ceremonies, while Vishnu would be worshipped until the end of eternity. The jyotirlinga shrines are believed to be those places where Shiva appeared as a fiery column of light. Originally, there were believed to be 64 jyotirlingas of which 12 of them are considered to be the holiest.

Within the Omkareshwar Temple, the jyotirlinga is described a "roundish black stone" representing the form of Shiva and near it is a white stone representing Shiva's consort, Parvati.

The twelve jyotirlingas are Somnath at Veraval in Gujarat, Mallikarjuna at Srisailam in Andhra Pradesh, Mahakaleshwar at Ujjain in Madhya Pradesh, Omkareshwar in Madhya Pradesh, Kedarnath in Himalayas in Uttrakhand State, Bhimashankar in Maharashtra, Kashi Viswanath at Varanasi in Uttar Pradesh, Triambakeshwar in Maharashtra, Baidyanath Temple at Deoghar in Jharkhand, Nageshwar at Dwarka in Gujarat, Rameshwara at Rameswaram in Tamil Nadu and Grishneshwar at Sambhajinagar in Maharashtra.

== Legend ==
As per a Hindu legend, Vindhya, the deity controlling the Vindhyachal mountain range was worshipping Shiva to propitiate himself from the sins committed. He created a sacred geometrical diagram and a Lingam made of sand and clay. Shiva was pleased with the worship and believed to have appeared in two forms, namely Omkareshwar and Amaleswara. Since the mud mound appeared in the form of Om, the island came to be known as Omkareswar. There is a shrine for Parvati and Ganapati in the temple.

The second story relates to Mandhata and his son's penance. King Mandhata of Ikshvaku clan (an ancestor of Ram) worshipped Shiva here until the Lord manifested himself as a Jyotirlinga. Some scholars also narrate the story about Mandhata's sons-Ambarish and Muchukunda, who had practiced severe penance and austerities here and pleased Shiva. Because of this, the mountain is named Mandhata.

The third story from Hindu scriptures reveals that there was a great war between the Devas (gods) and Danavas (demons), in which the Danavas won. This was a major setback for Devas and hence Devas prayed to Shiva. Pleased with their prayer, Shiva emerged in the form of Omkareshwar Jyotirlinga and defeated Danavas.

Adi Shankara's Cave – Omkareshwar is said to be the place where Adi Sankara met his guru Govinda Bhagavatpada in a cave. This cave can be found even today just below the Shiva temple where an image of Adi Shankara has been installed.

== History ==
The temple is said to have been built by the Paramara Kings of Malwa in the 11th century CE. After the Paramara kings, the administration of the temple was taken over by the Chauhan rulers. In the 13th century CE, the temple suffered destruction and loot by Muslim invaders starting with Mahmud Ghazni. Nevertheless, the temple remained intact without complete destruction. The temple was under the Chauhan Kings during the entire Mughal rule, without much renovation. In the 18th century, the temple was rebuilt by the Holkar rulers. The construction of the same was started by the first Holkar Queen, Gautama Bai Holkar, and later completed by her daughter-in-law Devi Ahilyabai Holkar. The temple came under the British rule during the colonial era. After Independence in 1947, the Archaeological Survey of India (ASI) took over the responsibility of the temple with the help of the Khandwa administration.

== Location ==
It is situated in the Mandhata city (also known as Omkareshwar) in Khandwa district of Madhya Pradesh state in India. It is about 16 km from Barwaha in Madhya Pradesh. Omkareshwar is formed by the sacred river Narmada. This is one of the most sacred rivers in India and is now home to one of the world's largest solar power plant. The temple is situated on Mandhata or Shivpuri island on the banks of Narmada and Kaveri river (a tributary of Narmada). The island is 4 KM long and 2.6 km^{2} (2,600,000 m^{2}) in area and can be approached by boats and bridge.

== Connectivity ==
Nearest Airport: Indore

Nearest Railway Station: Khandwa Junction and Mhow

== Gallery ==
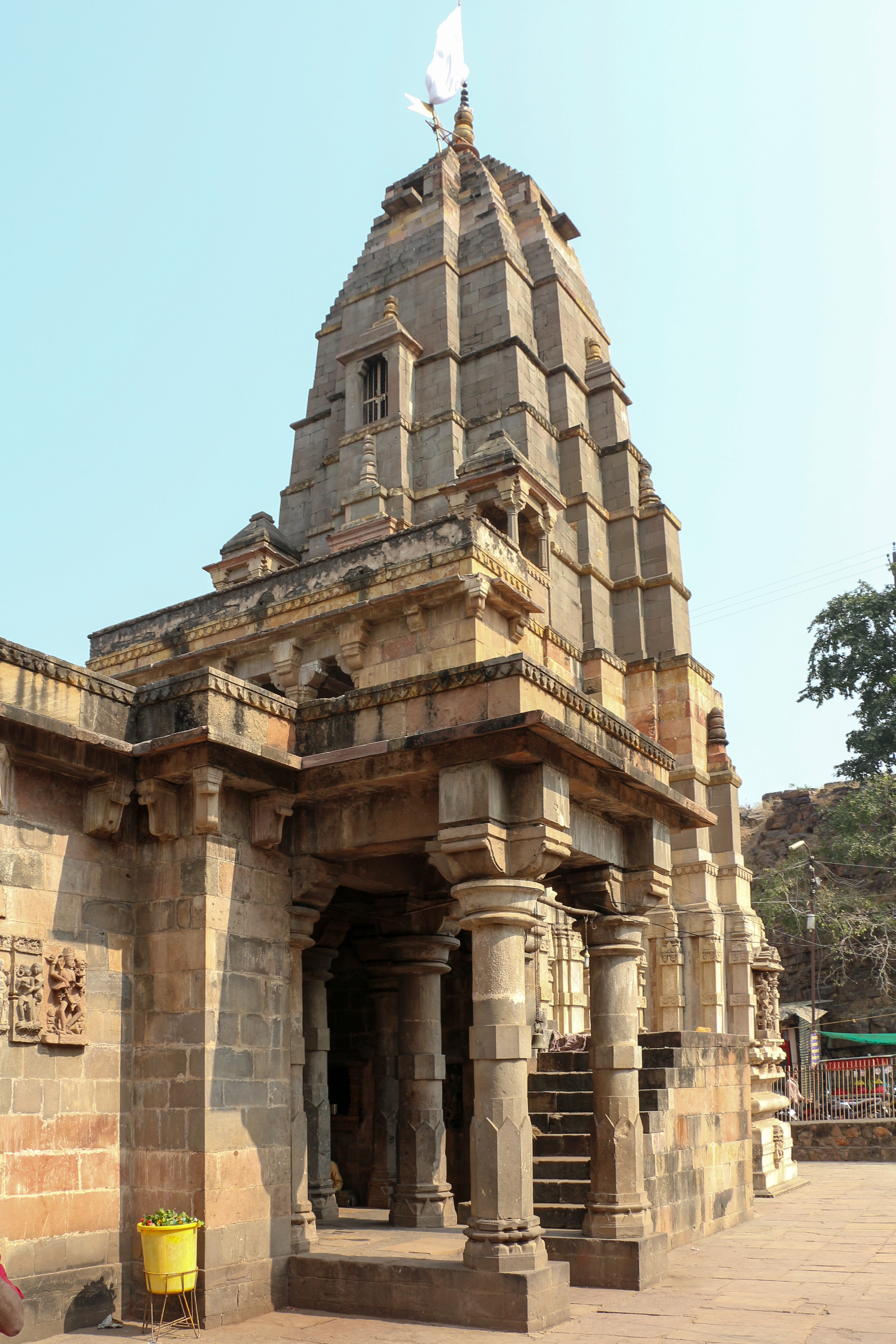
Mamleshwar Temple

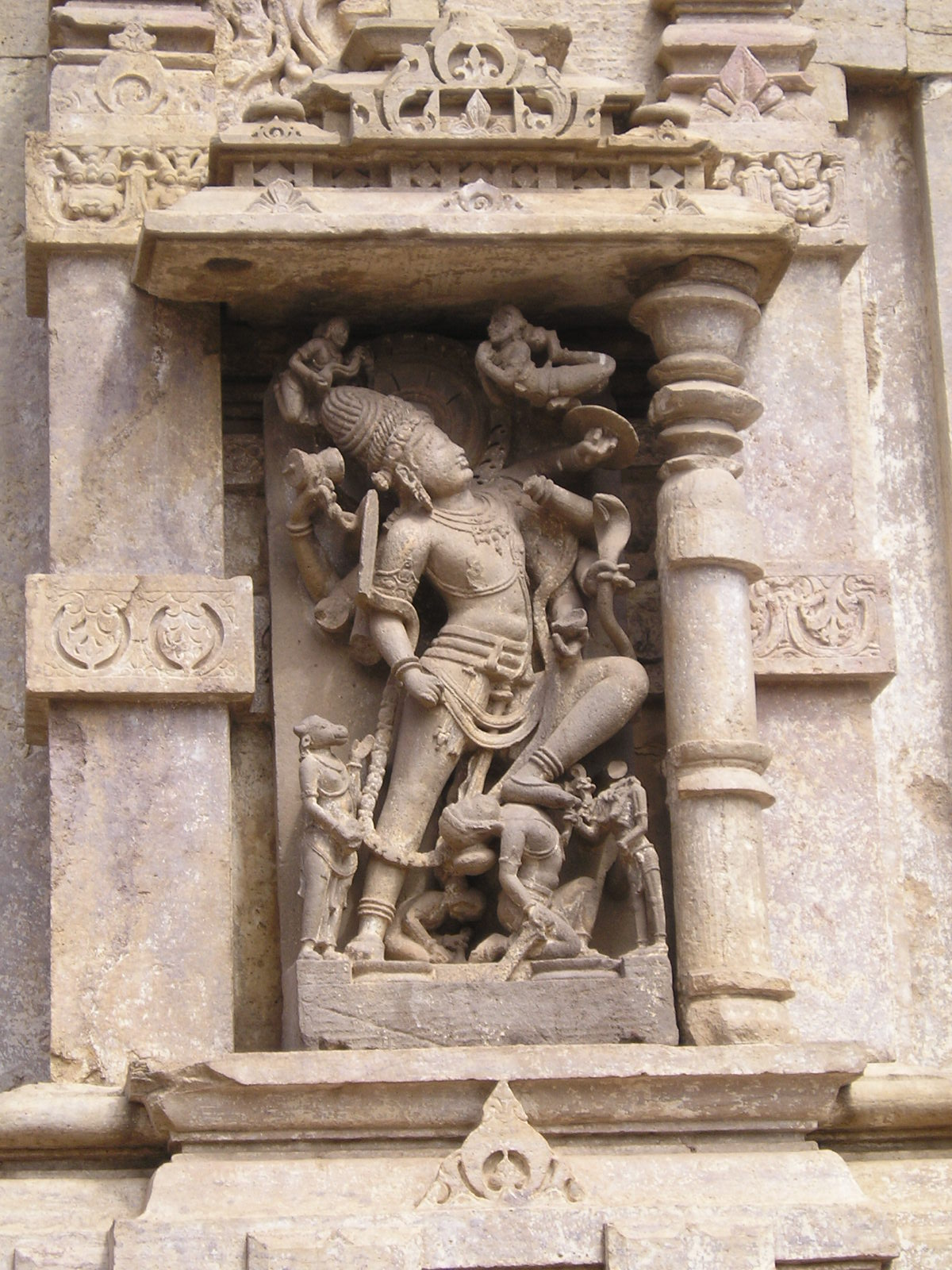
Sculpture at Mamleshwar Temple

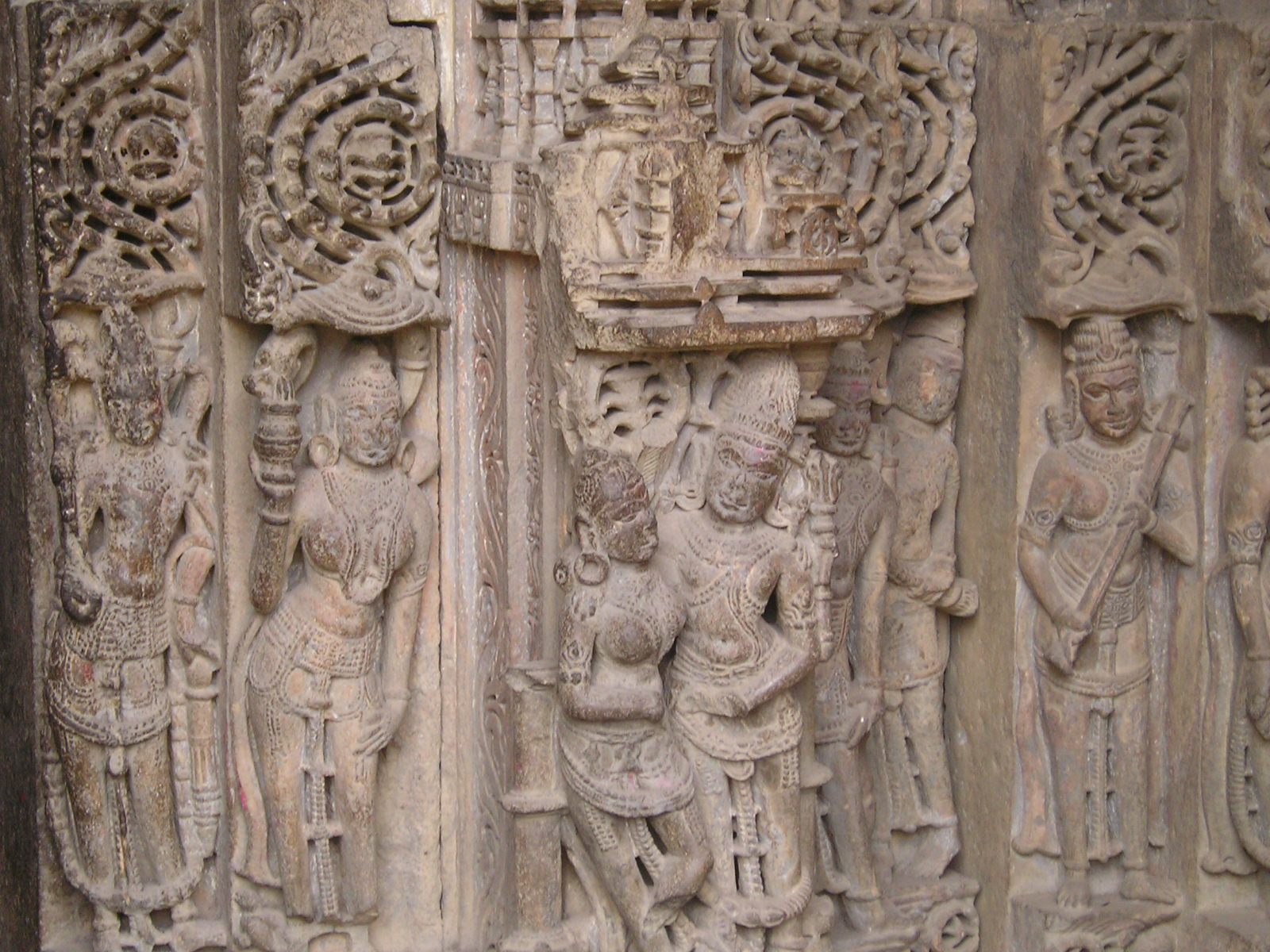
Sculpture at Omkareshwar Temple

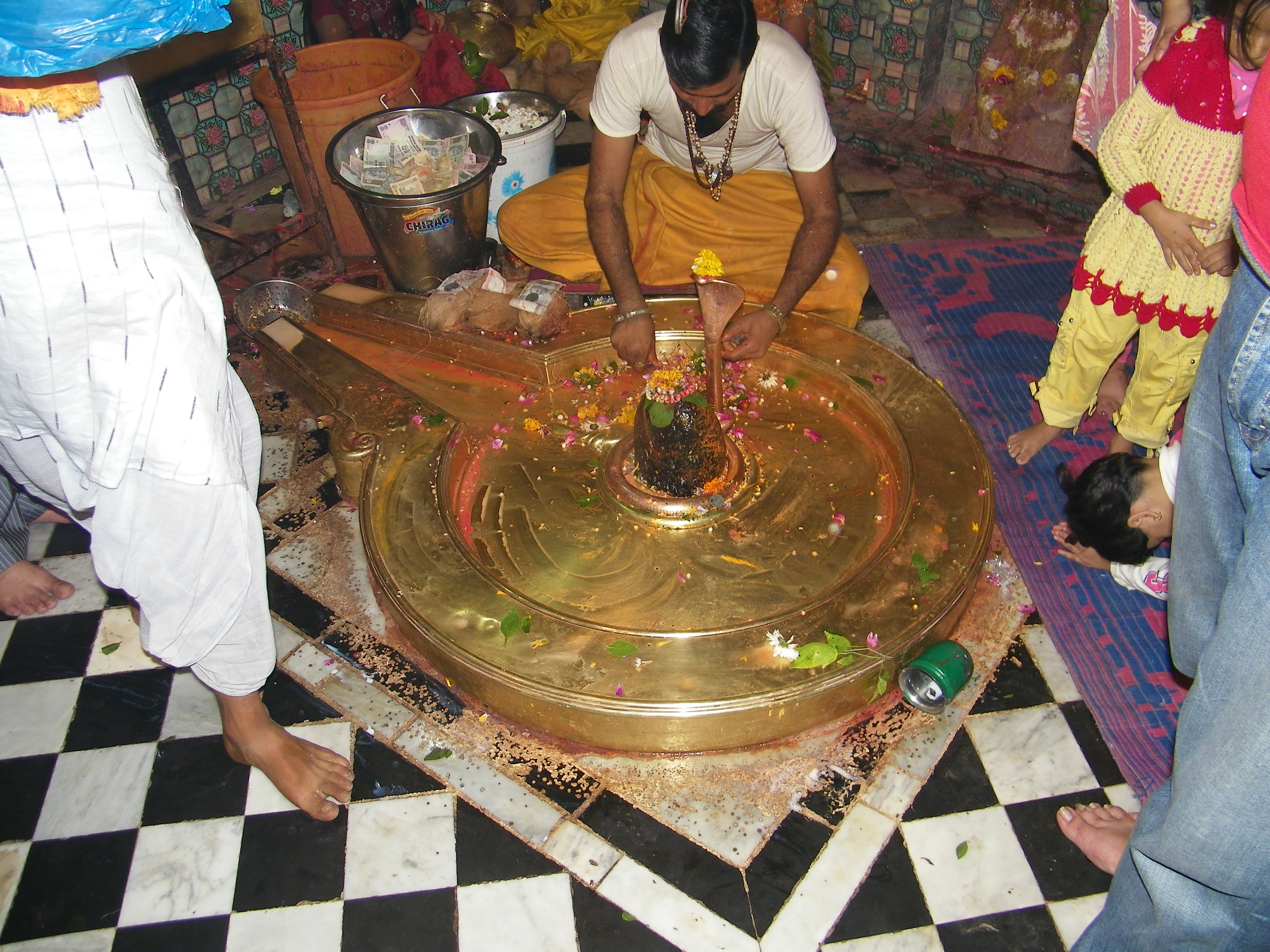
Mamleshwar Jyotirlinga

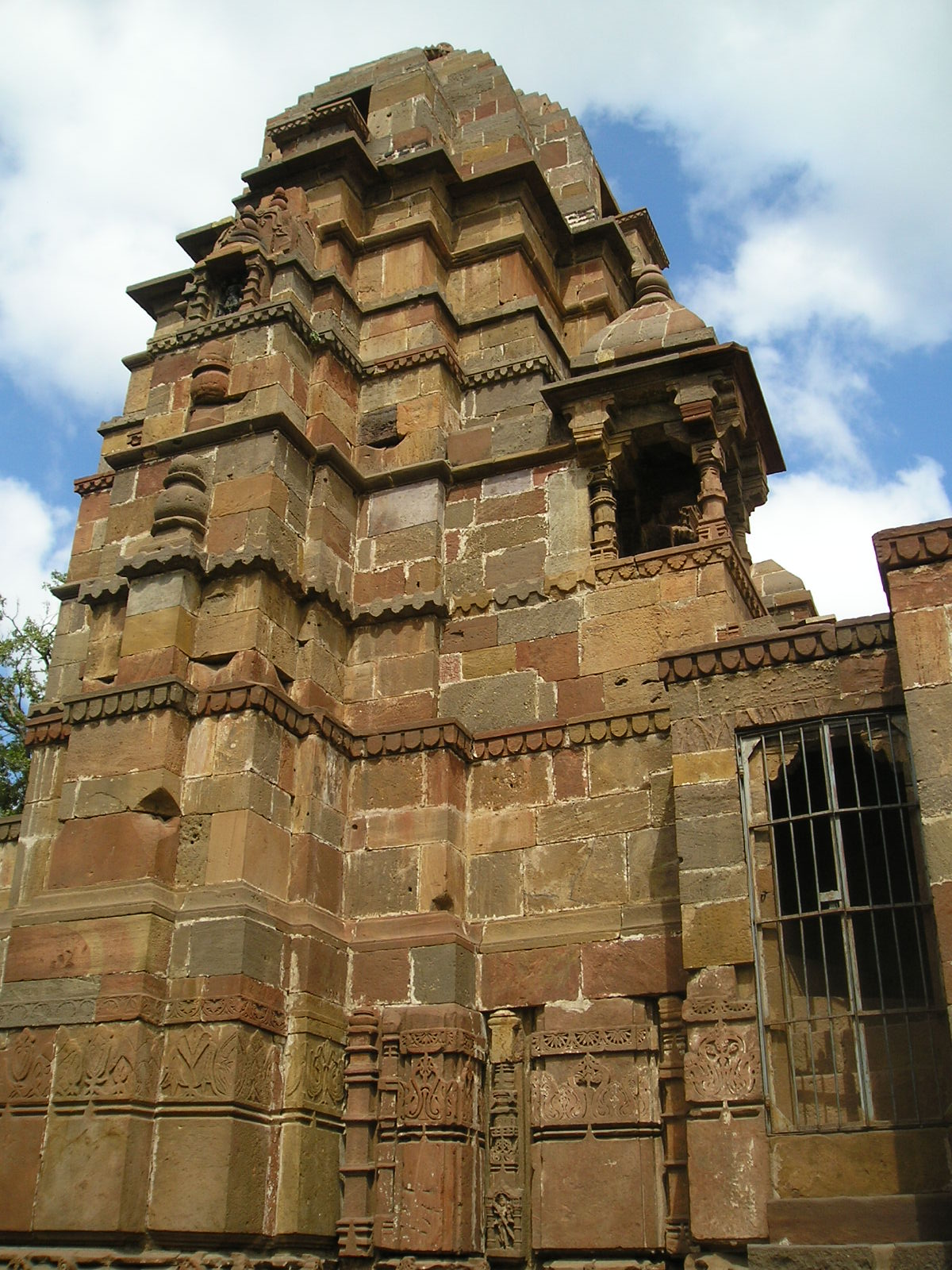
One of the temple shrines

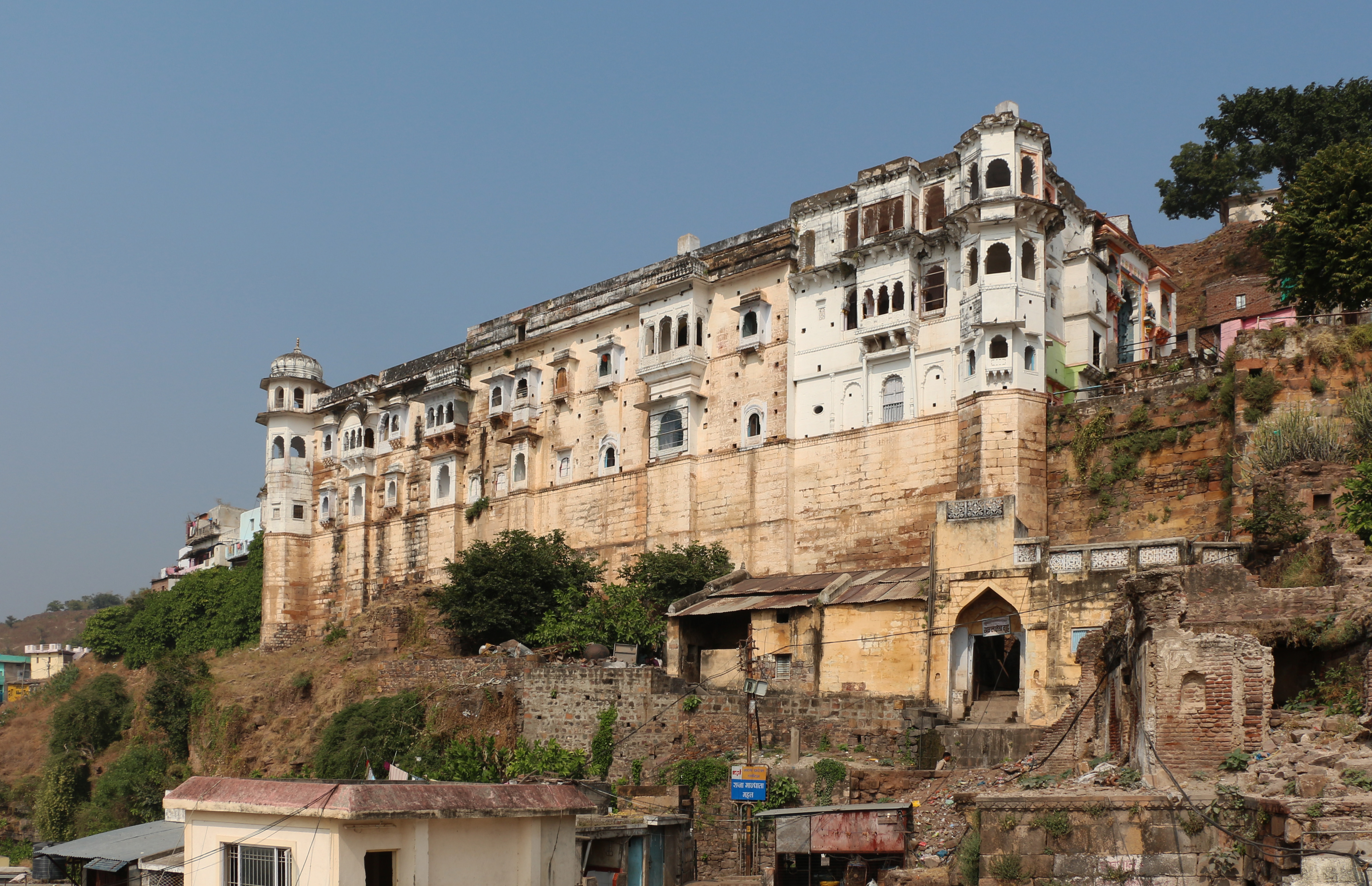
Omkareshwar Palace

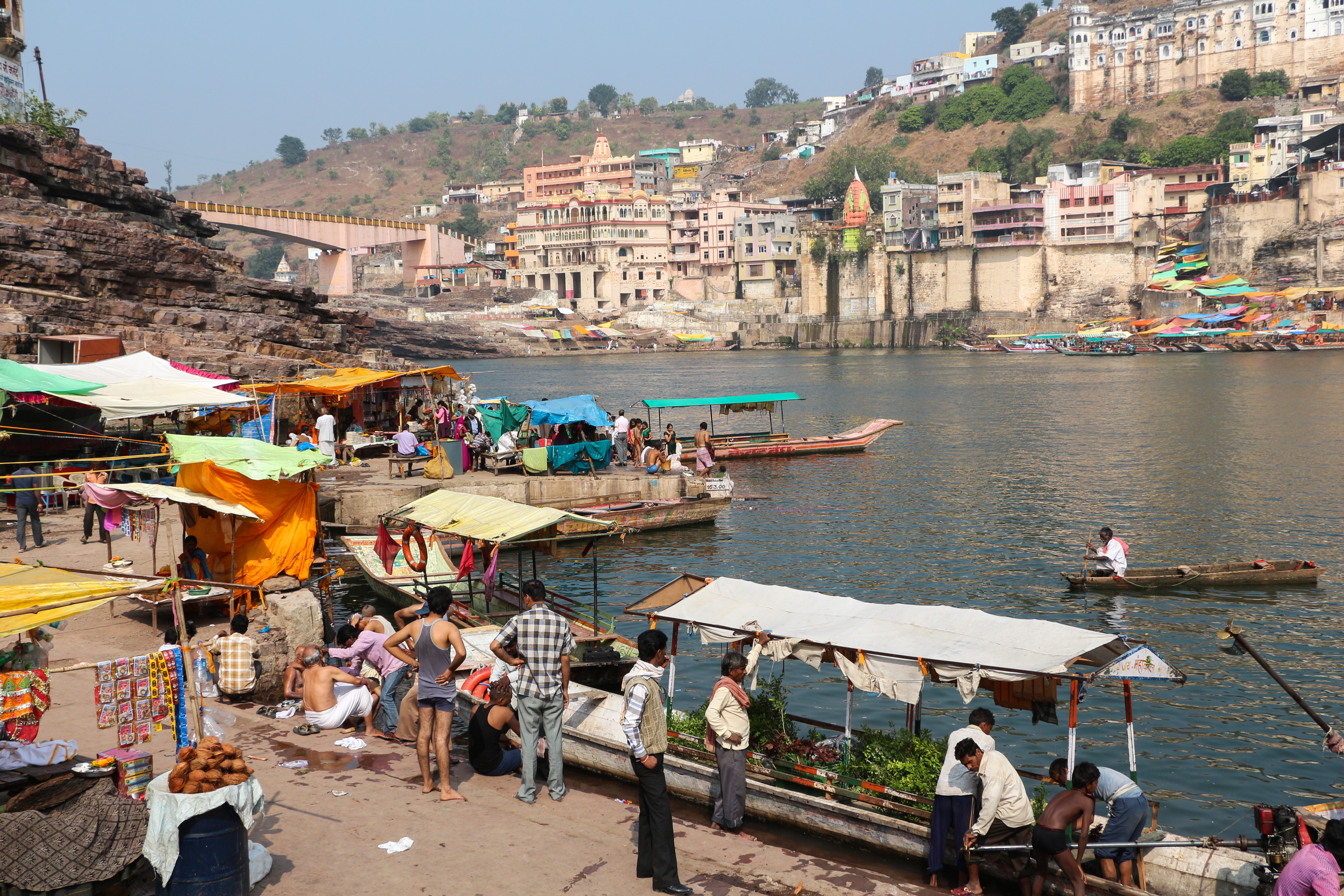
Gomukh ghat

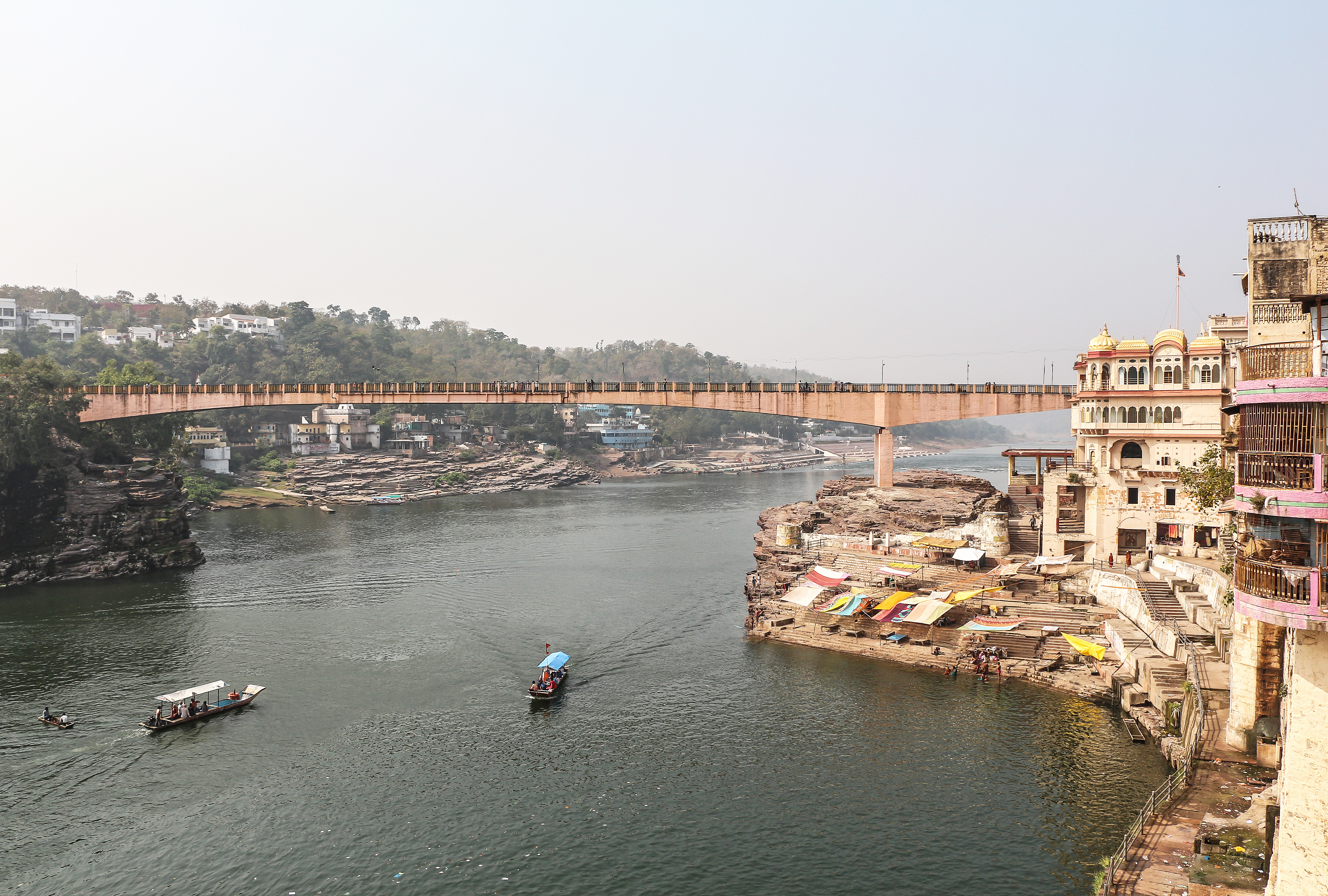
View of Narmada

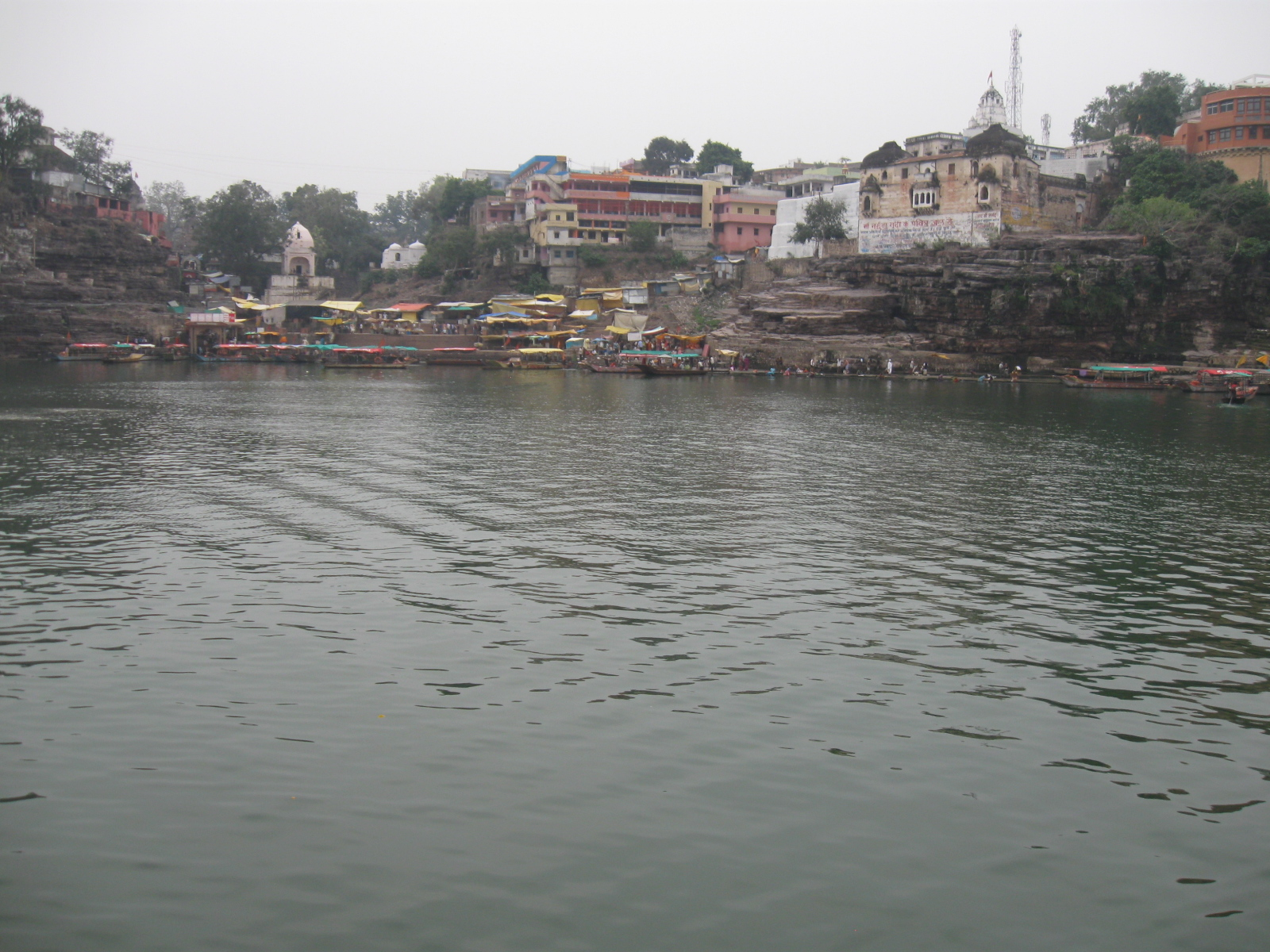
Omkareshwar temple view

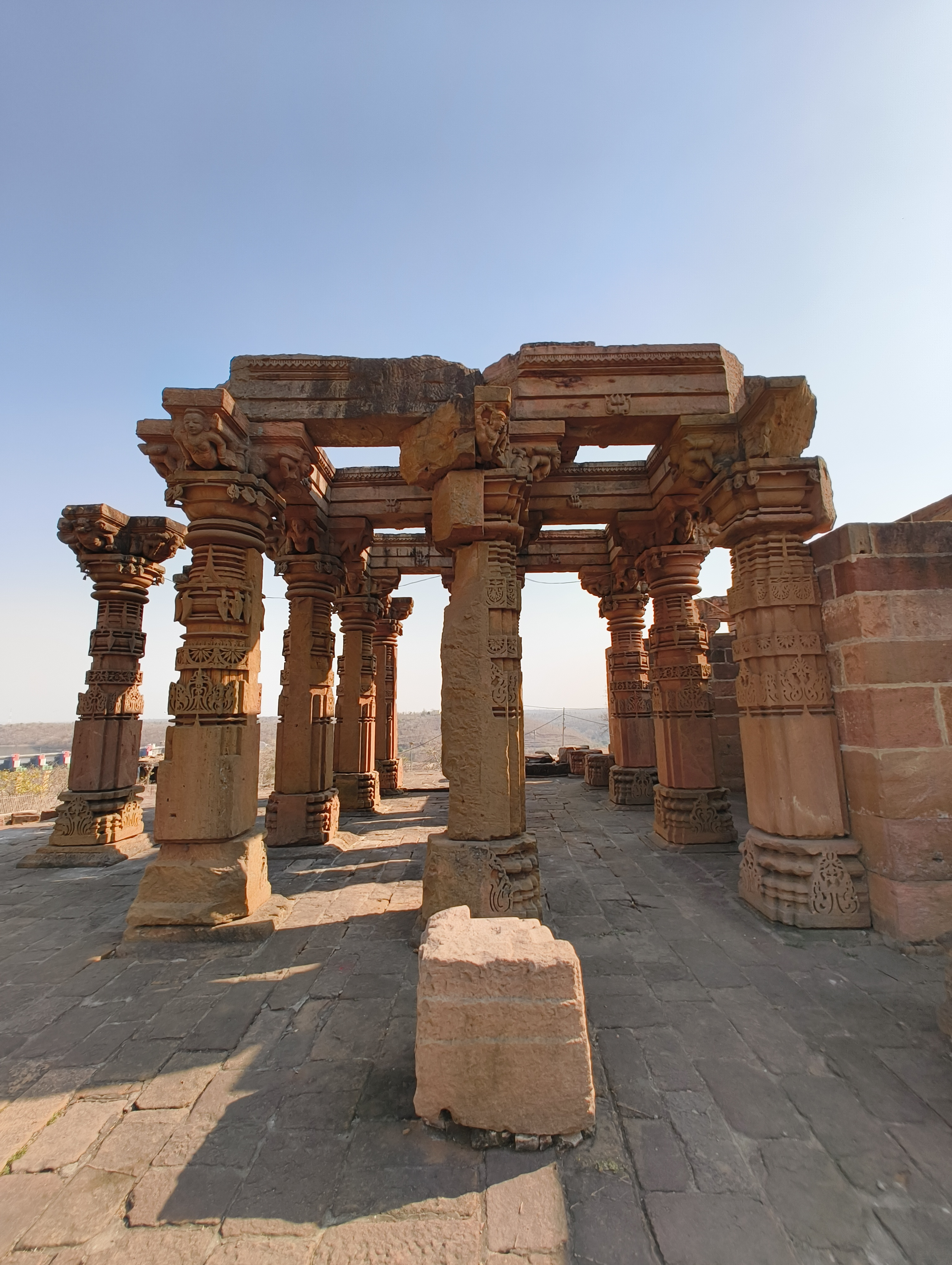
Siddhnath temple pillars

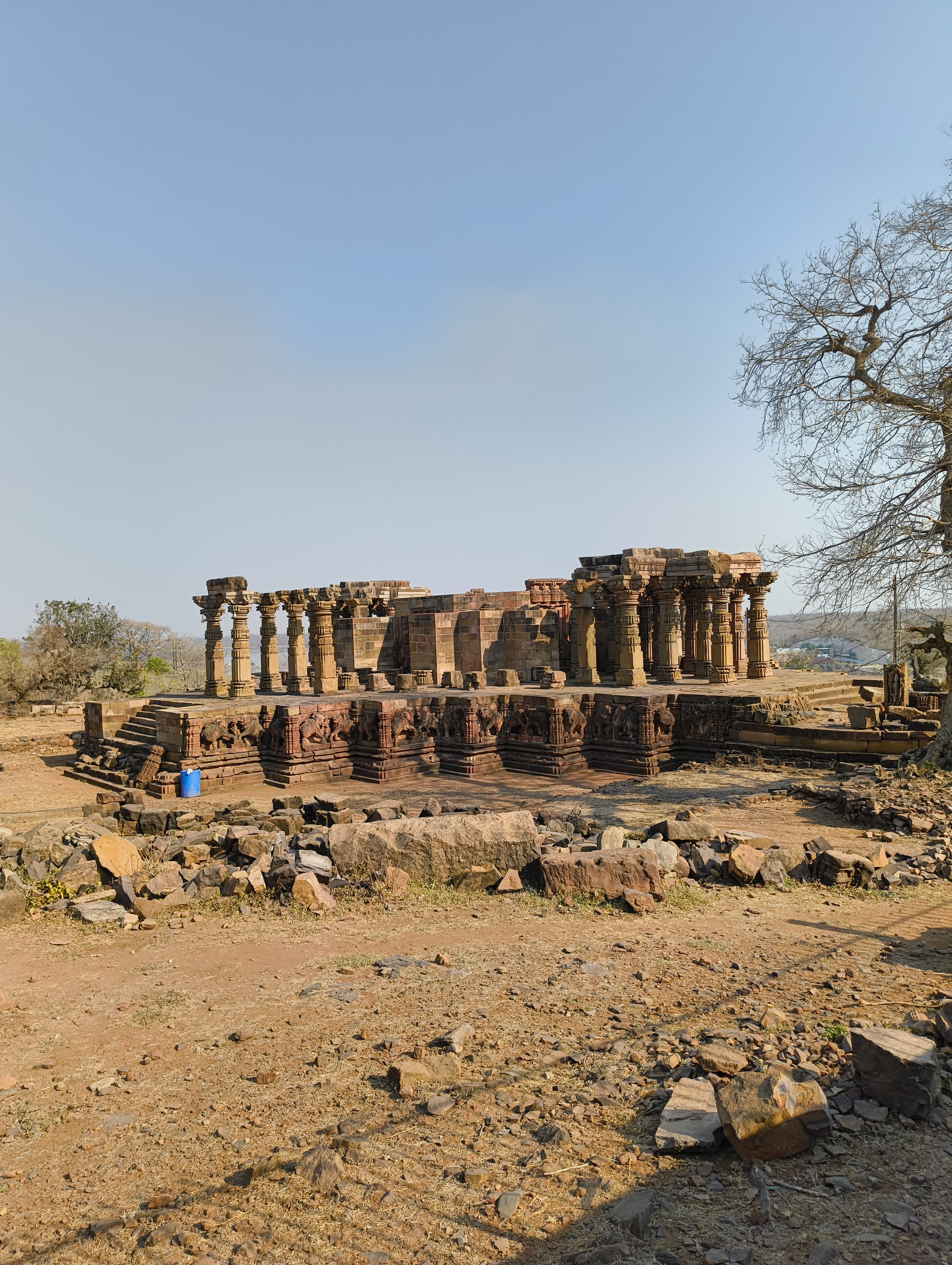
Siddhnath temple View

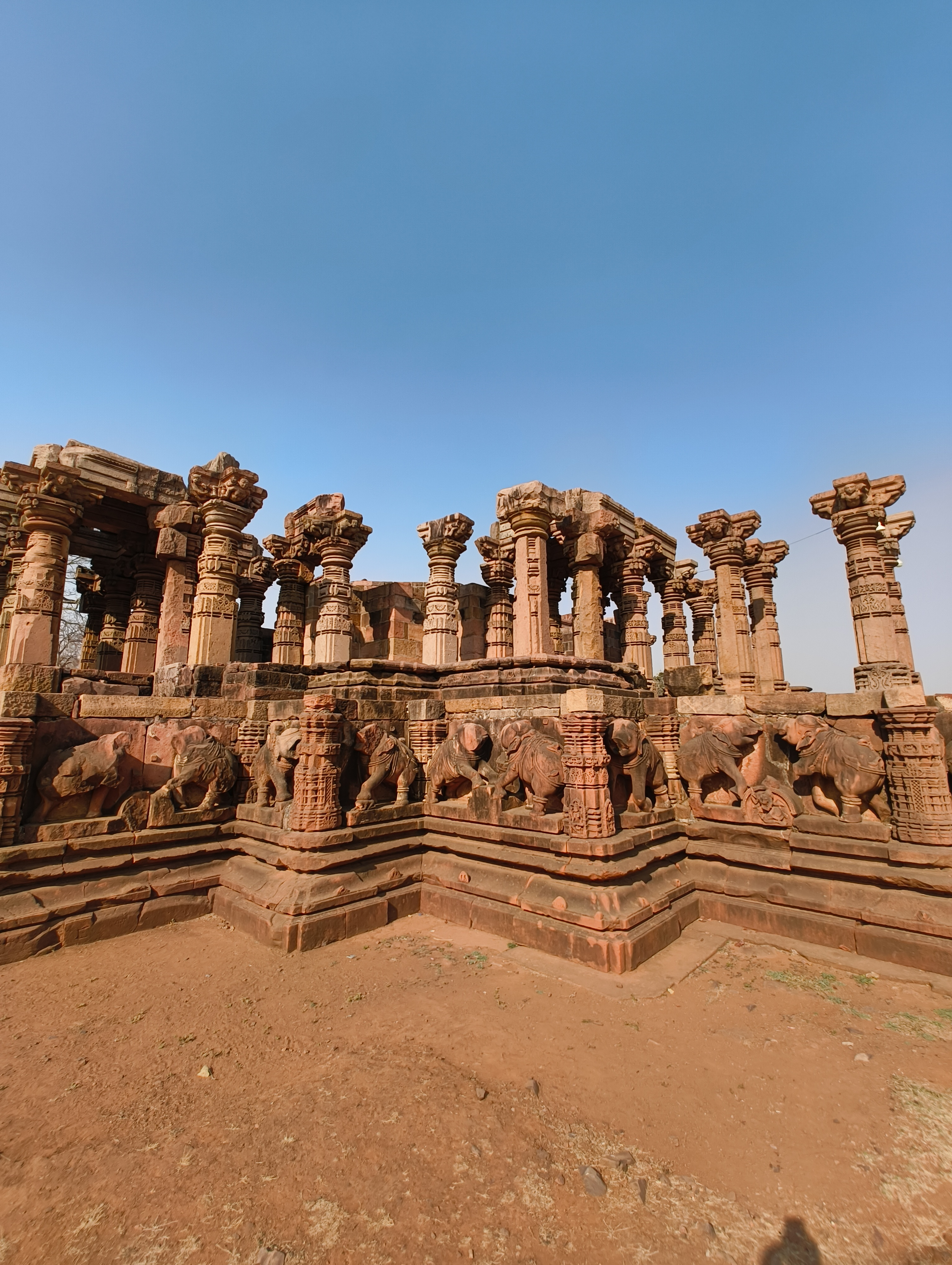
Siddhnath temple Frieze

== See also ==
- Mahakaleshwar Jyotirlinga
- Ahilya Fort at Maheshwar
- Holkar Palace
- Dhar Fort
- Mandavgad

== Notes ==
- Chaturvedi, Jyoti. (2006), Shiv Purana (First ed.), New Delhi: Diamond Pocket Books (P) Ltd, ISBN 81-7182-721-7
- Eck, Diana L. (1999), Banaras, city of light (First ed.), New York: Columbia University Press, ISBN 0-231-11447-8
- Gwynne, Paul (2009), World Religions in Practice: A Comparative Introduction, Oxford: Blackwell Publication, ISBN 978-1-4051-6702-4.
- Harding, Elizabeth U. (1998). "God, the Father". Kali: The Black Goddess of Dakshineswar. Motilal Banarsidass. pp. 156–157. ISBN 978-81-208-1450-9.
- Lochtefeld, James G. (2002), The Illustrated Encyclopedia of Hinduism: A-M, Rosen Publishing Group, p. 122, ISBN 0-8239-3179-X
- R., Venugopalam (2003), Meditation: Any Time Any Where (First ed.), Delhi: B. Jain Publishers (P) Ltd., ISBN 81-8056-373-1
- Vivekananda, Swami. "The Paris Congress of the History of Religions". The Complete Works of Swami Vivekananda. Vol. 4.
