= Jyotirlinga =

Devotional representation of the Hindu deity Shiva

Location of the Jyotirlings.
1 Somnath
2 Mallikarjuna
3 Mahakaleshwar
4 Omkareshwar
5 Baidyanath
6 Bhimashankar
7 Rameswaram
8 Nageshvara
9 Vishwanath
10 Trimbakeshwar
11 Kedarnath
12 Grishneshwar

A jyotirlinga (transl. lingam of light) or jyotirlingam is a devotional representation of the Hindu god Shiva. The word is a Sanskrit compound of jyotis ('radiance') and lingam ('sign'). The Shiva Purana mentions 64 jyotirlinga shrines in India.

== Hinduism ==
=== Legend ===
According to a legend from the Shiva Purana, once, Brahma (the god of creation) and Vishnu (the god of preservation) had an argument over their supremacy. To settle the debate, Shiva pierced the three worlds, appearing as a huge, infinite pillar of light, the jyotirlinga. Brahma and Vishnu decided to ascend and descend across a pillar of light respectively, to find the end of the light in either direction. According to some iterations, Vishnu assumed his Varaha avatar to achieve this task, while Brahma rode a hamsa (swan). Brahma lied that he had discovered the end of the light, producing a ketakī flower as proof, while Vishnu admitted that he could not find the end of the light from his journey. The dishonesty of Brahma angered Shiva, causing him to curse the creator deity that he would not be worshipped; he also declared that Vishnu would be eternally worshipped for his honesty. The jyotirlinga shrines are regarded to be the temples where Shiva appeared as a fiery column of light.

=== Original 64 ===
Originally, there were believed to have been 64 jyotirlingas of which 12 are considered to be very auspicious and holy. The twelve jyotirlinga sites take the names of their respective presiding deity, and each is considered a different manifestation of Shiva. At all these sites, the primary image is lingam, representing the beginningless and endless stambha (pillar), symbolising the infinite nature of Shiva.

=== Sanskrit shlokas ===
The following shloka (द्वादश ज्योतिर्लिंग स्तोत्रम् Dvādaśa Jyotirliṅga Stotram) describes the 12 jyotirlingas:

| Sanskrit | IAST | English |
|---|---|---|
| सौराष्ट्रे सोमनाथं च श्रीशैले मल्लिकार्जुनम्। | Saurāṣṭre Somanāthaṃ cha Śrīśaile Mallikārjunam | Somnath in Saurashtra and Sri Mallikarjuna in Srisailam; |
| उज्जयिन्यां महाकालमोङ्कारममलेश्वरम्॥ | Ujjayinyāṃ Mahākālam Omkāram Amaleśwaram | Mahakala (Mahakaleshwara) in Ujjain, Omkareshwara in (Khandwa); |
| परल्यां वैद्यनाथं च डाकिन्यां भीमशङ्करम्। | paralyam Vaidyanāthaṃ cha Ḍākinyāṃ Bhīmaśaṅkaram | Vaidyanath Temple in Parli and Bhimashankara in Dakinya; |
| सेतुबन्धे तु रामेशं नागेशं दारुकावने॥ | Setubandhe tu Rāmeśaṃ Nāgeśaṃ Dārukāvane | Ramesam (Rameswara) in Sethubandh, (Nagesam) Nageshwar Temple in Daruka-Vana; |
| वाराणस्यां तु विश्वेशं त्र्यम्बकं गौतमीतटे। | Vārāṇasyāṃ tu Viśveśaṃ Tryambakaṃ Gautamītaṭe | Vishwesham (Vishweshwara) in Varanasi, Tryambakam (Trayambakeshwara) at bank of the river Gautami (Godavari); |
| हिमालये तु केदारं घुश्मेशं च शिवालये॥ | Himālaye tu Kedāraṃ Ghuśmeśaṃ ca Śivālaye | Kedar (Kedarnath) in the Himalayas and Ghushmesh in Shivalay, (Grishneshwar/ Ghushmeshwar) |
| एतानि ज्योतिर्लिङ्गानि सायं प्रातः पठेन्नरः। | etāni jyotirliṅgāni sāyaṃ prātaḥ paṭhennaraḥ | One who recites these jyotirlingas every evening and morning |
| सप्तजन्मकृतं पापं स्मरणेन विनश्यति॥ | saptajanmakṛtaṃ pāpaṃ smaraṇena vinaśyati | is relieved of all sins committed in past seven lives. |
| एतेषां दर्शनादेव पातकं नैव तिष्ठति। | eteṣāṃ darśanādeva pātakaṃ naiva tiṣṭhati | One who visits these, gets all his wishes fulfilled |
| कर्मक्षयो भवेत्तस्य यस्य तुष्टो महेश्वराः॥: | karmakṣayo bhavettasya yasya tuṣṭo maheśvarāḥ | and one's karma gets eliminated as Maheshvara gets satisfied to the worship. |

=== Twelve most sacred sites ===
The names and the locations of 12 jyotirlingas are mentioned in the Shiva Purana (Śatarudra Saṁhitā, Ch.42/2-4). The detailed stories are given in Kotirudra Saṁhitā, chapters 14 to 33. These temples (not in order) are:

| # | Jyotirlinga | Image | State | Location | Description |
|---|---|---|---|---|---|
| 1 | Somanātha | Somnath Temple | Gujarat | Veraval | Somnath is traditionally considered the first pilgrimage site; the dvadasha (twelve) jyotirlinga pilgrimage begins with the Somnath Temple. This temple was destroyed and rebuilt sixteen times. It is located at Prabhas Patan, Veraval, in the Saurashtra region of Gujarat. |
| 2 | Mallikārjuna | Mallikarjuna Temple | Andhra Pradesh | Srisailam | The Mallikārjuna temple, also called Śrīśaila, is located on a mountain in Nandyal District in Andhra Pradesh. It enshrines Mallikarjuna in an ancient temple rich in architecture and sculpture. |
| 3 | Mahākāleśvara | Mahakaleshwar Temple | Madhya Pradesh | Ujjain | Mahakal, Ujjain (or Avanti) in Madhya Pradesh is home to the Mahakaleshwar jyotirlinga temple. The lingam at Mahakal is believed to be svayambhu (self-born), unique among the 12 jyotirlingas. It is also the only one facing the south havinghave a Shri Rudra Yantra perched upside down at the ceiling of the garbhagriha (sanctum sanctorum). |
| 4 | Oṃkāreśvara | Omkareshwar Temple | Madhya Pradesh | Khandwa | Omkareshwar, Madhya Pradesh, located on an island in the Narmada River is home to a jyotirlinga shrine and the Mamaleshwar temple. |
| 5 | Vaidyanātha | Baidyanath Temple | Jharkhand | Deoghar | The Baidyanath Temple is located in Deoghar, in the Santhal Parganas division of the Indian state of Jharkhand. The temple complex comprises the central shrine of Baba Baidyanath along with 21 additional temples, including the Jaya Durga Shakti Pitha. |
| 6 | Bhīmaśaṅkara | Bhimashankar Temple | Maharashtra | Pune | The Bhimashankar temple is situated in the Bhimashankar village of Maharashtra, where the Bhima river originates. |
| 7 | Rāmeśvara | Ramanathaswamy Temple | Tamil Nadu | Rameswaram | Rameswaram in Tamil Nadu is home to the Ramanathaswamy Temple and is revered as the southernmost of the twelve jyotirlinga shrines of India. It enshrines the Rameśvara (God of Rama) pillar. |
| 8 | Nāgeśvara | Nageshwar Temple | Gujarat | Dwarka | According to the Shiva Purana and the Dvādaśa Jyotirliṅga Stotra, the jyotirlinga named Nāgeśa is located in Darukavana (the forest of Daruka), which is most commonly identified with the modern-day Dwarka region in Gujarat. Some traditions claim the status of the Nageshwar jyotirlinga for the temples of Aundha Naganath in Hingoli district, Maharashtra, and Jageshwar in Almora district, Uttarakhand. |
| 9 | Viśvanātha | Kashi Vishwanath Temple | Uttar Pradesh | Varanasi | The Kashi Vishwanath Temple in Varanasi, Uttar Pradesh is home to the Vishvanatha jyotirlinga and is a major Hindu pilgrimage site. The temple stands on the western bank of the river Ganges. The form of Shiva here is known by the name Vishvanatha or Vishveshvara, meaning "ruler of the universe". |
| 10 | Tryambakēśvara | Trimbakeshwar Temple | Maharashtra | Nashik | The Trimbakeshwar Temple, near Nashik in Maharashtra, is a jyotirlinga shrine associated with the origin of the Godavari River. |
| 11 | Kedāranātha | Kedarnath Temple | Uttarakhand | Kedarnath | Kedarnath in Uttarakhand is revered as the northernmost and the closest jyotirlinga to Shiva's abode of Mount Kailash. It also forms a part of the smaller Char Dham pilgrimage circuit of Hinduism. |
| 12 | Gṛṣṇeśvara | Grishneshwar Temple | Maharashtra | Chhatrapati Sambhaji Nagar | The Grishneshwar Jyotirlinga Temple is situated near Ellora village in the Chhatrapati Sambhaji Nagar District of Maharashtra. |
