= Ghrishneshwar Temple =

Shrine dedicated to Lord Shiva

Ghrishneshwar Jyotirlinga
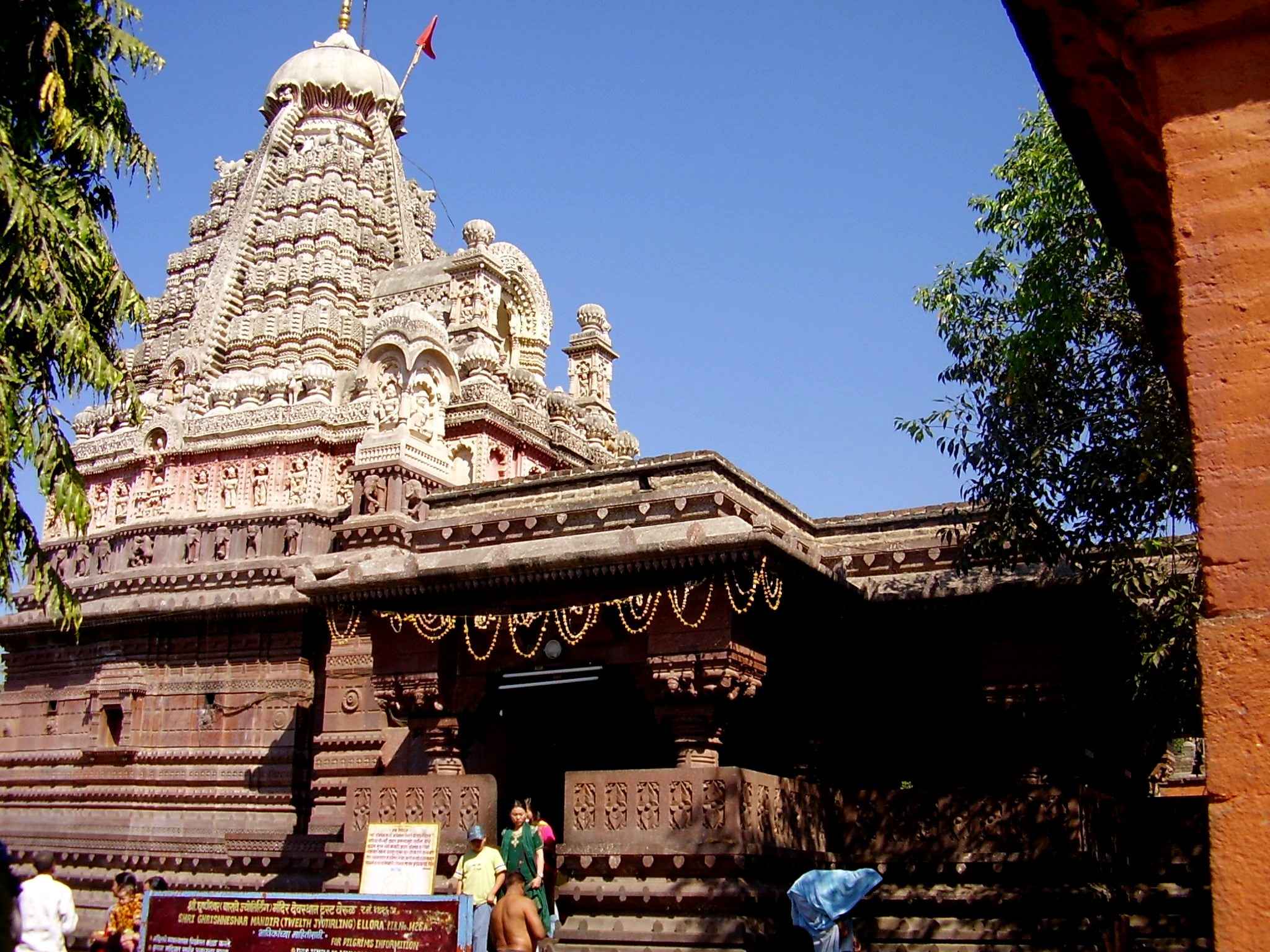

- Location in Maharashtra

Religion
- Affiliation: Hinduism
- District: Aurangabad
- Deity: Shri Ghrishneshwar (Shiva)
- Festival: Mahashivratri

Location
- Location: Verul
- State: Maharashtra
- Country: India
- Coordinates: 20°1′29.9″N 75°10′11.7″E

Architecture
- Type: Hemadpanthi

Ghrishneshwar Jyotirlinga (IAST: Ghṛṣṇeśvara), also known as Grishneswhar, is a Hindu temple of Shiva in Verul village of Aurangabad district, Maharashtra. It is one of the 12 Jyotirlinga mandirs. The mandir is a national protected site, one and a half kilometers away from the Ellora Caves, 30 kilometres (19 miles) north-west of the Aurangabad, and 300 kilometres (190 miles) east-northeast far from Mumbai. Ghrishneshwar is mentioned in the Shiva Purana, the Skanda Purana, the Ramayana and the Mahabharata.

== Etymology ==
The etymology is not sure. Several traditional accounts exist for the origin of the Sanskrit compound ghṛṣṇeśvara: The first account is a story from the Padma Purana where a devoted woman named Ghṛṣṇā asks Śiva to come and reside in this place. Thus, the name Lord of Ghṛṣṇā [ghṛṣṇeśvara]. The second story Parvati as rubbing (Sanskrit root ghṛṣ-) safron on her palms, and out of the rubbing this particular Shivlinga is produced.

A rarer alternative form of the name, Ghrneshwara means "lord of compassion".

== History ==
The temple structure was destroyed by the Delhi Sultanate in 13th and 14th centuries. The temple went through several rounds of rebuilding followed by re-destruction during the Mughal-Maratha conflict. Maloji Bhosale (grandfather of Shivaji) first restored it in the 16th century and rebuilt it to its current form in the year 1729, under the sponsorship of queen Gautama Bai Holkar of Indore, after the fall of the Mughal Empire. It is presently an important and active pilgrimage site of the Hindus and attracts long lines of devotees daily. Anyone can enter the temple premises and its inner chambers, but to enter the sanctum sanctorum (garbha-gruha) of the temple, the local Hindu tradition demands that men must go bare-chested.

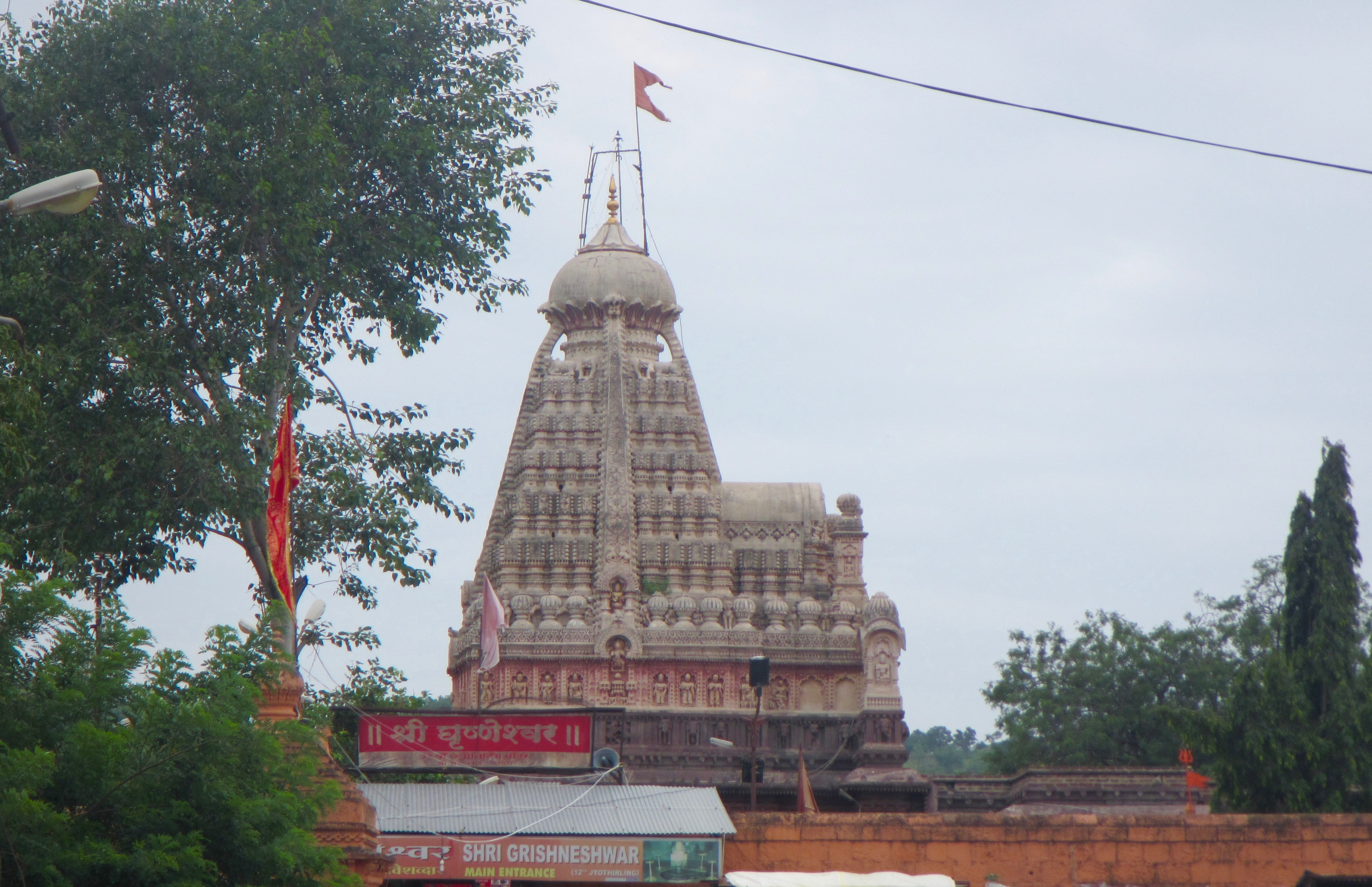
Ghrishneshwar Shiva temple

== Historical Background ==
This story about the Ghrishneshwar Jyotirlinga is described in the Puranas- in the south country, there lived a very bright ascetic Brahmin named Sudharma, near the Devgiri Mountain. His wife's name was Sudeha. Both of them had a lot of love for each other. They had no problems of any kind, but they had no children.

Astrological calculations showed that there could be no childbirth from Sudeha's womb. Sudeha was very keen to have children. She urged Sudharma to marry her younger sister.

At first, Sudharma did not want to do this but in the end, he had to bow down to his wife's insistence. He could not resist her request. He married his wife's younger sister Ghushma and brought her home. Ghushma was a very humble and virtuous woman. She was an ardent devotee of Shiva. Every day, she made one hundred and one earthly Shivalingas and worshiped them with true devotion.

Shiva caused a very beautiful and healthy child to be born from her womb a few days later. With the birth of the child, there was no end to the joy of both Sudeha and Ghushma. Their days were going by very comfortably. A while later a bad thought took birth in Sudeha's mind. She thought, "I don't have anything in this house. Everything here has been infiltrated. She also took control of my husband. The child is also hers." This evil thought slowly began to grow in her mind. Meanwhile the child of Ghushma was also growing up. Slowly, he became young. He also got married.

Finally, one day, Sudeha killed Ghushma's young son while sleeping at night. She took his body and threw it in the same pond in which Ghushma used to immerse the earthly Shivalingas every day. In the morning, everyone came to know about it. There was chaos in the whole house. Both Sudharma and his daughter-in-law beat their heads and started crying bitterly. But Ghushma remained engrossed in the worship of Shiva as usual as if nothing had happened. After finishing the puja, she set out to release the mortal Shivalingas into the pond. When she started returning from the pond, her beloved son was seen coming out from inside the pond. He fell at the feet of Ghushma.

As if he was somewhere nearby at the same time, Shiva also appeared there and asked Ghushma to ask for a boon. He was very angry with Sudeha's heinous act. He was eager to slit her throat with his trident. Ghushma folded his hands and said to Shiva- 'Prabhu! If you are happy with me, forgive that unfortunate sister of mine. She has committed a heinous sin, but by Your mercy I got my son back. Now forgive her my lord! I have one more prayer, for the welfare of the people, you should live in this place forever.'

Shiva accepted both these things. Appearing in the form of Jyotirlinga, he started living there. Due to the worship of Sati Shiva devotee Ghushma, he became known here as Ghushmeshwar Mahadev.

== Architecture ==
The Ghrishneshwar Jyotirlinga Mandir is built with black stone on an area spanning 44,000 sq ft. It has various sculptures and fine designs on its interior and exterior walls. A Jyotirlinga murti is situated in the inner sanctum or Garbhagriha of the mandir and a large murti of lord Shiva's favourite devotee and steed Nandi, is present in front of the main door.

== Other Jyotirlinga In Maharashtra ==
- Jyotirlinga
- Trimbakeshwar Temple
- Bhimashankar Temple
- Shri Vaijnath Temple
- Aundha Nagnath Temple

== Bibliography ==
- Eck, Diana L. (1999). Banaras, city of light (First ed.). New York: Columbia University Press. ISBN 0-231-11447-8.
- Gwynne, Paul (2009). World Religions in Practice: A Comparative Introduction. Oxford: Blackwell Publication. ISBN 978-1-4051-6702-4..
- Lochtefeld, James G. (2002), The Illustrated Encyclopedia of Hinduism: A-M, Rosen Publishing Group, p. 122, ISBN 0-8239-3179-X
