= Mahakaleshwar Jyotirlinga =

Hindu temple in India

Mahakaleshwar Temple Ujjain
- Mahakaleshwar Jyotirlinga
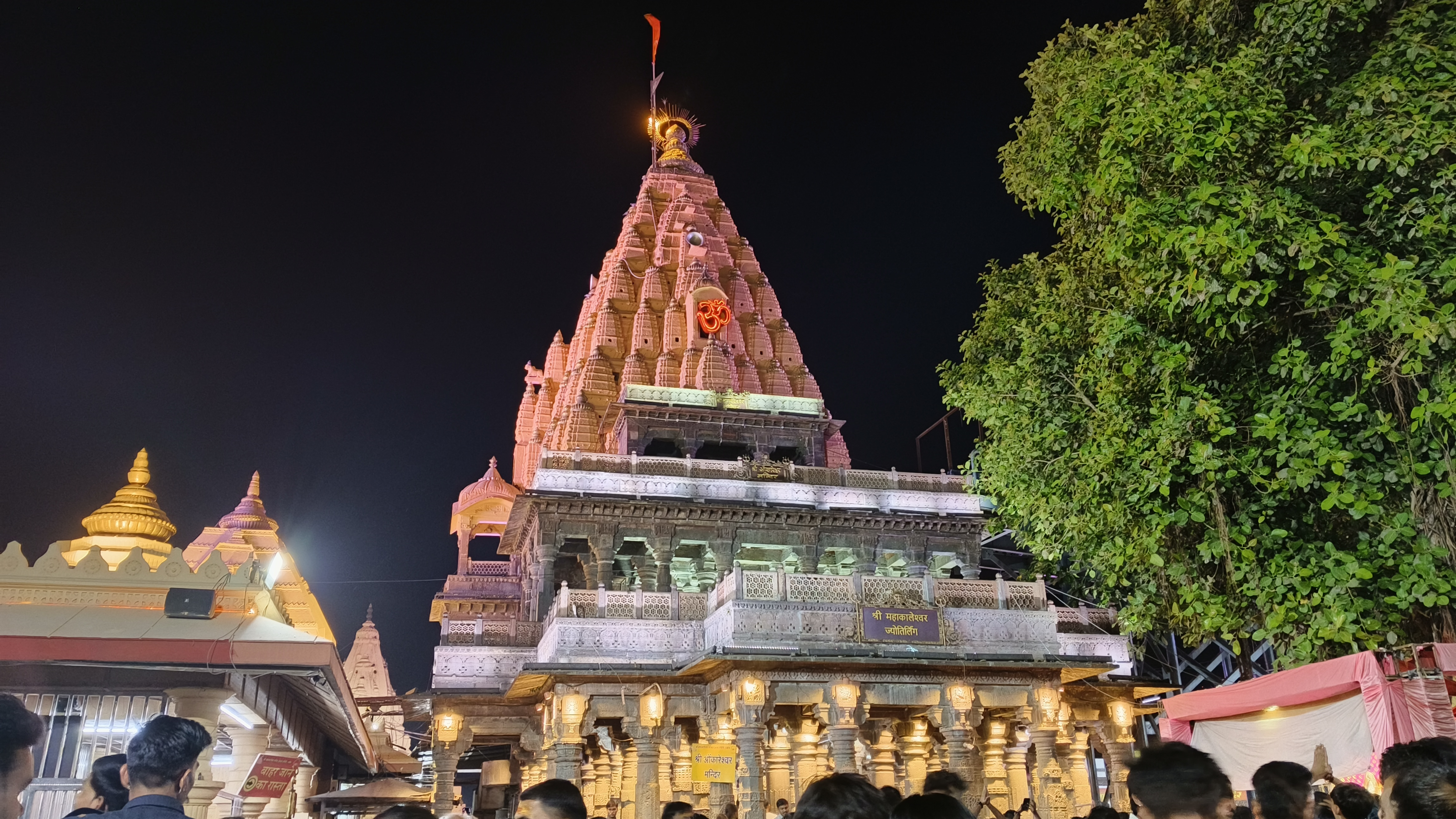

- Location in Madhya Pradesh Mahakaleshwar Jyotirlinga (India)

Religion
- Affiliation: Hinduism
- District: Ujjain
- Deity: Shiva
- Festival: Mahashivratri

Location
- Location: Ujjain
- State: Madhya Pradesh
- Country: India
- Interactive map of Mahakaleshwar Temple Ujjain
- Coordinates: 23°10′58″N 75°46′6″E

Website
- shrimahakaleshwar.com

Mahakaleshwar Jyotirlinga (IAST: mahākāleśvara) is a Hindu temple dedicated to Shiva and is one of the twelve Jyotirlingas, shrines which are said to be the most sacred abodes of Shiva. It is located in the ancient city of Ujjain in the state of Madhya Pradesh, India. The temple is situated on the side of the holy river Shipra. The presiding deity, Shiva in the lingam form is believed to be Swayambhu, deriving currents of power (Shakti) from within itself as against the other images and lingams that are ritually established and invested with mantra-shakti.

Madhya Pradesh has two Jyotirlingas, the second one, Omkareshwar Jyotirlinga, is situated about 140 km south of Mahakaleshwar Jyotirlinga.

== Temple shrines ==
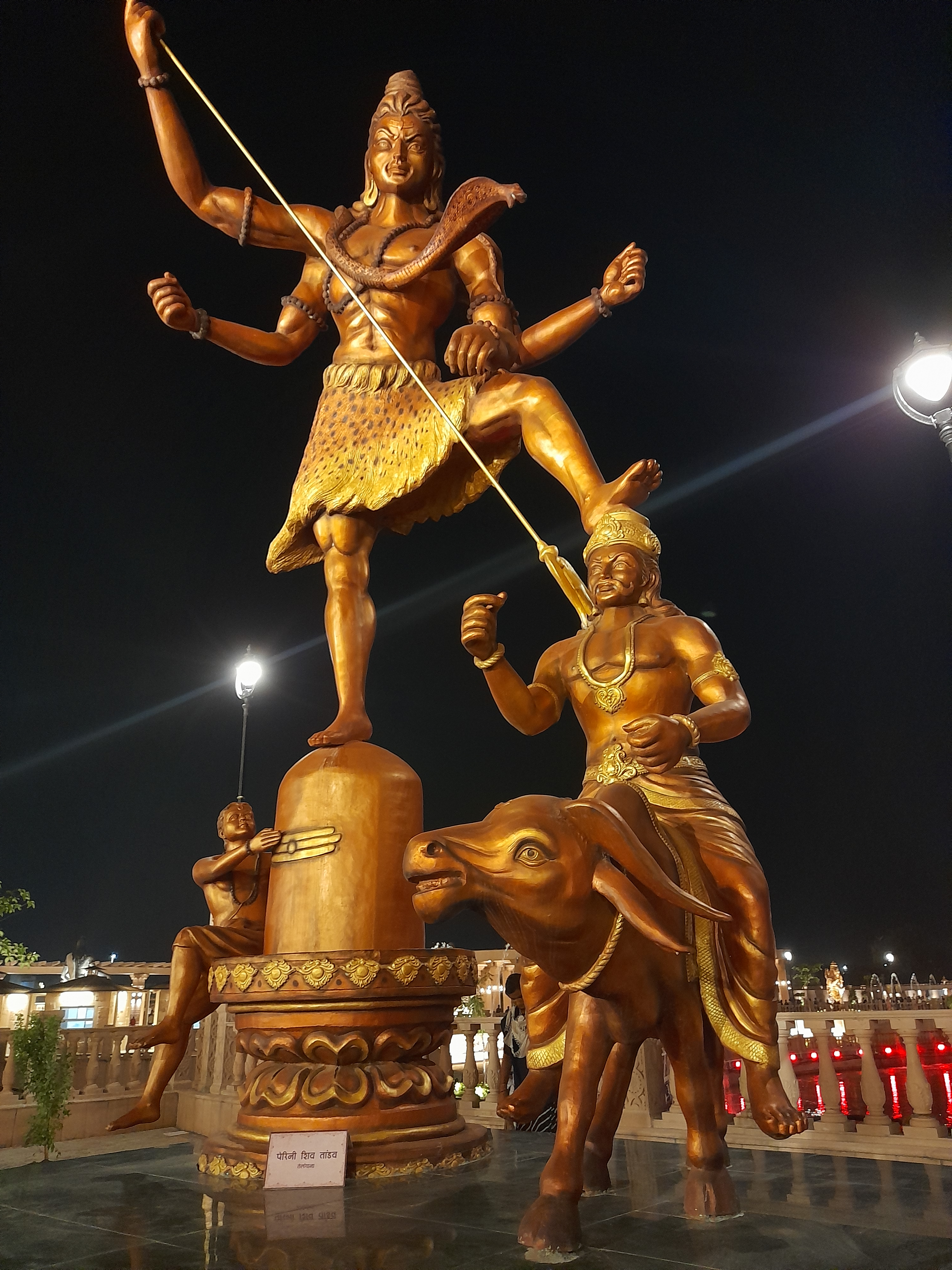
Mahakal Lok Corridor

The idol of Mahakaleshwar is Dakshinamurti, meaning it faces south. This is a unique feature, upheld by the tantric shivnetra tradition to be found only in Mahakaleshwar among the 12 Jyotirlingas. The idol of Omkareshwar Mahadevji is consecrated in the sanctum above the Mahakal shrine. The images of Ganesh, Parvati and Karttikeya are installed in the west, north, and east of the sanctum sanctorum. To the south is the image of Nandi, the vehicle of Shiva. The idol of Nagchandreshwar on the third storey is open for darshan only on the day of Nag Panchami. The temple has five levels, one of which is underground. The temple itself is located in a spacious courtyard surrounded by massive walls near a lake. The shikhar or the spire is adorned with sculptural finery. Brass lamps light the way to the underground sanctum. It is believed that prasada (holy offering) offered here to the deity can be re-offered unlike all other shrines.

The presiding deity of time, Shiva, in all his splendor, reigns eternally in the city of Ujjain. The temple of Mahakaleshwar, its shikhar soaring into the sky, an imposing façade against the skyline, evokes primordial awe and reverence with its majesty. The Mahakal dominates the life of the city and its people, even in the midst of the busy routine of modern preoccupations, and provides an unbreakable link with ancient Hindu traditions.

On the day of Maha Shivaratri, a huge fair is held near the temple, and worship goes on through the night.

The Temple has a shrine for Parvati known as avantika devi(goddess of ujjain city) behind the palki dwar at the back side of Ram Temple.

== Mahakaleshwar jyotirlinga ==
The Mahakaleshwar temple jyotirling is one of twelve total jyotirling, worshipped at twelve temples across India.

According to the Shiva Purana, Shiva once appeared as a fiery column of light, or jyotirlinga, to establish his supremacy over Brahma and Vishnu. The jyotirlinga is the supreme partless reality, out of which Shiva partly appears. It is believed that jyotirlinga shrines are places where Shiva appeared as a fiery column of light. Each of the twelve jyotirlinga sites take the name of the presiding deity - each considered different manifestation of Shiva. At all these sites, the primary image is lingam representing the beginningless and endless Stambha pillar, symbolizing the infinite nature of Shiva.

== The Mahakaleshwar Temple as a Shakta pitha ==
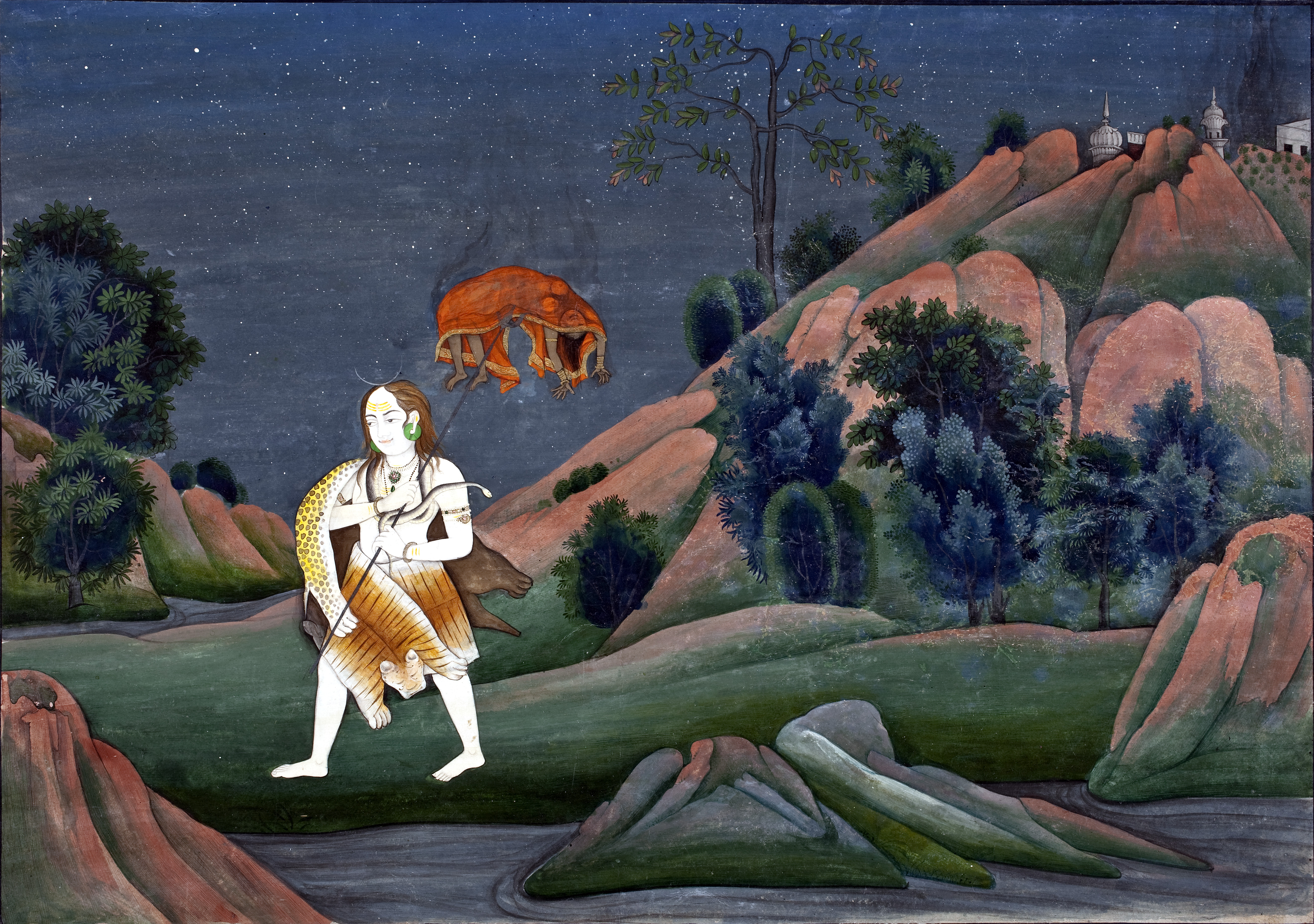
Shiva carrying the corpse of Sati Devi

The shrine is revered as one of the 18 Maha Shakta pithas.

Shakta pithas are shrines that are believed to have enshrined with the presence of Shakti due to the falling of body parts of the corpse of Sati Devi, when Shiva carried it. Each of the 51 Shakta pithas has shrines for Shakti and Kalabhairava. The Upper Lip of Sati Devi is said to have fallen here and the Shakti is called as Mahakali.

== References in Hindu scriptures ==
According to the Puranas, the city of Ujjain was called Avantika and was famous for its beauty and its status as a devotional epicenter. It was also one of the primary cities where students went to study holy scriptures. According to legend, there was a ruler of Ujjain called Chandrasena, who was a pious devotee of Shiva and worshiped him all the time. One day, a farmer's boy named Shrikhar was walking on the grounds of the palace and heard the King chanting Shiva's name and rushed to the temple to start praying with him. However, the guards removed him by force and sent him to the outskirts of the city near the river Kshipra. Rivals of Ujjain, primarily King Ripudamana and King Singhaditya of the neighboring kingdoms decided to attack the Kingdom and take over its treasures around this time. Hearing this, Shrikhar started to pray and the news spread to a priest named Vridhi. He was shocked to hear this and upon the urgent pleas of his sons, started to pray to Shiva at the river Kshipra. The Kings chose to attack and were successful; with the help of the powerful demon Dushan, who was blessed by Brahma to be invisible, they plundered the city and attacked all the devotees of Lord Shiva.

Upon hearing the pleas of His helpless devotees, Shiva appeared in his Mahakala form and destroyed the enemies of King Chandrasena. Upon the request of his devotees Shrikhar and Vridhi, Shiva agreed to reside in the city and become the chief deity of the Kingdom and take care of it against its enemies and to protect all His devotees. From that day on, Shiva resided in His light form as Mahakala in a Lingam that was formed on its own from the powers of Shiva and his consort, Parvati. Shiva also blessed his devotees and declared that people who worshipped Him in this form would be free from the fear of death and diseases. Also, they would be granted worldly treasures and be under the protection of the Shiva himself.

Bharthari was the elder son of King Gandharva-Sena, and received the kingdom of Ujjain from the celestial god Indra and the King of Dhara.

When Bharthari was king of 'Ujjayani' (modern-day Ujjain) in his state there lived a Brahman who after years of austerities was given the fruit of immortality from the celestial tree of Kalpavriksha. The Brahman presented the same to his monarch, Raja Bharthari, who in turn, passed it on to his love, the beautiful, Pinglah Rani or Ananga Sena Raja Bhartrhari's last and youngest wife. The queen, being in love with the Head police officer of the state, Mahipaala, presented the fruit to him, who further passed it on to his beloved, Lakha, one of the maids of honour. Eventually, Lakha being in love with the king presented the fruit back to the king. Having completed the circle, the fruit revealed the downsides of infidelity to the king, he summoned the queen and ordered her beheading, and ate the fruit himself. After that, he abdicated the throne, and became a religious mendicant.

He later became a disciple of Pattinatthar who first indulged in an argument about samsari and sanyasi with king Bhartrhari. Later during the conversation pattinathar said that all women have 'dual mind' and it might be the true case even with Parameswari. King conveyed this news to Rani Pingalah and she ordered Pattinathar to get punished and to sit in kalu maram (tree, whose top portion would be sharpened like a pencil and whole tree is fully coated with oil, a person who is punished to sit in the top will be split into two pieces), they tried to kill Pattinathar, but Kalu Maram started burning and nothing happened to Pattinathar, the king received the news and went directly to Pattinathar and asked him to get ready to die the next day, but Pattinathar replied, "I'm ready right now, to die". The next day king came with tears in his eyes and released saint from jail because he actually noticed Queen Pingalah in love with horsemen that night, He threw away his empire, wealth, even full coat dress and dressed in a simple kovanam (loincloth), the king became a disciple of Pattinatthar and got moksha (salvation) in the Srikalahasteeshwara Temple in Andhra Pradesh which houses the Vayu Lingam, a part of the Pancha Bhoota Sthalams of Shiva.

Kalidasa, the great Sanskrit poet of the times who was probably a contemporary of king Pushyamitra Sunga, has mentioned about the rituals of the temple in his works in Meghadūta. He mentions about the nada-aradhana, the performance of art and dance during the evening rituals.

== History ==
The temple complex was destroyed by Iltutmish during his raid of Ujjain in 1234–35. The Jyotirlinga was dismantled and believed to be thrown into a nearby 'Kotiteerth Kunda' (a pond neighbouring the temple) with the Jaladhari (a structure supporting the Lingam) stolen during the invasion. It was again attacked by Jalaluddin Khalji and Alauddin Khalji. It was later reconstructed and revived during the Maratha rule in the 18th century by Maratha Diwan Ramachandra Sukthankar.

== Mahakal Sawari Ujjain ==
Mahakal Ki Sawari is a grand religious procession of Shri Mahakaleshwar Baba, held during the Hindu months of Shravan and Bhadrapada in Ujjain, Madhya Pradesh. The procession begins with a ceremonial salute by the police to Lord Mahakal. Devotees carry the deity's idol in a decorated palanquin, singing, dancing, and seeking blessings along the way. The procession concludes with rituals at the sacred Shipra Ghat.

== Administration ==
After India became independent in 1947, the Mahakaleshwar Dev Sthan Trust was replaced by the municipal corporation of Ujjain. Nowadays it is under the collectorate office of Ujjain district.

== Connectivity ==
Nearest Airport: Indore - The journey from Indore Airport to Ujjain Mahakaleshwar Temple takes approximately 1 hour and 10 minutes, covering a distance of 58 kilometers by road.

Nearest Railway Station: Ujjain Junction - The Mahakaleshwar Temple is 2 km by road from Ujjain Railway Station.

== See also ==
- Ancient monuments in Ujjain
- Pashupathinath temple
- Omkareshwar Jyotirlinga

== Notes ==
- Dictionary of Hindu Lore and Legend, ISBN 0-500-51088-1, by Anna Dhallapiccola
- Chaturvedi, B. K. (2006), Shiv Purana (First ed.), New Delhi: Diamond Pocket Books (P) Ltd, ISBN 81-7182-721-7
- Eck, Diana L. (1999), Banaras, city of light (First ed.), New York: Columbia University Press, ISBN 0-231-11447-8
- Gwynne, Paul (2009), World Religions in Practice: A Comparative Introduction, Oxford: Blackwell Publication, ISBN 978-1-4051-6702-4.
- Harding, Elizabeth U. (1998). "God, the Father". Kali: The Black Goddess of Dakshineswar. Motilal Banarsidass. pp. 156–157. ISBN 978-81-208-1450-9.
- Lochtefeld, James G. (2002), The Illustrated Encyclopedia of Hinduism: A–M, Rosen Publishing Group, p. 122, ISBN 0-8239-3179-X
- R., Venugopalam (2003), Meditation: Any Time Any Where (First ed.), Delhi: B. Jain Publishers (P) Ltd., ISBN 81-8056-373-1
- Vivekananda, Swami. "The Paris Congress of the History of Religions". The Complete Works of Swami Vivekananda. Vol. 4.
