= Shiva Purana =

Religious text in Hinduism

The Shiva Purana (original Sanskrit title: Śivapurāṇa (शिवपुराण) and Śivamahāpurāṇa (शिवमहापुराण) is one of eighteen major texts of the Purana genre of Sanskrit texts in Hinduism, and part of the Shaivism literature corpus. It primarily revolves around the Hindu god Shiva and goddess Parvati, but references and reveres all gods.

The Shiva Purana, like other Puranas in Hindu literature, was likely a living text, which was routinely edited, recast and revised over a long period of time. The Shiva Purana asserts that it once consisted of 100,000 verses set out in twelve Samhitas (Books); however, the Purana adds that it was abridged by Sage Vyasa before being taught to Romaharshana. The surviving manuscripts exist in many different versions and content, with one major version with seven books (traced to South India), another with six books, while the third version traced to the medieval Bengal region of the Indian subcontinent with no books but two large sections called Purva-Khanda (Previous Section) and Uttara-Khanda (Later Section). The two versions that include books, differ in how they title the books. The oldest manuscript of surviving texts was likely composed, estimates Klaus Klostermaier, around 10th- to 11th-century CE. Some chapters of currently surviving Shiva Purana manuscripts were likely composed after the 14th-century.

The Shiva Purana contains chapters with Shiva-centered cosmology, and relationship between gods, ethics, yoga, tirtha (pilgrimage) sites, bhakti, rivers and geography, and other topics. The text is an important source of historic information on different types and theology behind Shaivism in early 2nd-millennium CE. The oldest surviving chapters of the Shiva Purana have significant Advaita Vedanta philosophy, which is mixed in with theistic elements of bhakti.

In the 19th and 20th century, the Vayu Purana was sometimes titled as Shiva Purana, and sometimes proposed as a part of the complete Shiva Purana. With the discovery of more manuscripts, modern scholarship considers the two texts as different, with Vayu Purana as the more older text composed sometime before the 2nd-century CE. Some scholars list it as a Mahapurana, while some state it is an Upapurana.

== Date ==
The date and authors of Shiva Purana are unknown. No authentic data is available. Scholars such as Klostermaier estimate that the oldest chapters in the surviving manuscript were likely composed around the 10- to 11th-centuries CE, which has not stood the test of carbon dating technology hence on that part we must rely on the text itself which tells when it was composed. Certain books and chapters in currently surviving Shiva Purana manuscripts were likely composed later, some after the 14th-century. The Shiva Purana, like other Puranas in Hindu literature, were routinely edited, recast and revised over the centuries.

Hazra states that the Bombay manuscript published in the 19th-century is rarer, and is likely older than other versions published from eastern and southern India.

== Different manuscripts ==
Shiva is atman (soul)

A pathologist diagnoses correctly,
and cures illness through medicines.
Similarly, Shiva is called the physician of the world,
by those who know the nature of the principles.

Shiva is the great atman,
because he is the atman of all,
he is forever endowed with the great qualities,
there is no greater atman than him.

— Shiva Puran, Kailasa Samhita, chapter 9.17-22
(abridged, translator: JL Shastri)

Several recensions of this text exist. The Bombay 1884 manuscript recension published by the Vangavasi Press, Calcutta in 1896 consists of six samhitas (sections):

#	Samhita (Section)	Adhyayas (Chapters)
I	Jnana Samhita	78
II	Vidyesvara Samhita	16
III	Kailasa Samhita	12
IV	Sanatkumara Samhita	59
V	Vayaviya Samhita: i. Purvabhaga ii. Uttarabhaga	30; 30
VI	Dharma Samhita	65
Total:		290

The second manuscript of Shiva Purana published in 1906, reprinted in 1965, by the Pandita Pustakalaya, Kashi consists of seven Samhitas:

#	Samhita (Section)	Adhyayas (Chapters)
I	Vidyesvara Samhita	25
II	Rudra Samhita: i. Srstikhanda ii. Satikhanda iii. Parvatikhanda iv. Kumarakhanda v. Yuddhakhanda	20; 43; 55; 20; 59
III	Satarudra Samhita	42
IV	Kotirudra Samhita	43
V	Uma Samhita	51
VI	Kailasa Samhita	23
VII	Vayaviya Samhita: i. Purvabhaga ii. Uttarabhaga	35; 41
Total:		457

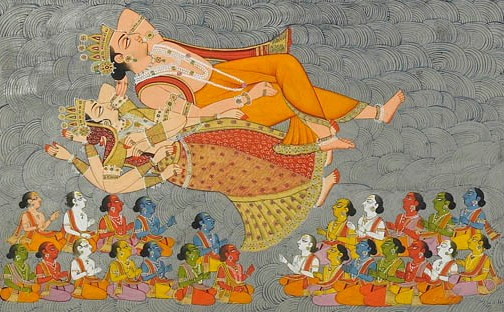
The Creation Of The Cosmic Ocean And The Elements, folio from the Shiva Purana, c. 1828.

According to a passage found in the first chapters of Vidyesvara Samhita and Vayaviya Samhita of these recensions the original Shiva Purana comprised twelve Samhitas, which included five lost Samhitas: Vainayaka Samhita, Matr Samhita (or Matrpurana Samhita), Rudraikadasa Samhita, Sahasrakotirudra Samhita and Dharma Samhita (or Dharmapurana Samhita). The number of verses in these sections were as follows:

1. Vidyeshvara Samhita - 10,000
2. Rudra Samhita - 8,000
3. Vainayaka Samhita - 8,000
4. Uma Samhita - 8,000
5. Matri Samhita - 8,000
6. Rudraikadasha Samhita - 13,000
7. Kailasa Samhita - 6,000
8. Shatarudra Samhita - 3,000
9. Sahasrakotirudra Samhita - 11,000
10. Kotirudra Samhita - 9,000
11. Vayaviya Samhita - 4,000
12. Dharma Samhita - 12,000

Several other Samhitas are also ascribed to the Siva Purana. These are the Isana Samhita, the Isvara Samhita, the Surya Samhita, the Tirthaksetramahatmya Samhita and the Manavi Samhita.

Haraprasad Shastri mentioned in the Notices of Sanskrit MSS IV, pp. 220–3, Nos, 298–299 about another manuscript of the Siva Purana, which is divided into Two Khandas (Parts), the Purvakhanda and the Uttarakhanda. The Purvakhanda consists of 3270 slokas in 51 chapters written in Nagari script and the Uttarakhanda has 45 chapters written in Oriya script. It was preserved in Mahimprakash Brahmachari Matha in Puri. The Purvakhanda of this manuscript is same as the Sanatkumara Samhita of the Vangavasi Press Edition.

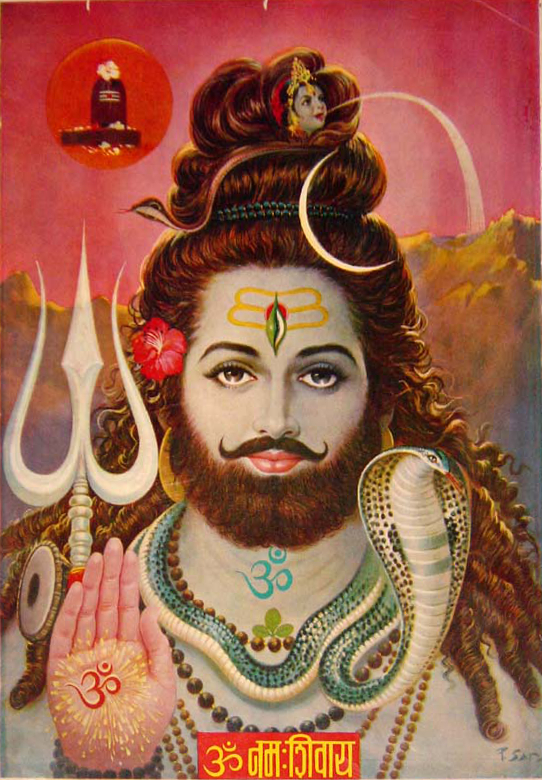
The Shiva Purana, in verses 6.23-6.30 of Vayaviya Samhita, states that Om (Pranava) expresses Shiva, it includes within it Brahma, Vishnu, Rudra and Shiva, there is Purusha in everything, nothing is smaller nor bigger than Shiva-Atman.

== Contents ==
Like the Linga Purana and other Shaivism-related Puranas, the Shiva Purana dedicates chapters to Shaiva-Advaita philosophy, advocating it as a system for moksha. The text also presents the Brahman as satcitananda theme, with masculine and feminine Shiva-Shakti as a unity, and perception of plurality-discrimination as a form of nescience. Love-Driven Devotionalism (Bhakti), asserts the text, leads to knowledge, and such love combined with knowledge leads to attracting saintly people and guru, and with them one attains liberation, states the Shiva Purana. These ideas, states Klaus Klostermaier, are similar to those found in Devi-related Puranas and Shakti Literature.

=== Vidyesvara Samhita ===
The Vidyesvara Samhita (also called Vighnesa Samhita or Vidyasara Samhita) appears in both the six and seven section versions, and is dedicated to describing the greatness and the bhakti of Shiva, particularly through the linga. This section is also notable for mentioning both Shaiva Agamas and Tantric texts, along with frequently quoting from the Vedas and asserting that the text is the essence of the Vedic teaching and Vedanta. The chapters of this section in different versions of the Shiva Purana include a description of India's geography and rivers from north and south India so often and evenly .

=== Jnana Samhita ===
The Jnanasamhita in one manuscript shares content with Rudrasamhita of the other manuscript, presents cosmology and history, and is notable for its discussion of saguna and nirguna Shiva.

The text discusses goddesses and gods, dedicates parts of chapters praising Vishnu and Brahma, as well as those related to avatars such as Krishna. It asserts that one must begin with karma-yajna, thereon step by step with tapo-yajna, then self study, then regular meditation, ultimately to jnana-yajna and yoga to achieve sayujya (intimate union) with Shiva within.

This section notes the Vedas as the highest authority, but Shiva communicated them to Vishnu.

=== Pranava ===
The Shiva Purana offers various explanations for the etymology of pranava.

1. the boat (nava) to cross samsara
2. there is no (na) diffusiveness (pra) for you (va)
3. the ideal way (pra) to overcome maya and attain new (nava) divine wisdom

== Media Adaptations ==
Adaptations include Har Har Mahadev 1950 movie, it was remade in 1974 under the same title starring Dara Singh and Jayshree Gadkar. Shiv Mahapuran 2002 Serial consisting of 61 episodes. Om Namah Shivay (1997 TV series)

== Commentaries ==
There are translations of this Sanskrit texts in English and Tamil language. One important translation in Tamil language with commentary is done by "Dravidācārya" Śrī Rāmakṛṣṇan Svāmīji of Shastra Nethralaya.. The following is a list of translations:

=== English ===
- Shiva Purana by Bibek Debroy (2023, unabridged)
- The Shiva Purana by J.L. Shastri (unabridged, Motilal Banarsidass Publishers)
- Shiv MahaPurana by shanti Lal Nagar (unabridged, Parimal publications)
