= Varkheda, Dindori =

Village in Maharashtra

Coordinates: 20°14′32″N 73°53′34″E

Varkheda is the village of Dindori taluka of Nashik district. It is well known for Grape produce of Dindori-Grape zone. It is 35 km away from Nashik city. The Unanda river is towards the south of village and is a seasonal river on the path of Ozarkhed dam. The schools in the village are Zillha Parishad Primary School and NDMVP Samaj's Secondary School. There is a government primary health centre. The Kadawa Sahakari Sakhar Karkhana sugar factory is 4 km away from the village and most of employees are serving factory from Varkheda. Varkheda is also the hub of market for more than 10 nearby villages. It has a population of 72,000 (2001).
