= List of renamed places in India =

Since India gained independence from the United Kingdom in 1947, names of many cities, streets, places, and buildings throughout the Republic of India have been systematically changed or reinstated, often to better approximate their native endonymic pronunciation. Certain traditional names that have not been changed, however, continue to be popular, and former official names remain publicly used.

== States or provinces ==
- United Provinces to Uttar Pradesh (change effective from 24 January 1950)
- Central Provinces and Berar to Madhya Pradesh (change effective from 26 January 1950)
- East Punjab to Punjab (change effective from 26 January 1950; state later trifurcated into modern-day Haryana, Himachal Pradesh and Punjab under the Punjab Reorganisation Act, 1966; Chandigarh became a Union territory and the shared capital city of Punjab and Haryana)
- Andhra State, the Telugu-speaking part of Madras Presidency, attained statehood on 1 October 1953. Three years later, Hyderabad State was annexed and combined with Andhra State and it was renamed Andhra Pradesh on 1 November 1956. The state was bifurcated in 2014 into Telangana and Andhra Pradesh.
- Travancore–Cochin to Kerala (change effective from 1 November 1956)
- Bombay State to Maharashtra (change effective from 1 May 1960; state bifurcated into modern-day Maharashtra and Gujarat)
- Madras State to Tamil Nadu (change effective from 14 January 1969)
- Mysore State to Karnataka (change effective from 1 November 1973)
- Uttaranchal to Uttarakhand (change effective from 1 January 2007)
- Orissa to Odisha (change effective from 23 September 2011)
- Kerala to Keralam (change effective from 25 August 2026)

== Union territories ==
- Laccadive, Minicoy and Amindivi Islands to Lakshadweep (change effective from 1 November 1973)
- Pondicherry to Puducherry (change effective from 1 October 2006)

== Cities and towns ==
=== Andaman and Nicobar Islands ===
- Port Blair to Sri Vijaya Puram

=== Andhra Pradesh ===
Former names of cities and towns in Andhra Pradesh at various times (Pre-Mauryan, Maurayan, Satavahana, Andhra Ikshvaku, Vishnukundina, Eastern Chalukya, Kakateeya, Musunuri, Pemmasani etc. rule) during the course of history. Andhra was mentioned as An-to-lo by Yuan Chang.

from	to	date	district
Achanta or Marthandapuram	-	-	-
Aki (during Vishnukundina Dynasty period)	Akividu	-	West Godavari
Avanigadda or Avanijapuram	-	-	-
Bejawada (Vijayavatika during Mahabharata times and Rajendracholapura during Telugu Chola Dynasty)	Vijayawada	-	-
Bhavapuri to Bhaava-pattana to Bhavapatta or Bhavapattu	Bapatla, known for Bhavanarayanaswami Temple	-	Bapatla
Birudankaravolu or Birudankitavolu or Birudankinavolu or Birudankitapuram or Birudankinapuram to Bighole or Biccavole	Biccavolu	-	East Godavari
Dasanapura or Darisi	-	-	-
Devapura or Devada	-	-	Vizianagaram
Dhakshatapovana or Dhakshavatika or Dhaksharamamu	Draksharamam	-	East Godavari
Dhamnakada to Dhamnakata to Dhamnakataka to Dhyanakara or Dhaanyakapura or Dhaanyakataka (Mauryan and Satavahana times) or Dhaanyakatakamu to Dhanakataka	Dharanikota	-	Palnadu
Dhandapura or Dhandaprolu or Tsandavolu to Chandavolu	Chandolu	-	Guntur
Dhanyakatakam during Satavahana dynasty to Dharanikota to Amarapura during Vishnukundina dynasty	Amaravati	-	-
Dugdhapavanapuramu or Upamanyupuramu or Kshirapuramu or Kshiraramamu or Palakota (Palathota) or Palakolanu	Palakollu	-	West Godavari
Durvasapuram or Duvva	-	-	West Godavari
Ekasilanagaramu or Vontimitta	Ontimitta, known for (Potana wrote Andhra Mahabhagavatam at Ontimitta Ramalayam)	-	Kadapa
Gadapa to Kadapa to Kurpah to Cuddapah (by British)	Kadapa	-	Kadapa
Gajaranyam (in Kritayuga) to Madhavipuri (in Tretayuga) to Swargasopanam (in Dwaparayuga) to Marikapuri (in Kaliyuga)	Markapuram	-	-
Garthapuri or Gunturu	-	-	Guntur
Gonkavaram	Gokavaram	-	East Godavari
Govatika	Govada	-	-
Gurajala	Gurazala or Jangamaheswarapuram	-	Palnadu
Helapuri (Eastern Chalukya times) or Eluru to Ellore by British	Eluru	1949	-
Juvikallu to Julakallu	Zulakallu	-	Palnadu
Kakinandiwada to Cocanada (by British)	Kakinada	-	-
Kalidindi to Madhurantakacholanalluru (Telugu Choda times)	Kalidindi	-	Krishna
Kanakagiri	Kanigiri (previously in Nellore District)	-	Prakasam
Kandanavrolu to Kandenavolu	Kurnool	-	-
Kandarapura or Kanteru	-	-	Guntur
Kandarapura or Skandapura or Tambrapasthana or Tambrapa or Tambrapura or Tamrapuram or Chembrolu (capital of Ganapathideva Gaja Sahiniraya)	Chebrolu	-	Guntur
Kantakasela or Kantikossula or Ghantasala	-	-	Krishna
Karmmarashtra (during Pallava period) for Ongole town and surroundings watered by Gundlakamma river	-	-	-
Kavali or Kanakapatnam	-	-	-
Kharamandalamu or Karimanal or Cholamandalam or Choramandalam to Choramandala (by the Portuguese) to Choromandel (by the Dutch)	Coromandal (by the British)	-	-
Kharapuri to Karyampudi (venue of the battle of Palnadu) to Karampudi or Karempudi or Caurampoody (by Europeans)	Karampudi	-	-
Kondapalli (Note: Kondapalli was the former and also the present name) to Mustafanagar (during Qutub Shahi and early Asaf Jahi times)	Kondapalli	-	-
Kondaveedu or Gopinathapuram to Murtazanagar (during Qutub Shahi and early Asaf Jahi times)	Kondaveedu	-	-
Krövachuru	Krosuru	-	Palnadu
Kundinapuram (near Kondaveedu)	Ameenabad	-	Guntur
Madhavipattana or Gurindalastha to Gurijala or Gurajala	Gurazala (during British era)	-	-
Mahadevicherla (cheruvu) or Mahadevitataka to Madevicherla	Macherla	-	Palnadu
Mahendragiri or Pistapura or Pittapore	Pithapuram	-	East Godavari
Matsyapuri (Mauryan and Satavahana times) or Masolia (as known by Greek and Roman historians) or Chepalarevu (locally) or Machilipatnam or Masulipatam (by British, Dutch) or Bandar (by Qutub Shahis and Asaf Jahis)	Bandaru or Machilipatnam	-	-
Nelliooru or Nellipuram or Dhaanyapuram or Vikrama Simhapuri to Nelluru	Nellore by British	-	-
Neminadhunuru	Nedunuru (Amalapuram Taluk)	-	West Godavri
Niravadyapuramu or Niravadyaprolu (during Eastern Chalukya times) to Nidadavole	Nidadavolu	-	-
Nrusimhapuri to Narasimhapuramu to Narasapur	Narasapuramu	-	West Godavari
Ongole district	Prakasam district	-	Prakasam
Pallavanadu or Palanadu or Pallenadu	Palnadu	-	Guntur
Pattiseema or Pattisam	-	-	-
Pedavegi or Vengipuram	-	-	-
Peddapalli to Petapoly by the Dutch settlers	Pettipolee or Pettipoly by British or Nizampatnam (during Asaf Jahi era)	-	Guntur
Penuganchiprolu or Penukanchiprolu or Pennegentspoel (by Europeans)	-	-	Krishna
Prathipalapura (Pre-Mauryan era)	Bhattiprolu	-	Krishna
Prolavaram	Polavaram	-	Krishna
Prudhvipuram or Prudhilapuram or Podili	-	-	-
Puruhutikanagaram, Puruhutikapuram, Puruhutikapatnam, Peethikapuramu or Pistapura	Pithapuram	-	East Godavari
Rajamahendravaramu or Rajamahendri to Rajahmundry	Rajamahendravaram	-	-
Rajavolu	Razole (by the British) or Rajolu	-	-
Rayapudi or Rayaprolu	-	-	-
Repalle or Revupalle	-	-	-
Samarlakota	Samalkota	-	East Godavari
Skandapuri or Kandukuru	-	-	Prakasam
Srikakulamu to Chicacole or Sikkolu	Srikakulam	-	-
Sriparvata (Maurayan and Satavahana times) or Vijayapuri	Nagarujunikonda or Nagarjunakonda	-	Guntur
Tarakapuri or Tanuku	-	-	West Godavari
Teravali or Tenali	-	-	-
Tundi (during Vishnukundina Dynasty period)	Tuni	-	Kakinada
Vakadu or Vandanapuri	-	-	-
Vangaprolu or Vangavolu to Vangolu to Ongolu	Ongole by British	-	Prakasam
Vardhamanapuramu to Vardhamanu	Vaddamanu	-	Guntur
Veligandla or Maarganaarayanapuramu	Veligandla (previously in Nellore District)	-	Prakasam
Vengi or Pedavegi	-	-	West Godavari
Vengipuram or Vengiparru or Vangaparru	-	-	-
Vidarbhapuri or Gudiwada	-	-	Krishna
Vijayavatika (Mahabharata times) to Rajendracholapuram (Telugu Choda times) to Bejjamwada to Bezawada by British	Vijayawada	-	-
Vishnukundinapuramu (Vishnukundina times)	Vinukonda	-	Palnadu
Waltair to Vizagapatam	Visakhapatnam	-	-

=== Assam ===
from	to	date
Gauhati	Guwahati	-
Karimganj	Sribhumi	21 November 2024
Nowgong	Nagaon	-
Sibsagar	Sivasagar	-

=== Chhattisgarh ===
from	to	date
New Raipur	Atal Nagar	2018

=== Gujarat ===
from	to	date
Broach	Bharuch	-
Bulsar	Valsad	-
Cambay	Khambhat	-
Kutchhpura	Kutch	-
Suryapur	Surat	-
Viravati to Chandravati to Vadpatra to Baroda	Vadodara	1974

=== Haryana ===
from	to	date
Amin	Abhimanyupur	2020
Ballabgarh	Balramgarh	-
Chamar Khera	Sundar Khera	-
Gurgaon	Gurugram	2016
Khizrabad	Pratap Nagar	-
Kinnar	Gaibi Nagar	-
Mustafabad	Saraswati Nagar	2016

=== Himachal Pradesh ===
from	to	date
Mandav Nagar	Mandi	-
Simla	Shimla	-

=== Goa ===
from	to	date
Curchorem	Kudchade	-
Panjim	Panaji	-
Sanquelim	Sankhali	-

=== Karnataka ===
from	to	date
Bangalore	Bengaluru	1 November 2014
Belgaum	Belagavi	1 November 2014
Bellary	Ballari	1 November 2014
Bijapur	Vijayapura	1 November 2014
Chikmagalur	Chikkamagaluru	1 November 2014
Dharwar	Dharwad	-
Gulbarga	Kalaburgi	1 November 2014
Hospet	Hosapete	1 November 2014
Hubli	Hubballi	1 November 2014
Mangalore	Mangaluru	1 November 2014
Marcera	Madikeri	-
Mysore	Mysuru	1 November 2014
Shimoga	Shivamogga	1 November 2014
Tumkur	Tumakuru	1 November 2014

=== Kerala ===
from	to	date
Alleppey	Alappuzha	-
Alwaye	Aluva	-
Badagara	Vatakara	-
Calicut	Kozhikode	-
Cannanore	Kannur	-
Casrod	Kasaragod	-
Changanacherry	Changanassery	-
Cherpalchery	Cherpulassery	-
Chirayinkil	Chirayinkeezhu	-
Cochin	Kochi	1996
Cranganore	Kodungallur	-
Devi Colam	Devikulam	-
Koney	Konni	-
Mannantoddy	Mananthavady	-
Mannarghat	Mannarkad	-
Nethirimangalam	Pattambi	-
Palai	Pala	-
Palghat	Palakkad	-
Parur	Paravur	-
Quilandy	Koyilandy	-
Quilon	Kollam	-
Sherthalai	Cherthala	-
Sultan's Battery	Sultan Bathery	-
Tellicherry	Thalassery	-
Thamaracherry	Thamarassery	-
Trichur	Thrissur	-
Trivandrum	Thiruvananthapuram	-
Verapoly	Varapuzha	-

=== Madhya Pradesh ===
from	to	date
Avantika	Ujjain	-
Bellasgate	Bheraghat	-
Bhelsa	Vidisha	-
Bhopal Bairagarh	Sant Hirda Ram Nagar, Bhopal	-
Hoshangabad	Narmadapuram	-
Indur	Indore	-
Jubbulpore	Jabalpur	-
Mandu	Mandavgarh	-
Mhow	Dr. Ambedkar Nagar	-
Rassen	Raisen	-
Saugor	Sagar	-
Ujjaini	Ujjain	-
Viratnagari	Shahdol	-

=== Maharashtra ===
from	to	date
Ahmednagar	Ahilyanagar	-
Ambarapur	Ausa	-
Bhir	Beed	-
Bombay	Mumbai	1995
Campoolie	Khopoli	-
Chanda	Chandrapur	-
Daulatabad Fort	Devagiri Fort	-
Edlabad	Muktainagar	-
Ellichpur	Achalpur	-
Islampur	Ishwarpur	-
Khadki to Aurangabad	Chhatrapati Sambhaji Nagar	-
Mominabad	Ambajogai	-
Nagpore	Nagpur	-
Nasik	Nashik	-
New Bombay	Navi Mumbai	-
Oomrawutty	Amravati	-
Osmanabad	Dharashiv	-
Poona	Pune	1978
Ratnapur	Latur	-
Thana	Thane	-

=== Mizoram ===
- Saiha to Siaha

=== Nagaland ===
- Chumukedima to Chümoukedima

=== Odisha ===
from	to	date
Angul	Anugola	12 June 2026
Asika	Asika	12 June 2026
Athagarh	Athagada	12 June 2026
Aul	Aali	12 June 2026
Balasore	Baleshwar	12 June 2026
Banpur	Banapur	12 June 2026
Baramba	Badamba	12 June 2026
Bargarh	Baragada	12 June 2026
Berhampur	Brahmapur	12 June 2026
Bolangir	Balangir	12 June 2026
Bolagarh	Bolagada	12 June 2026
Boudhgarh	Boudhagada	12 June 2026
Cuttack	Kataka	12 June 2026
Deogarh	Debagada	12 June 2026
Jatni	Jatani	12 June 2026
Jeypore	Jayapur	12 June 2026
Junagarh	Junagada	12 June 2026
Keonjhar	Kendujhar	12 June 2026
Khondmal	Kandhamal	12 June 2026
Khurda	Khordha	12 June 2026
Malkangiri	Malkangiri	12 June 2026
Nayagarh	Nayagada	12 June 2026
Nilgiri	Nilagiri	12 June 2026
Pallahara	Palalahada	12 June 2026
Podia	Padia	12 June 2026
Reamal	Riamal	12 June 2026
Redhakhol	Redhakhol	12 June 2026
Salipur	Salepur	12 June 2026
Sonepur	Sonpur	12 June 2026
Soro	Sora	12 June 2026
Sundargarh	Sundaragada	12 June 2026
Talcher	Talacher	12 June 2026
Wheeler Island	Abdul Kalam Island	4 September 2015

=== Puducherry ===
from	to	date
Pondicherry	Puducherry	1 October 2006
Yanaon	Yanam	1954 (merger with Indian Union)

=== Punjab ===
from	to	date
Jullunder	Jalandhar	-
Mohali	Sahibzada Ajit Singh Nagar	-
Nawanshahr	Shaheed Bhagat Singh Nagar	-
Ropar	Rupnagar	-

=== Rajasthan ===
from	to	date
Ajaymeru	Ajmer	-
Dhedhi Dhani	Mansanagar (District Sikar)	27 April 2011
Jessulmere	Jaisalmer	-
Jeypore	Jaipur	-

=== Tamil Nadu ===
from	to	date
Aliyabad	Kalambur	-
Arcot	Aarkadu	-
Arni	Aarani	-
Cape Comorin	Kanyakumari	-
Conjeevaram	Kanchipuram	-
Coombaconum	Kumbakonam	-
Dindigul	Thindukkal	-
Idaippadi	Edappadi	-
Karuvur	Karur	-
Kombammeddu	Koyambedu	-
Madras	Chennai	1996
Madura	Madurai	-
Mayavaram	Mayiladuthurai	-
Negapatnam	Nagapattinam	-
Ooty	Udagamandalam	-
Porto Novo	Parangipettai	-
Ramnad	Ramanathapuram	-
Srirangam	Thiruvarangam	-
Talaivasal	Thalaivasal	-
Tanjore	Thanjavur	-
Thillai	Chidambaram	-
Thirumaraikkadu	Vedaranyam	-
Tinnevelly	Tirunelveli	-
Tranquebar	Tharangambadi	-
Trichinopoly	Tiruchirapalli	-
Trinomalee	Tiruvannamalai	-
Triplicane	Thriuvallikeni	-
Tuticorin	Thoothukudi	-
Virudupatti	Virudhunagar	-
Wandiwash	Vandavasi	-

=== Telangana ===
from	to	date
Adlapur	Adilabad	-
Bhagyanagar	Hyderabad	-
Bhuvanagiri	Bhongir	-
Elagandla	Karimnagar	-
Indur	Nizamabad	-
Khambammettu	Khammam	-
Orugallu to Warangal	Ekasilanagaram (not to be confused with old Ekasilanagaram of Vontimitta) or Warangal	-
Rukmampet or Palamoor	Mahabubnagar	-
Siddapur or Metukuseema or Gulshanabad	Medak	-

=== Uttar Pradesh ===
from	to	date
Allahabad	Prayagraj	-
Banaras	Varanasi	-
Cawnpore	Kanpur	-
Faizabad district	Ayodhya district	-
Firozabad	Chandra Nagar	-
Jalalabad	Parashurampuri	-
Mughalsarai	Pandit Deen Dayal Upadhyaya Nagar	-
Mustafabad	Rampur	-

=== West Bengal ===
from	to	date
Barahanagore	Baranagar	-
Burdwan	Bardhaman	-
Calcutta	Kolkata	2001
Chandernagore	Chandannagar	-
Chinsurah	Chuchura	-
Contai	Kanthi	-
Ishapore	Ichapur	-
Krishnagar	Krishnanagar	-
Midnapore	Medinipur	-
Tamralipta	Tamluk	-

== See also ==
- Renaming of cities in India
