= Waghad Dam =

- Location within Maharashtra
- Official name: Waghad Dam D02970
- Location: Dindori
- Coordinates: 20.222053°N 73.7165882°E
- Opening date: 1979
- Owners: Government of Maharashtra, India

Dam and spillways
- Type of dam: Earthfill
- Impounds: Kolwan river
- Height: 45.6 m (150 ft)
- Length: 952 m (3,123 ft)
- Dam volume: 1,783 km^{3} (428 cu mi)

Reservoir
- Total capacity: 70,000 km^{3} (17,000 cu mi)
- Surface area: 526 km^{2} (203 sq mi)

Waghad Dam, is an earthfill dam on Kalwan river near Dindori, Nashik district in the state of Maharashtra in India.

== Specifications ==
The height of the dam above its lowest foundation is 45.6 m (150 ft) while the length is 952 m (3,123 ft). The volume content is 1,783 km^{3} (428 cu mi) and gross storage capacity is 76,480.00 km^{3} (18,348.53 cu mi).

== Purpose ==
- Irrigation

== See also ==
- Dams in Maharashtra
- List of reservoirs and dams in India
