= Materewadi, Dindori =

Village in Maharashtra

Materewadi is a village in India in Maharashtra state, Nashik district and in Dindori taluka.
