= Palkhed Dam =

- Location within Maharashtra
- Official name: Palkhed Dam D02975
- Location: Dindori
- Coordinates: 20.1911225°N 73.8834431°E
- Opening date: 1975
- Owners: Government of Maharashtra, India

Dam and spillways
- Type of dam: Earthfill
- Impounds: Kadva River
- Height: 34.75 m (114.0 ft)
- Length: 4,110 m (13,480 ft)
- Dam volume: 1,228 km^{3} (295 cu mi)

Reservoir
- Total capacity: 212,400 km^{3} (51,000 cu mi)
- Surface area: 5,760 km^{2} (2,220 sq mi)

Palkhed Dam, is an earthfill dam on Kadwa river near Dindori, Nashik district in the state of Maharashtra in India.

== Specifications ==
The height of the dam above lowest foundation is 34.75 m (114.0 ft) while the length is 4,110 m (13,480 ft). The volume content is 1,228 km^{3} (295 cu mi) and gross storage capacity is 230,100.00 km^{3} (55,203.93 cu mi).

== Purpose ==
- Irrigation

== See also ==
- Dams in Maharashtra
- List of reservoirs and dams in India
