= Ozarkhed Dam =

- Location within Maharashtra
- Official name: Ozarkhed Dam D02973
- Location: Ozarkhed, Vani
- Coordinates: 20.280031°N 73.87589°E
- Opening date: 1982
- Owners: Government of Maharashtra, India

Dam and spillways
- Type of dam: Earthfill
- Impounds: Unanda River
- Height: 35.3 m (116 ft)
- Length: 3,266 m (10,715 ft)
- Dam volume: 2,052 km^{3} (492 cu mi)
- Spillway type: Overflow

Reservoir
- Total capacity: 60,320 km^{3} (14,470 cu mi)
- Surface area: 6,880 km^{2} (2,660 sq mi)

Ozarkhed Dam is an earthfill dam on Unanda River near Dindori, Nashik district in the state of Maharashtra in India. It was constructed in Krishnagaon village which was later moved near Vani. The dam has a canal from which the water is released for irrigational purposes for the east region of Nashik district.

== Specifications ==
The height of the dam above lowest foundation is 35.3 m (116 ft) while the length is 3,266 m (10,715 ft). The volume content is 2,052 km^{3} (492 cu mi) and gross storage capacity is 67,950.00 km^{3} (16,302.07 cu mi).

== Purpose ==
Its water is used for various purposes for the Vani village and the other 30 villages of Chandwad taluka of Nashik district. It is also used for irrigational purposes for the nearby villages.

== See also ==
- Dams in Maharashtra
- List of reservoirs and dams in India
