= Indra Varma =

See Indira Varma for the actress of whose name this is a common misspelling

Indra Varma was an Indian monarch who is considered to be the first ruler of the Vishnukundin dynasty. He might have carved out a small principality for himself probably as a subordinate of the Vakatakas sometime about the last quarter of the 4th century CE. Not much information is known about the next two kings, Madhav Varma I and his son Govinda Varma. They might have kept intact the inheritance or extended their sway to some extent.

== See also ==
- History of India
- Deccan Plateau
