= J. D. C. Bytco =

Indian contractor, businessman and philanthropist

Jairambhai Dayabhai Chauhan Bytco
- Born: 1885; Kumbharia, Kutch, British India
- Died: 1978 (aged 92–93); Nasik, India
- Occupations: Railway and civil contractor, Industrialist, Philanthropist

Jairambhai Dayabhai Chauhan Bytco (1885–1978), better known by name J. D. C. Bytco, was a railway and civil contractor, industrialist and philanthropist based at Nasik, India.

== Life sketch ==
Jairam was born to Dayabhai Chauhan in 1885 in Kumbharia in Kutch, British India. He belonged to Mestri community of Kutch.

His father Dahya Vira Chauhan was also a railway contractor. Jayram Dahya carried on his father's legacy as a railway contractor and later became an industrialist. He founded J. D. Bytco Limited, an oral health-care and herbal product manufacturing company, that produces gripe water, tooth powder and other oral and baby care products. He ventured in the hotel industry, founded Bytco Cinema Hall and was at a time one of the top industrialists of Nasik.

He died in 1978 at Nasik.

A main square of Nashik is named Bytco Point after him.

== Charitable deeds ==
In later years of his life he gave away much of his wealth to charities. In 1971, he founded the Muktidham temple complex at Nashik Road, which has a replica of twelve Jyotirlingas, temple of Krishna and other deities within its temple complex and is one of the tourist attractions of the town. He took personal interest in building of Muktidham temple and also employed the services of the painter Raghubir Mulgaonkar for beautification of temple complex. The Muktidham complex also houses a dharamshala, which can accommodate at least 200 pilgrims. He also built a Hindu crematorium near Muktidham.

He also donated land and money to start Jairambhai High School, D. D. Bytco Higher Secondary School, Smt R. J. Chauhan High School, J. D. Bytco Commerce & Science College & J.D.C. Bytco Institute of Management & Higher Studies in Nashik. He also donated money to start Bytco hospital, which is now named Jairam Hospital & Research Center, located in Nasik Road near Muktidham temple.

Also at Kumbharia in Kutch, he built a dharamshala, donated funds to rehabilitation of their kuldevi temple and the founding of a primary and secondary school.

He founded the Jairambhai Dayabhai Chauhan (Bytco) Charitable Trust, through which he carried on his charitable activities. The trust still continues to donate monies for charitable works, scholarships and research works and is now managed by his sons.
