= Kadva River =

Kadva river

Location
- Country: India
- State: Maharashtra
- District: Nashik
- City: Niphad

Physical characteristics
- Source: Sahyadris
  - location: Dindori Taluka, Nashik District, Maharashtra
  - coordinates: 19°58′27″N 73°56′12″E
- Mouth: Godavari River
  - location: Nandur Madhyameshwar, Nashik, Maharashtra
  - coordinates: 19°10′46″N 73°02′24″E
  - elevation: 550 m (1,800 ft)
- Length: 74 km (46 mi)
- Basin size: 1,664 km^{2} (642 sq mi)

Basin features
- Tributaries
  - left: Unanda River, Vinita River
  - right: Kolwan River, Dhaman River

Kadva river is a minor but important tributary of Godavari in Nashik district, Maharashtra, India. It originates and flows through the Dindori Taluka of Nashik District.

== Origin and course ==
The Kadva rises in the Sahyadris to the north-west of Dindori Taluka in the angle between the former and the Satmala Range, and crosses Dindori from north-west to south-east. It is rocky both in bed and bank, but the bed is wide, and the average volume of water is small compared with the area through which it flows. Irrigation works of considerable importance have been established on it. At its confluence with Godavari, a pick-up weir has been constructed, raising the upstream water levels and resulting in the formation of the Nandur Madhyameshwar reservoir. The backwaters of this reservoir harbors rich flora & flora and have been deemed as the Nandur Madhyameshwar Bird Sanctuary. It witnesses migratory birds belonging to different species arriving here in huge numbers during the winter season. Total length of this river is 74 km up to Nandur Madhyameshwar Dam with a total drainage area of near about 1664 km^{2}.

== Tributaries ==
The Kadva is joined by several tributary streams mostly from the north or the left bank. The Kadva is joined on the left bank by several streams draining the southern slopes of the Satmala ranges. The chief of those joining on the right bank is the Kolwan and Dhaman

- Unanda : It is the first of these having a long course nearly parallel to the Satmalas and receives several small streams draining its slopes. Among these are the small Dev nadi flowing past Vani, on parashari river there is one minor dam which is tisgaon dam. That water is used for irrigation. The Parasheri river flowing by Pimpalgaon Basavant, its meat to kadava river near the shirasgaon village (niphad taluka), the Netravati nala flowing by Vadner, the Vainatha nadi joining it near Niphad and formed by the union of two rivers, the Vadali flowing by Vadali Bhoi and the Shelu. The Ozarkhed Dam has been built on the river Unanda.
- Kolwan : It rises in the Sahyadris to the south of that river. At Waghad it is crossed by the Waghad Dam giving rise to the Waghad tank used for irrigation.
- Dhaman : Further below it is joined by the Dhaman nadi from the south flowing past Dindori, at about two km. above its confluence with the Kadva near Rajapur.

== Dams ==
- Karanjwan Dam
- Palkhed Dam

== See also ==
- List of rivers of India
- Rivers of India
