= Gandhinagar Airport =

Airport in Maharashtra, India

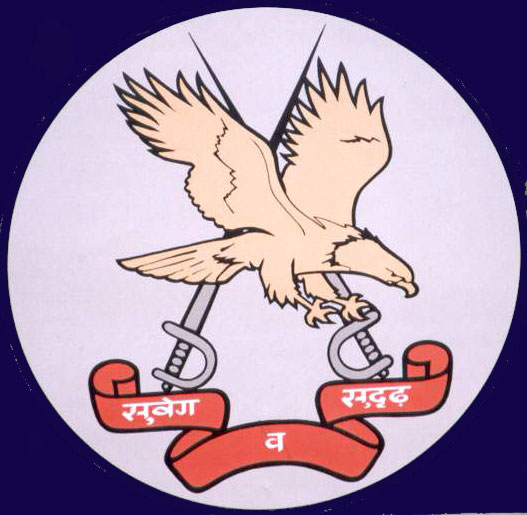
- Combat Army Aviation Training School
- IATA: ~~ISK~~; ICAO: VANR

Summary
- Airport type: Military
- Owner: Indian Army
- Operator: Indian Army Aviation Corps
- Serves: Nashik, Maharashtra, India & Nashik Road-Devlali
- Location: Nashik Road
- Elevation AMSL: 483 m / 1,585 ft
- Coordinates: 19°57′49″N 073°48′27″E

Maps
- Maharashtra in India

- Location of the airport in Maharashtra

Runways
Direction	Length		Surface
Direction	m	ft	Surface
09/27	1,378	4,521	Concrete
- Sources: WAD, GCM, STV

Gandhinagar Airport (IATA: ~~ISK~~, ICAO: VANR) was a public airport serving the city of Nashik, in the state of Maharashtra, India until it was taken over by the Indian Army to convert it into a Military Airbase.

Note: The airport code ISK is transferred to Ozar Airport. On the boarding pass, it might printed as Gandhinagar Airport ISK, but the flight is from Ozar.

== History ==
Indian Airlines used to operate a daily flight between Nashik and Mumbai from 1972 to 1989. Vayudoot then took over and operated a Dornier 228 till June 1992. For five years, there was no air service available from Nashik, till April 1997, when the Maharashtra-Span Air — a joint venture of state government and Span Aviation Ltd — inaugurated its daily service to Mumbai. It operated a 12-seater Beechcraft on the route as a part of the government's plan to connect important districts in the state by air. The service was abruptly discontinued on 30 June 1997.

The airfield is now converted into a full-fledged Army Aviation Base where training is imparted to all candidates at the Combat Army Aviation Training School (CATS) at Nashik.

The Cheetah helicopter simulator has been set up at Combat Army Aviation Training School (CATS). It is expected to reduce substantial cost in training and also to reduce pilot risk during training. The simulator is designed to expose the trainee to different weather conditions like snow, rain, storm and different terrains in addition to night flying training in handling emergencies, tactical handling of the flying machine, its different maneuvers and more. The project to install a simulator was proposed in December 2000 and approved in April 2002, with CATS Nashik chosen as the centre for installation. Macmet Technologies Ltd, which won the bid over Hindustan Aeronautics Limited (HAL), completed the project by 2005 at a cost of Rs 16.26 crore. After stringent checks, the facility was accepted by the army in December 2005.

== See also ==
- Ozar Airport
