= Karanjwan Dam =

- Location within Maharashtra
- Official name: Karanjwan Dam D02969
- Location: Dindori
- Coordinates: 20.29098°N 73.7639668°E
- Opening date: 1974
- Owners: Government of Maharashtra, India

Dam and spillways
- Type of dam: Earthfill
- Impounds: Kadva River
- Height: 39.31 m (129.0 ft)
- Length: 2,483 m (8,146 ft)
- Dam volume: 1,960 km^{3} (470 cu mi)

Reservoir
- Total capacity: 166,220 km^{3} (39,880 cu mi)
- Surface area: 18,420 km^{2} (7,110 sq mi)

Karanjwan Dam, is an earthfill dam on Kadwa river near Dindori in state of Maharashtra in India.

== Specifications ==
The height of the dam above lowest foundation is 39.31 m (129.0 ft) while the length is 2,483 m (8,146 ft). The volume content is 1,960 km^{3} (470 cu mi) and gross storage capacity is 175,580.00 km^{3} (42,123.88 cu mi).

== Purpose ==
- Irrigation
- Electricity generation

== See also ==
- Dams in Maharashtra
- List of reservoirs and dams in India
