= Vengi =

Historic region in India

Vengi or Venginadu (Telugu: వేంగి, IPA: [ʋeːŋɡi]) is a historic region located in present-day Andhra Pradesh, India spread over the Godavari and Krishna river deltas. Its capital was located at Pedavegi, near Eluru. Vengi was a prominent city in ancient and medieval Andhra for nearly seven centuries and served as the capital for several dynasties, including the Salankayanas and the Eastern Chalukyas.

== History ==
=== Mauryan and Satavahana Period ===
Vengi was part of Ashoka's Maurya Empire in the mid-3rd century BCE. Following the decline of the Mauryas, the region came under the control of the Satavahana dynasty, who ruled for nearly four centuries. The Satavahanas, established by Simuka, extended their domain to include areas as far as Magadha and Bengal at their zenith. After the fall of the Satavahanas, the region was governed by successive dynasties such as the Pallavas and Andhra Ikshvakus.

=== Salankayanas and Vishnukundinas ===
By 300 CE, the Salankayana dynasty replaced the Andhra Ikshvakus and ruled over Vengi. In the late 5th century, the Salankayanas were annexed by the Vishnukundinas, who expanded their control over the region.

=== Chalukyas of Vengi ===
In the early 7th century, King Pulakesin II of the Chalukyas of Badami conquered Vengi from the Vishnukundinas and installed his brother, Kubja Vishnuvardhana, as the ruler of the region. This marked the beginning of the Eastern Chalukya dynasty, which ruled for several centuries. The Eastern Chalukyas expanded their territory, extending their influence as far north as Srikakulam and as far south as Nellore. The dynasty frequently faced invasions from the Rashtrakutas and other neighboring powers.

=== Chola Conquest and Influence ===
In the late 10th century, the Chola dynasty under Raja Raja Chola I invaded Vengi to support Saktivarman I, an Eastern Chalukya prince, against local rivals. Saktivarman was restored to the throne in 1002 CE under the overlordship of the Cholas. Subsequent marital alliances between the Cholas and the Eastern Chalukyas solidified their relationship, allowing the Cholas to absorb Vengi into their empire during the reign of Kulothunga Chola I. Vengi remained under Chola control until the 12th century.

=== Later Dynasties ===
Following the decline of the Cholas, Vengi came under the control of the Velanati Chodas, who served as vassals to the Cholas. By the early 13th century, the region was incorporated into the Kakatiya Empire. The Reddy dynasty ruled the area from 1328 until it became part of the Vijayanagara Empire in the 15th century.

== Literature and culture ==
The Eastern Chalukyas played a role in the cultural and literary history of Andhra Pradesh. They were patrons of Telugu literature. From the time of Gunaga Vijayaditya, Telugu prose and poetry developed, culminating in major literary works. During the reign of Rajaraja Narendra, the court poet Nannaya began the Telugu translation of the Mahabharata, marking a milestone in Telugu literature.
