= Deolali =

- Town
- Location in Maharashtra, India
- Coordinates: 19.951°N 73.834°E
- Country: India
- State: Maharashtra
- District: Nashik
- Elevation: 515 m (1,690 ft)

Population (2011)
  - Total: 54,027

Languages
  - Official: Marathi
- Time zone: UTC+5:30 (IST)
- Postal code: 422401
- Vehicle registration: MH-15

Deolali, or Devlali ([d̪eːwɭaːli]), is a small hill station and a census town in Nashik district of the Indian state of Maharashtra. Now it is part of Nashik Metropolitan Region.

Deolali has an important army base. Deolali Camp, one of the oldest Indian military centres in the country, started the Air Force Station, the School of Artillery of the Indian Army, and other establishments in this region. Deolali has plenty of temples and tourist destinations.

== History ==
=== British period ===
Deolali was a British Army camp 100 miles north-east of Mumbai (then called Bombay). It was the original location of the Army Staff College (later the Defence Services Staff College of India and the Pakistan Command and Staff College).

It is also the source of the British slang noun doolally tap, loosely meaning "camp fever", and referring to the apparent madness of men waiting for ships back to Britain after finishing their tour of duty. By the 1940s this had been widely shortened to just "doolally", an adjective meaning "mad (insane)" or "eccentric".

== Demographics ==
As of 2011 Indian Census, Deolali had a total population of 54,027, of which 28,269 were males and 25,758 were females. Population within the age group of 0 to 6 years was 6,085. The total number of literates in Deolali was 43,172, which constituted 79.9% of the population with male literacy of 83.5% and female literacy of 76.0%. The effective literacy rate of 7+ population of Deolali was 90.1%, of which male literacy rate was 94.3% and female literacy rate was 85.4%. The Scheduled Castes and Scheduled Tribes population was 11,540 and 1,982 respectively. Deolali had 11696 households in 2011.

As of 2001 India census, Deolali had a population of 50,617, of which males were 27,693 (55%) of the population and females were 22,924 (45%). Population in the age group 0–6 years was 6,024. The total number of literates were 39,215, which constituted 77.5% of the total population. The effective literacy of population 7 years and above was 87.9%.

== Transportation ==
=== Railways ===
Devlali railway station is very close to the cantonment where a large number of important trains halt. Located 17 km from Nashik city, there is air connectivity as an Air Terminal has been constructed at Ozar airfield.

== Education ==
Notable educational institutes include:

- Barnes School
- Army Public School
- St Patrick’s Convent High School

== Places of interest ==
Around the town, It is also a town with various health sanatoriums and temples, including the Muktidham temple at Nashik Road. The town is also famous for Buddhist caves, popularly known as Pandavleni Caves. The golf course, inside the Deolali Cantonment, was one of the largest in India at the time of its development by the British.

The Shrine of Infant Jesus, which is a Christian pilgrim centre is located 8 km away from Deolali.

The Artillery Museum, which was established in 2000 and is open to the public.

== In popular culture ==
- The town was the setting for the first four series of the British sitcom It Ain't Half Hot Mum, set in 1945.
- Scenes from the movie "Dolly Ki Doli" was shot in the two bungalows at Saubhagyanagar, Deolali Camp.
- Deolali was home to Bollywood actor Arjun Rampal. Who finished his schooling in St Patrick high school.
