= Madhava Varma II =

Vishnukundina king from 440 to 460

- Andhradhipati, Dakshinapathadhipati, Trisamdradhipati, Paramaheswara, Janashraya

Vishnukundina king
- Reign: c. 456 – c. 495
- Predecessor: Madhava Varma I
- Successor: Vikramendra Varma II
- Spouse: Vakataka Mahadevi
- Issue: Vikramendra Varma I; Deva Varma
- Dynasty: Vishnukundina

Madhava Varma II was the ruler of the Vishnukundina dynasty from 456 to 495. He is regarded as the greatest ruler of his dynasty. The Vishnukundina Empire reached its greatest territorial extent under him. It was during this period the Vishnukundina dynasty was raised, in its own estimation, to the imperial dignity.

== Early life ==
He was the son of Govinda Varma I and his wife Mahadevi. He had two sons - Vikramendra Varma and Deva Varma.

== Reign ==
His predecessor was Madhava Varma I (c. 420 – c. 455). He is considered as the greatest ruler of the Vishnukundina dynasty. The Vishnukundina Empire reached its greatest territorial extent under him. He may have defeated the Vakataka ruler Prithvishena II and married his daughter, Vakataka Mahadevi, who was the mother of his son Vikramendra Varma I. Alternatively, she may have been the daughter or granddaughter of Harisena, married during the height of the latter's rule.

He occupied Kalinga and invaded the Pallavas of Kanchipuram in his 33rd regnal year. He wrote 'Janasraya'. he had an epithet- 'Trivara Nagara Bhavnagata Sundari Hridaya Nandana' ( The one who brought happiness to the beautiful maidens living in the buildings of the city of Trivara)

After occupying these areas from the Ananda Gotrikas, Madhava Varma II made Amarapura, modern Dharanikota, near the Amaravati Stupa) his capital. Keeping in view the constant threat from the Pallavas, he created an outpost to check their activities and appointed his son, Deva Varma and after his death the grandson Madhava Varma III as its Viceroy.

== Military strength ==
Madhava Varma II appears to have been a powerful warlord, with an army consisting of 800 elephants, 1500 cavalry horses, 23 chariots and many foot soldiers. This is mentioned in Ipur Plates of Vishnukundina dynasty.

Their army consisted of traditional fourfold divisions:

- Elephants
- Chariots
- Cavalry
- Infantry

The Hastikosa was the officer-in-charge of elephant forces and the Virakosa was the officer-in-charge of land forces. These officers issued even grants on behalf of the kings.

== Extent of the Kingdom ==
East –Bay of Bengal

West – Arabian sea

North – Reva, Narmada river.

South – Southern sea. Gundlakamma river or Pennar river

Andhra Pradesh, Telangana, Southern Madhya Pradesh Maharashtra, Southern Odisha and Northern Karnataka

In Maharashtra Satara District One of Madhava Varma II inscriptions was found in Maharashtra. Vishnukundinas coins were found in all over Maharashtra, Madhya Pradesh

== Religion ==
All the records of the Vishnukundinas and the kings prior to the Madhava Varma II seem to be patrons of Hinduism.

== Inscriptions ==
It is stated in the Tummalagudem Plates II that by his Madhava Varma II seized the royalty of the kings of other dynasties and that his authority extended over the region surrounded by the eastern southern and western seas and the river Reva (Narmada) in the north. It is also stated that his kingdom was hounded by the western sea and the river Seva in the north.

From Velpuru inscription we learn that he led his army southward across the river Krishna with a view to ecnquer the Guntur region. It speaks of his presence in military camp at Velpuru probably during the course of a war with the Pallavas,

Madhava Varma II extended his kingdom upto Narmada, exterminated the Salankayana Dynasty at Vengi, subjugated the rulers of Pishtapura and Srikakulam and thus expended his kingdom to the eastern sea. He vanquished the Pallavas and annexed northern parts of Guntur district to his Kingdom.

Khanapur plates:

Place: Satara district, Maharashtra.

The second plate mentions Maharaja Madhava Varma II who was a Sarvabhouma(emperor) and who performed the all ritual and asvamedha sacrifices. Defeated the Vakataka King Prithvishena II, and Married the Princess of Vakataka Mahadevi, He had the title of chaturvamsa, chaturasrama, dharm-karmasetu.
