= Salankayana dynasty =

Dynasty of ancient India

The Salankayana (IAST: Śālaṅkāyana) dynasty of ancient India ruled a part of Andhra region in India from 300 to 440 CE. Their territory was located between the Godavari and the Krishna rivers. Their capital was located at Vengi, modern Pedavegi near Eluru in West Godavari district of Andhra Pradesh.

== Territory ==
Find spots of Śālaṅkāyana inscriptions

The find spots of the dynasty's inscriptions suggest that it ruled in and around the doab lying between the Krishna and the Godavari rivers in Āndhra-deśa. Nine of the ten extant Śālaṅkāyana inscriptions were issued from Vengi-pura (modern Pedavegi or Peddavegi). The only exception is the Penugonda inscription, which was issued from Vijaya-jayapura, possibly a place of pilgrimage.

The find spots of the eight of the inscriptions are known: Kanteru (2), Kanukollu (2), Penugonda, Guntupalli, Pedavegi, and Kolleur lake. Another inscription records the grant of the Elūra village, which can be identified with modern Eluru. Yet another inscription records the grant of the Dhārikāṭūra village, whose identity remains unknown.

== Political history ==
The Ikṣvāku dynasty, whose last extant inscription is from c. 325 CE, ruled the Krishna-Godavari region in the early 4th century. Their successors, whose rule possibly overlapped with them, included the Śālaṅkāyanas (c. 300-450), the Br̥hatphalāyanas (c. 300-350), and the Ānanda-gotra kings (c. 300–400).

The early Pallavas (c. 300-550), who ruled the area to the south of the Krishna River, show multiple similarities with the Śālaṅkāyanas, leading to speculation that the two dynasties may have been related to each other. For example, the seals of both the dynasties featured a bull, both had kings named Skanda-varman and Nandi-varman, both were associated with the Bharadvaja gotra (clan), and the inscriptions of both the dynasties show a language shift from Middle Indo-Aryan to Sanskrit. According to Sanskrit lexicons, the word "śālaṅkāyana" is an alternative name for Nandin, which suggests that the bull icon was connected to the dynasty's name.

Eight of the ten extant dynasty's inscriptions use the name of its gotra as an epithet for the king, describing the king as simply "Śālaṅkāyana". They mention the royal titles cittarathasāmi-pādānujjhāta, bappa-bhaṭṭāraka-pāda-bhatta. The Penugonda inscription mentions a king named Hatthi-vamma (Sanskrit "Hasti-varman"). This inscription does not mention the word Śālaṅkāyana, but epigraphist D.C. Sircar has identified it as a Śālaṅkāyana inscription.

According to the Allahabad Pillar inscription of Samudragupta, he captured and released several kings of Dakshiṇāpatha, including Hasti-varman of Vengi; this suggests that the Śālaṅkāyana king may have become a tributary to the Gupta king.

The Viṣṇukuṇḍins (c. 422-612) appear to have displaced the Śālaṅkāyanas around the mid-5th century. In the late 5th century, the Salankayanas were conquered by Madhava Varma II of the Vishnukundinas.

== Inscriptions ==
As of 2025, ten Śālaṅkāyana inscriptions have been discovered. Nine of these are copper-plate inscriptions which record land grants to Brahmins (brahmadeya) or to the god of a temple (deva-dāna). The only stone inscription, records lang grant to a Buddhist congregation (vihāra).

The earliest four inscriptions (c. 300-350/400 CE) are in a Middle Indo-Aryan (MIA) language, while the later inscriptions are in Sanskrit. The MIA inscriptions feature Sanskrit portions: Theo Damsteegt characterizes the language as Epigraphical Hybrid Sanskrit, while Richard Salomon describes the inscriptions as "bilingual (Prakrit and Sanskrit)".

Hastivarman dedicated land grants to Jayasarman as mentioned in his Urlam plates.

== List of kings ==
1. Devavarma
2. Hastiverma
3. Nandi Verma
4. Vijayadeva Verma
5. Vijayanandi Verma
