= Muktidham =

Coordinates: 19.951°N 73.836°E

Muktidham is a marble temple complex honouring various Hindu gods. It is a popular tourist attraction situated in the Nashik Road suburb of the city of Nashik in the State of Maharashtra in India. It is privately operated through a trust and was built through a generous donation by the late Mr. J.D. Chauhan-Bytco, a local industrialist. The temple was founded in the year 1971.

It has replicas of 12 Jyotirlingas, which have been built as per dimension of original deities and have been sanctified by sending them to their respective pilgrimage centers.

Further, there is a temple dedicated to Lord Krishna in the Muktidham complex. The walls of Krishna temple has paintings depicting scenes from life of Krishna and Mahabharata. These were painted by a noted painter Raghubir Mulgaonkar, whose services were employed by the founder of Muktidham, Jairambhai Chauhan. Also unique to this temple are eighteen chapters of Geeta written on the walls.

The temple is made with marble from Makrana in Rajasthan, and by Rajasthani sculptors.

Apart from the replicas of all the twelve Jyotirlingas, temple of Sri Krishna there are also idols of all major Hindu Gods and Goddesses like Vishnu, Laxmi Rama, Laxman, Sita, Hanuman, Durga, Ganesha.

Muktidham is amongst the tourist attraction of town. Thousands of Hindu devotees visit Muktidham Temple during Kumbh Mela.

Further, the complex also houses a dharamshala, which can accommodate at least 200 pilgrims.
