= Nashik Road =

- Suburb
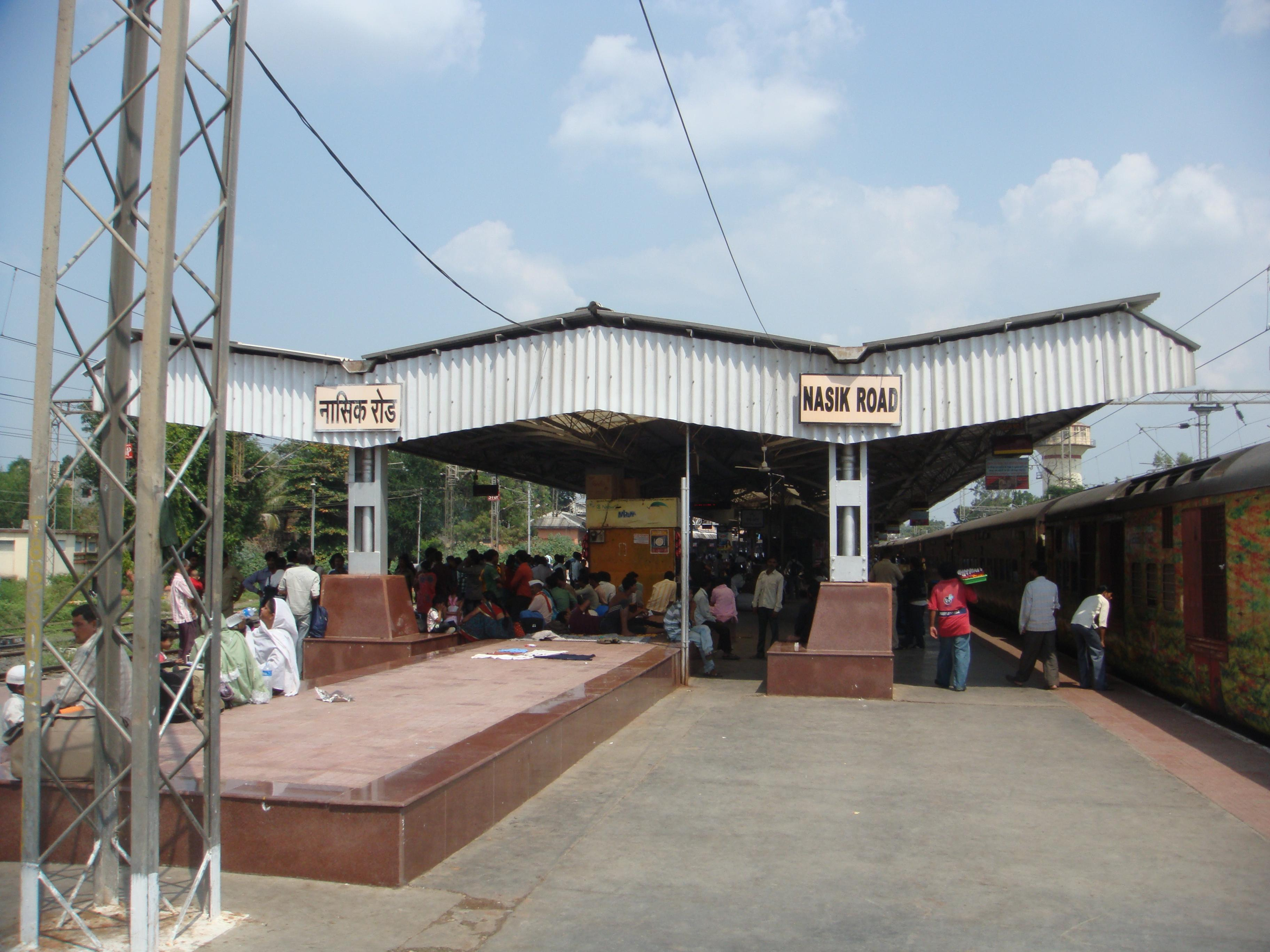
- Interactive map of Nashik Road
- Country: India
- State: Maharashtra
- District: Nashik

Languages
  - Official: Marathi
- Time zone: UTC+5:30 (IST)

Nashik Road (sometimes referred to as Nasik Road) is a suburb of Nashik that contains the city's railway station. The name 'Nashik Road' was originally used for the town surrounding the station (about 8 km or 5 miles southwest from the heart of Nashik city) and parts of the adjoining Deolali village, but has been administratively merged with the Nashik Municipal Corporation since the year 1984. Nashik Road is one of the fastest growing suburbs of the area, with almost 575,000 residents.

== Transport ==
=== Road ===
The Mumbai-Agra Highway (NH3), Nashik-Pune Highway (NH 50), Peth Road, Wani Road, Bhagur-Nashik Road (Lam road), and Jail Road are among the major roads in the city, alongside residential and commercial neighborhoods. The first road overpass of the city (named 'Swatantryaveer Vinayak Damodar Savarkar flyover') is Nashik Road and goes over the NH 50.

=== Railway ===
Nashik Road railway station was built by Bhagwant Singh Kapoor's local construction company. This railway station is an important stop on the Mumbai-Bhusawal-Delhi and Mumbai-Bhusawal-Nagpur-Kolkata Central Railway routes. Heavy passenger traffic is a daily feature of the sector. In 2017, the government of Maharashtra and the Ministry of Railways unveiled a joint venture to construct a 248-km track to enable train service between Nashik Road and Pune. Similarly, the Rajya Rani Express train started running from Nashik to Mumbai in 2011.

=== Air ===
Nashik Road hosts Gandhinagar Airport (operated in conjunction with the Indian Air Force), which is srictly used for defence purposes.

== Tourism ==
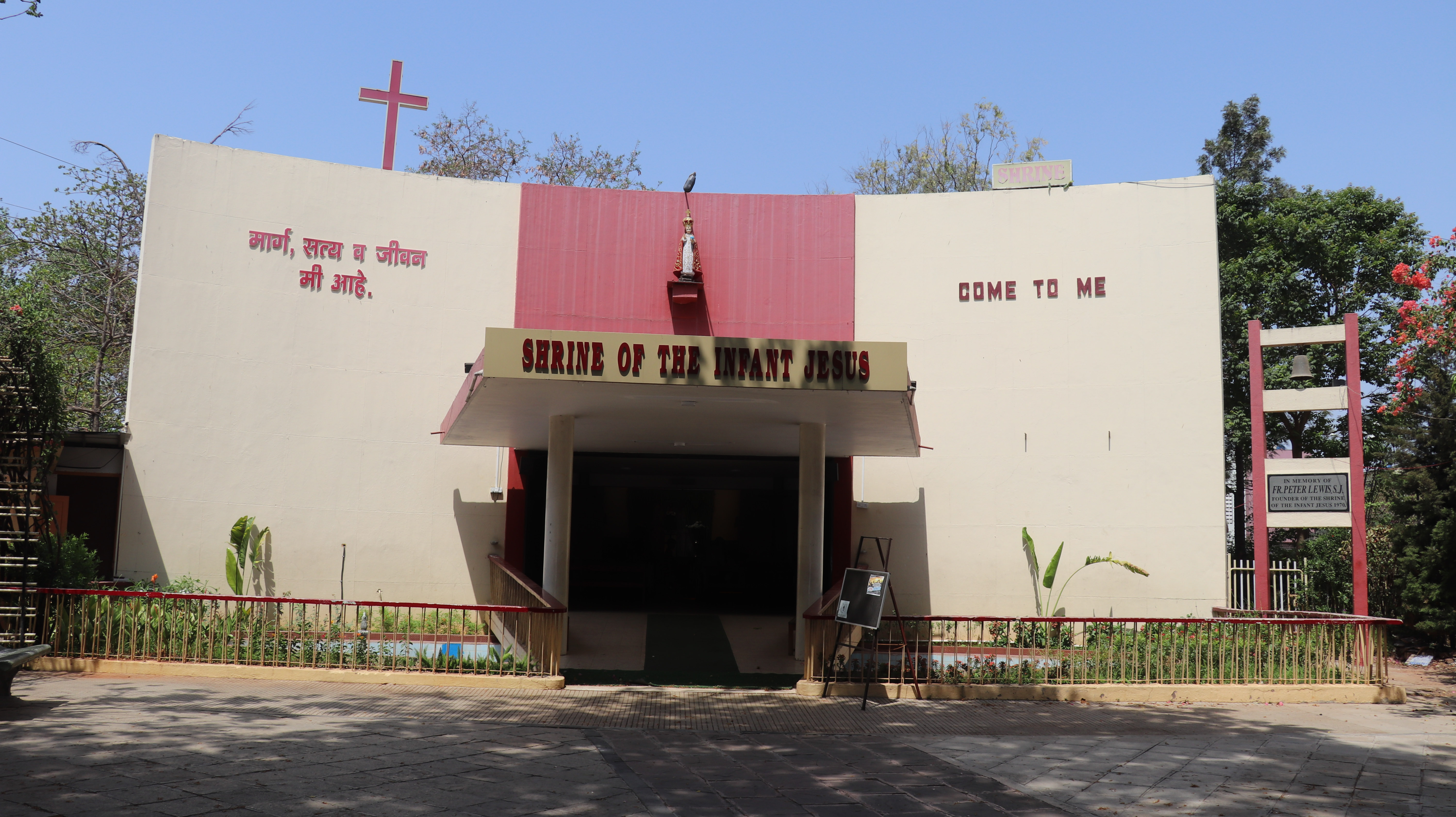
Shrine of the Infant Jesus established here in 1970 is a popular tourist attraction.

A fair is held each February to honor the religious idol. Triambakeshwar, one of the most notable holy sites of India, is near Nashik. Triambakeshwar is one of the twelve Jyotirlingas in India. It is sacred for multiple reasons. Godavari river originates from this place. It is a place of Tri-Sandhya Gayatri. It is the birthplace of Lord Ganesha. It is a place of the first Nath of Nath Sampradaya consisting of Gorakhnath and others. Nivrittinath was made to imbibe the holy knowledge by his Guru Gahininath there. Nivrittinath made his brothers and sister attain the self by his preaching there.
