= Nashik district =

Coordinates: 19°59′39″N 73°47′50″E

- District of Maharashtra
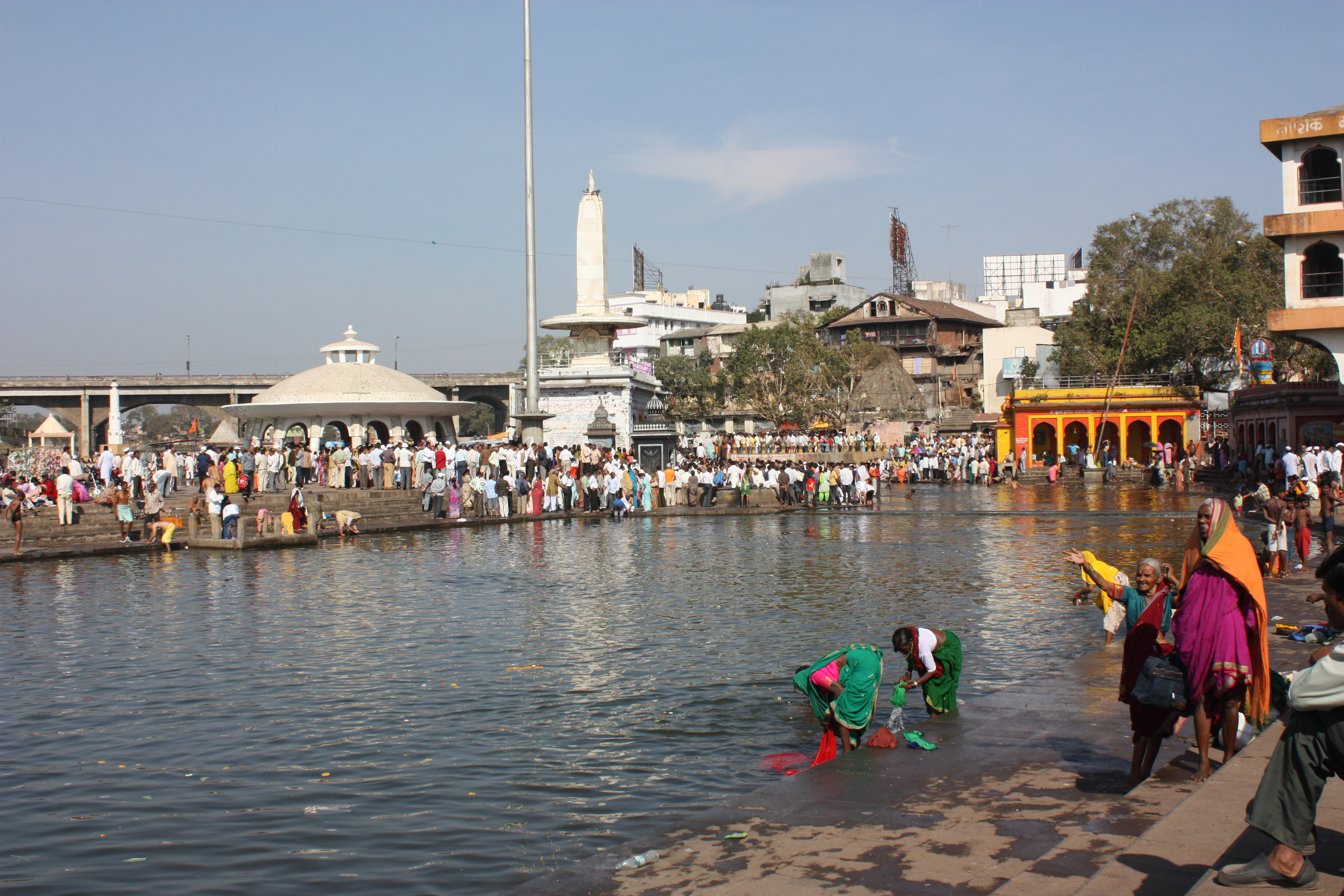
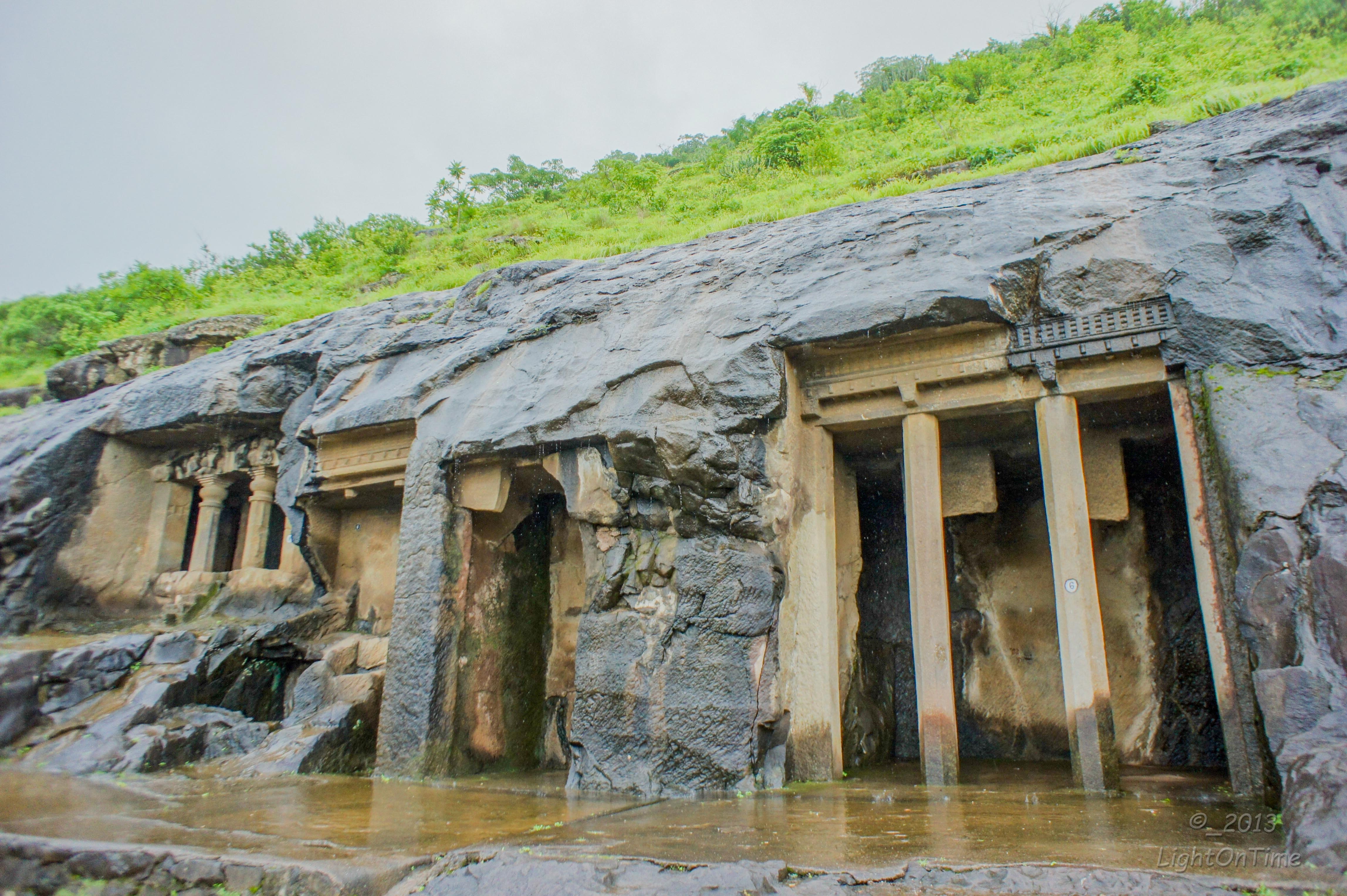
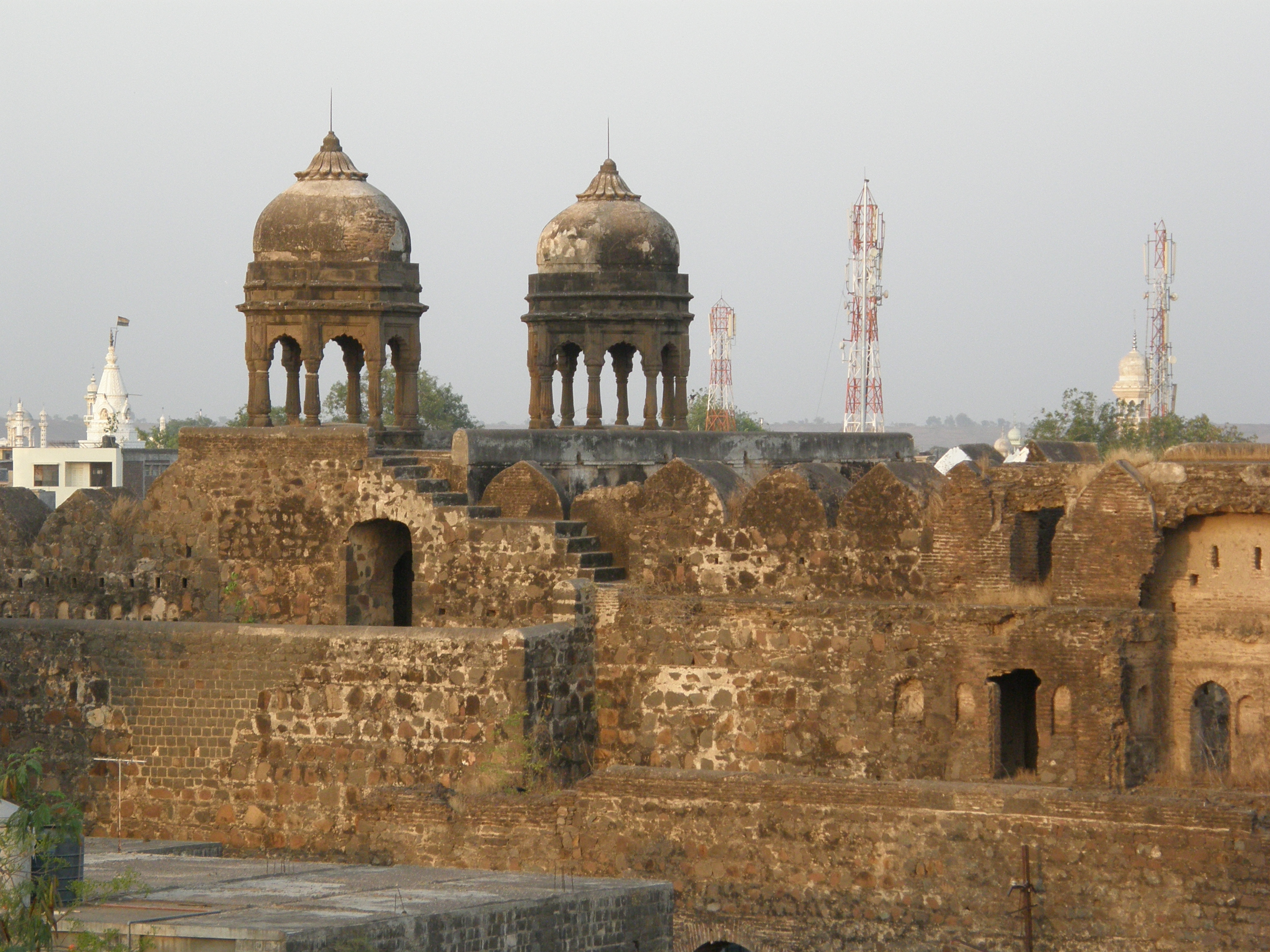
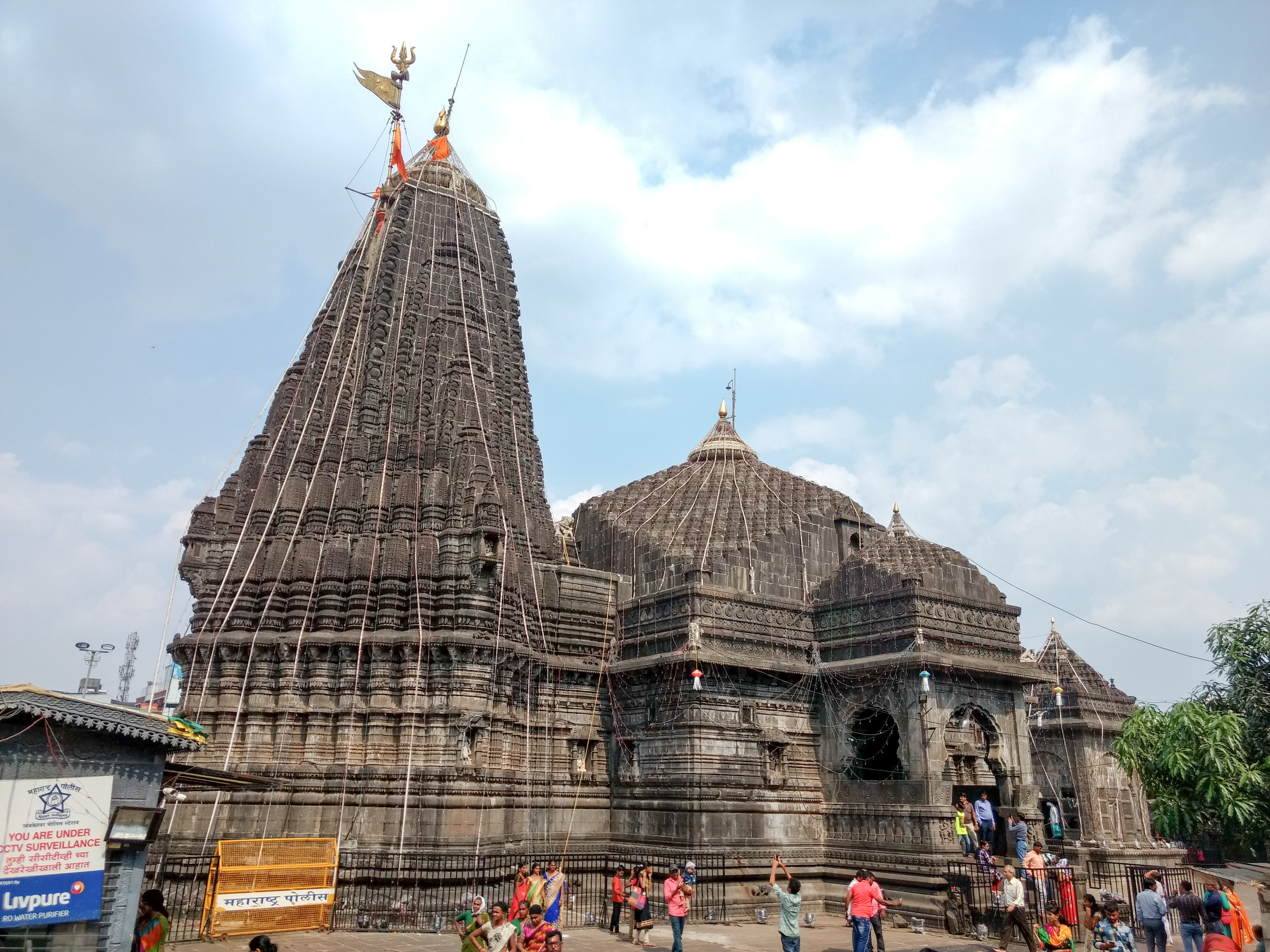
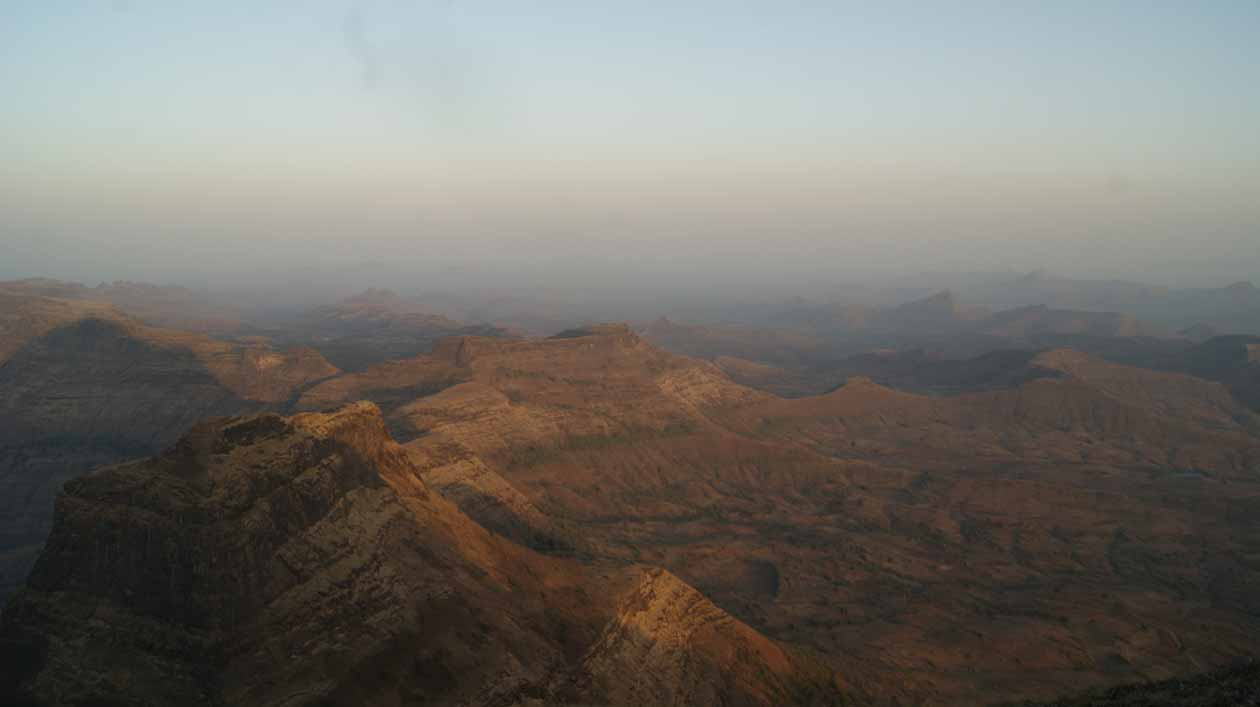
- Clockwise from top-left: Ramkund Ghat in Nashik, Pandavleni Caves, Triambakeshwar Temple in Trimbak, Salher Fort, Malegaon fort

- Location in Maharashtra
- Nashik district
- Country: India
- State: Maharashtra
- Division: Nashik
- Established: 1869; 157 years ago
- Headquarters: Nashik
- Tehsils: Nashik; Sinnar; Igatpuri; Trimbak; Niphad; Yeola; Peth; Dindori; Chandwad; Baglan; Deola; Kalwan; Malegaon; Nandgaon; Surgana

Government
  - Type: Zilla Parishad
  - Body: Nashik Zilla Parishad
  - Guardian Minister: Devendra Fadnavis (additional charge)
  - President Zilla Parishad: President Balasaheb Ramnath Kshirsagar; Vice President NA
  - District Collector: Mr. Ayush Prasad, IAS
  - CEO Zilla Parishad: NA
  - MPs: Rajabhau Waje (Nashik); Bhaskar Bhagare (Dindori)

Area
  - Total: 15,582 km^{2} (6,016 sq mi)

Population (2011)
  - Total: 8,107,186
  - Rank: 8th (In India), 3rd (In Maharashtra)
  - Density: 520.29/km^{2} (1,347.5/sq mi)
  - Urban: 42.53%

Demographics
  - Literacy: 80.96%
  - Sex ratio: 931 ♀ / 1000 ♂
- Time zone: UTC+05:30 (IST)
- Vehicle registration: MH 15 (Nashik city); MH 41 (Malegaon)
- Major highways: NH-3, NH-60
- Website: nashik.gov.in

Nashik district, formerly known as Nasik district, is a district in Maharashtra, India. The city of Nashik is the administrative headquarters of the district. Nashik is well known for the production of wine. Nashik is also known as Mini Maharashtra, because the climate and soil conditions of Surgana, Peth, Igatpuri resembles the Konkan region; Niphad, Sinnar, Dindori, Baglan blocks are like Western Maharashtra; and Yeola, Nandgaon, Chandwad blocks are like the Vidarbha Region. Nashik is the biggest city in the district while Malegaon is the second biggest city. Manmad, Igatpuri, and Sinnar are some of the big cities situated in Nashik District. Manmad is one of the biggest railway junctions in India while the city of Malegaon is famous for its power looms.

Nashik district is the third largest district in Maharashtra state in terms of population of 8,107,187 and occupying an area of 15,582 square kilometres in the north Maharashtra region. It is bounded by Dhule district to the north, Jalgaon district to the east, Aurangabad District to the southeast, Ahmadnagar district to the south, Thane district to the southwest, Valsad and Navsari districts of Gujarat to the west, and The Dangs district of Gujarat state to the northwest.

The Western Ghats or Sahyadri range stretches from north to south across the western portion of the district. With the exception of the westernmost few villages, the western portion is hilly, and intersected by ravines, and only the simplest kind of cultivation is possible. The western slope of the Ghats is drained by several rivers, including the Daman Ganga River, which drains westwards to the Arabian Sea.

The larger eastern portion of the district, which lies on the Deccan Plateau, is open, fertile, and well cultivated. The Satmala-Chandwad Range, which runs east and west, forms the chief divide of the plateau region. Peninsular India's largest river, the Godavari, originates in the district in the Trimbakeshwar Range and continues eastwards through the district. The Satmala-Chandwad Range forms a watershed, such that the rivers emerging to its south drain into the Godavari. These include the Kadva and Darna, both of which are tributaries of the Godavari. To the north of the Satmala-Chandwad Range, the Girna River and its tributary, the Mosam, flow eastward through fertile valleys into the Tapti River.

The Trimbakeshwar Shiva Temple is located in Trimbak, one of the twelve Jyotirlingas, where a set of Hindu genealogy registers at Trimbakeshwar are maintained. The origin of the sacred Godavari River is at Brahmagiri peak near Trimbak.

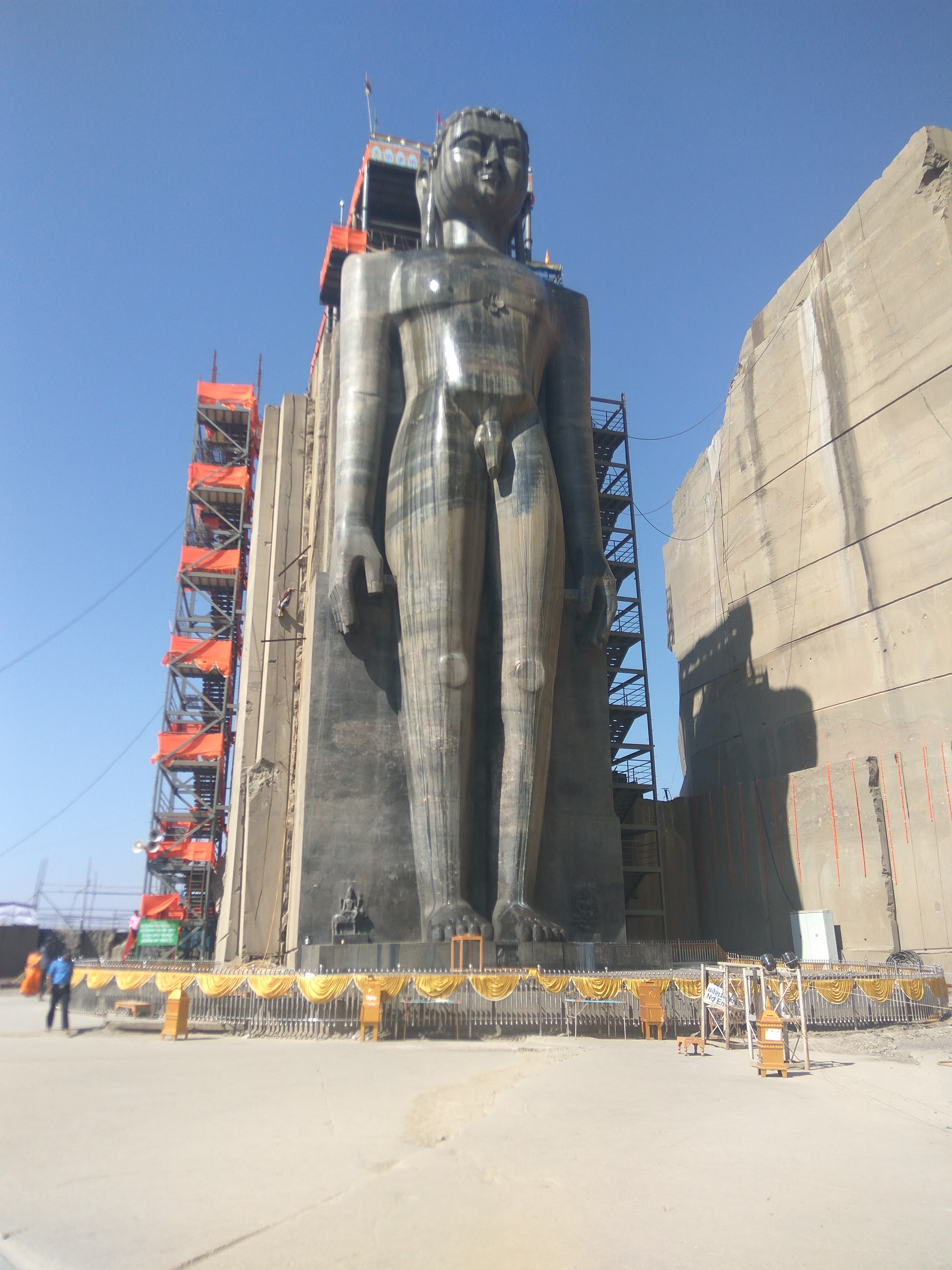
108 feet Rishabdev Bhagwan at Mangi Tungi

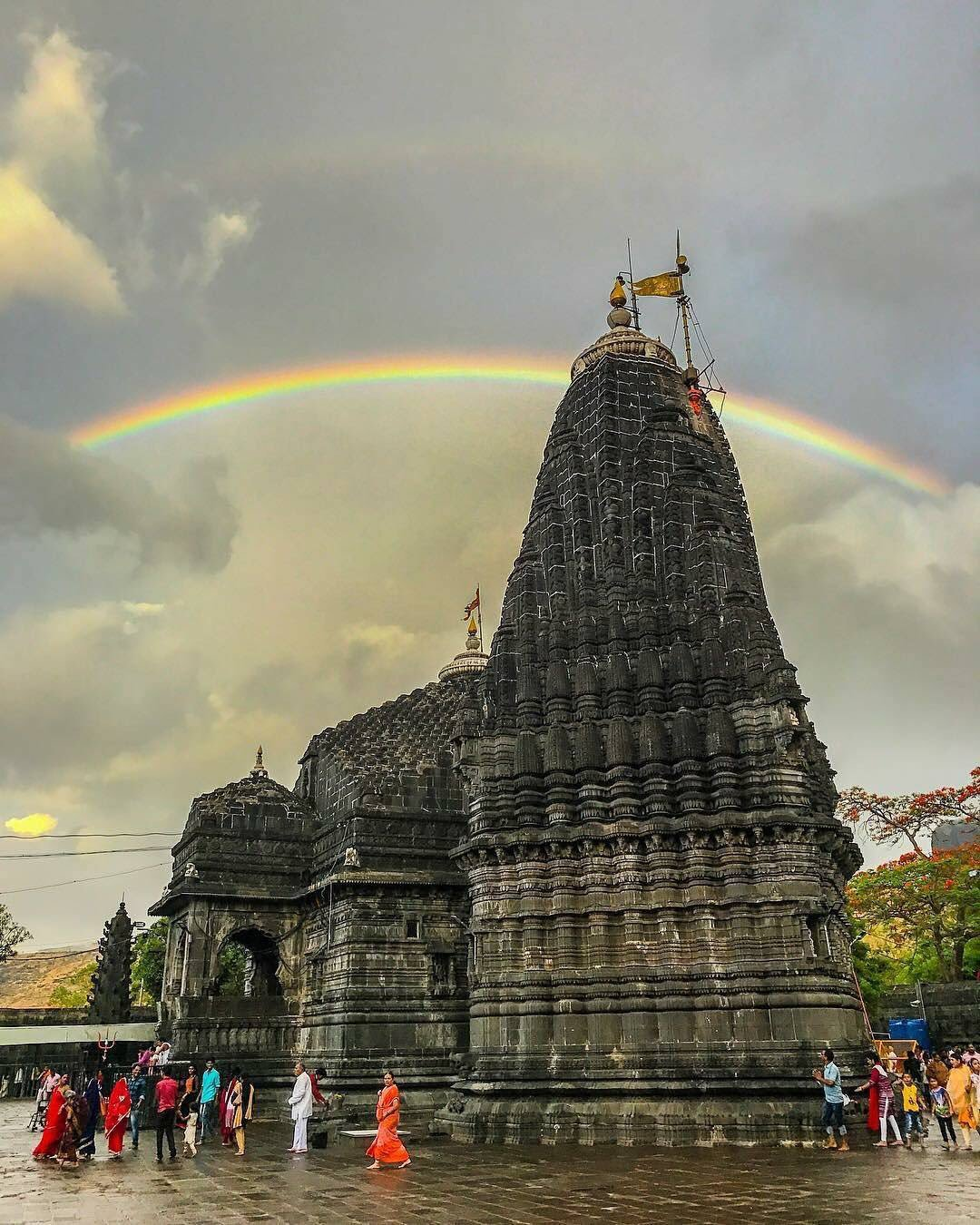
Trimbakeshwar Temple near Nashik

In February 2016, the Statue of Ahimsa, a 108 ft idol of the first Jain tirthankara Rishabhdev carved in monolithic stone was consecrated at Mangi Tungi. It is recorded in the Guinness Book of World Records as the tallest Jain idol in the world.

== History ==
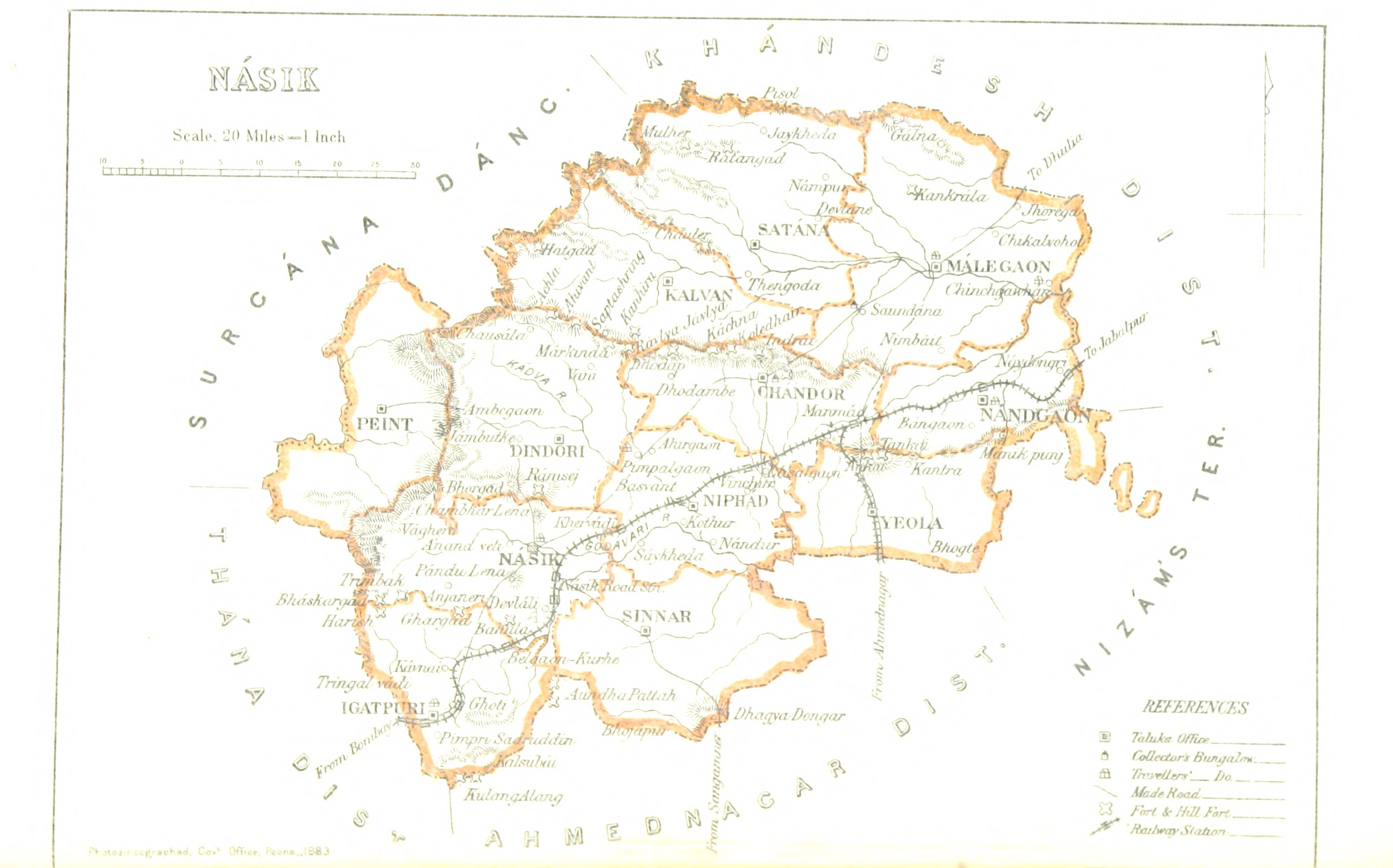
Nasik district 1896

=== Ancient ===
Archaeological excavations indicate the territory around Nashik was occupied in the early Stone Age. Cleavers, scrapers and hand axes have been found in Gangavadi. Other excavations from the Chalcolithic age indicate the region was occupied by a pastoral and hunting people. According to the Ramayana, Rama stayed in the region for a time in caves now called Sita Gufa, and killed Rakshasas who were harassing rishis. From here Ravana abducted Sita.

The earliest mention of Nashik comes from a Varttika (commentary) by Katyanana on the Panini Sutra, where he calls the town of Nashika a Nagara. It is mentioned again in the Brihatsamhita of Varamihira, as well as the Vayu, Varaha and other Puranas, as a Tirtha (pilgrimage). At the time Govardhana was the main town in the region. The Mauryas ruled Nashik, and after them came the Satavahanas. The Satavahanas, originally called Andhras, came from western Maharashtra as indicated by inscriptions near Nashik. Initially the Satavahana kingdom under its first king Simuka contained Nashik district, and under his successor Krishna his Mahamatra (governor) made caves for Buddhist monks in Nashik. The king Satakarni I expanded his kingdom, but during his reign Kharavela of Kalinga raided Vidarbha. Soon the Saka Kshatrapas conquered Nashik from the Satavahanas, who were forced to retreat southeast to a small territory around their capital Pratishthana. Nashik was ruled by the Saka king Nahapana in the 1st century CE. Nahapana's son in law, Ushadevata, described his charitable contributions of donating villages to gods and Brahmins, and constructing infrastructure such as dharamshalas and ferries, in inscriptions in the Pandavleni Gutta Caves. He had a cave excavated near Nashik for Buddhist monks and assigned a village to Bhikkus for their maintenance.

Later the Satavahanas under Gautamiputra Sakarni defeated Nahapana and restored their rule in Nashik, as evidenced by an inscription in the Nashik Caves. During Satavahana times, Nashik district was very prosperous. It was on the highway from Prathisthana to Bharuch, and therefore was important for trade.

In 250 CE the Abhiras under Ishwarasena displaced the Satavahanas, and patronized Buddhist works near Nashik. In the west of the district ruled the Traikutakas, whose name derives from Trikuta Hill, where inscriptions of the kings Indradatta, Dahrasena and Vyaghrasena are found. During Vyaghrasena's reign, the Traikutakas were feudatories of the Vakatakas. The Vakatakas then took over Nashik and ruled it until their downfall around the turn of the 6th century CE. Afterwards, Vishnukundin ruler Madhavavarman extended his rule to Nashik.

In 550 however, the Vishnukundinas were displaced by the Kalachuris of Mahishmati. Coins of Kalachuri king Krishnaraja have been found in Nashik district. However the Kalahchuris under Buddharaja were defeated by the Chalukyas under Mangalesha, and were made their feudatories. Under his successor Pulakeshin II, Nashik was formally annexed into the Chalukya empire. Several scholars have claimed Xuanzang met Pulakeshin in what is now Nashik district. After the defeat of the Kalachuris, the Chalukyas assigned the Sendrakas to govern southern Gujarat and Khandesh, including Nashik. When Pulakeshin II was killed by the Pallavas, his son Vikramaditya II appointed his brother Jayasimha to govern Nashik.

During the 7th and 8th centuries, Nashik was ruled by a feudal family who claimed descent from Harishchandra. However this family was overthrown by the Rashtrakutas under Dantidurga. Afterwards, the Rashtrakutas held this territory and there are records of land grants to Brahmins from king Govinda III. The Rashtrakutas eventually became weak and were replaced by the Western Chalukyas.

The Seuna dynasty, or Yadava dynasty, originated around Nashik, with their first ruler, Dridhapahara, ruling from Srinagara, now in Nashik district. His successor Seunachandra lent his name to the country, Seunadesha, and his empire extended from Nashik to Devagiri. In Anjaneri near Nashik ruled a minor branch of the Yadavas. Originally feudatories of the Western Chalukyas, the Yadavas expanded their empire, defeating the Kakakiyas, Paramaras and other foes, and shifted their capital to Devagiri.

=== Medieval ===
In 1298 however, Alauddin Khilji's army invaded the Yadavas and forced king Ramachandra to pay tribute. At this time, his power extended to Baglana in what is now Nashik district. Near Baglana ruled Rai Kiran, the last king of the Vaghela Dynasty, who had sought shelter with the Yadavas after his kingdom fell to Khilji. When Ramachandra's successor stopped payment in 1311, Malik Kafur killed the Yadava king and annexed his domains into the Delhi Sultanate.

In 1342, Sultan Muhammad Tughluq defeated rebels in Gujarat on the banks of the Narmada river, with many of the most important rebel leaders fleeing south into the mountains. There Man Dev, ruler of the mountainous region of Salher and Malher, took the rebels captive and seized their goods. A large portion of Nashik fell under the province of Daulatabad in the Delhi Sultanate.

In 1347, when the Delhi Sultanate lost control of the Deccan and the Bahmani Sultanate rose, much of Nashik became independent. Parts of Nashik continued to be under the province of Daulatabad under the Bahmanis, but neither they or the Delhi Sultanate had any control over the Chandvad or Satmala Hills, or Baglana. In 1366, when the Bahamani sultan had to withdraw troops for fighting elsewhere in the Deccan, the Baglana chief took part in an unsuccessful Maratha revolt along with Bahram Khan against the Bahamanis. At the turn of the 15th century, Baglana had become a tributary to the Gujarat Sultanate. During a war between the Bahmani and Gujarat Sultanates, Ahmad Shah Bahmani ravaged Baglana and tried to take the fort of Tambol.

Near the end of the 15th century, a Maratha chieftain took the fort of Galna near Malegaon and plundered the surrounding land. In 1487 the governor of Daulatabad, Malik Ashraf, along with his brother Malik Wagi, retook Galna and restored peace to the roads so that merchants were safe again. In 1498, the Ahmadnagar, Bijapur and Berar Sultanates made an alliance under which Galna became part of Ahmadnagar. in 1499, Ahmad Nizam Shah subjugated the ruler of Galna, but after Malik Wagi's murder the local chiefs of Nashik reasserted their independence. In 1507, Ahmad Nizam Shah reconquered the chiefs, but after his death in 1508, the ruler of Galna threw off Sultanate rule again. He was only brought to heel again in 1530, when Burhan Nizam Shah stormed the fort.

At this time, the Gujarat Sultanate was at its most powerful and included Nashik, Trimbakeshwar and Baglana, whose chief was a tributary to Gujarat. Meanwhile, the Galna chiefs again regained their independence, and it was only in 1559 when Burhan Nizam Shah would pacify them. At this time, he also laid siege to Mushir-Mulher fort, but lifted the siege after a letter from Gujarat informed him the fort was under their protection. The Baglana chiefs continued to pay tribute and send soldiers to Gujarat.

=== Mughal ===
In 1573, after he was defeated, rebel Mirza Sharaf-ud-din Hussein fled towards the Deccan, but was captured by the Raja of Baglana, who surrendered the rebel to Mughal emperor Akbar. After the annexation of Khandesh in 1599, Akbar attempted to take Baglana and laid siege to it for 7 years. However, because of the plentiful food and pastures as well as the difficulty of marching through the passes, Akbar was forced to negotiate with the chief Pratapshah. In the Ain-i-Akbari, Baglan is described as mountainous and containing 8000 cavalry and 5000 infantry with seven forts, of which Mulher and Salher were particularly strong.

Elsewhere, the district enjoyed peace under Salabat Khan, the minister of the Ahmadnagar Sultanate. However, in 1600, Ahmadnagar fell to the Mughals and Nashik fort fell soon after in 1601. Most of Nashik then fell into the hands of Mian Raju, who divided the territory with his rival Malik Ambar. After Raju's defeat to Malik Ambar, Nashik again enjoyed peace. However, in 1611, the Mughals launched another invasion of Ahmadnagar led by Abdullah Khan, which passed through Nashik. When Malik Ambar and the Marathas crushed this invasion, the remnants fled back to Baglana.

Early in the reign of Shah Jahan, the Mughals launched 8000 cavalry, bolstered with 400 cavalry from Baglana, to take Nashik, Trimbak and Sangamner and to crush a rebellion by the former governor of Malwa. They were soon reinforced and ravaged much of what is now Nashik district. At this time Shahuji Bhosle now claimed rulership over much of Nashik, and was soon to be given Galna fort, but it was taken by the Mughals. In 1633, Shah Jahan himself came to the Deccan and conquered the various hill forts in Nashik district from Shahaji. In 1637, the Mughals under then-governor Aurangzeb decided to conquer Baglana, which soon submitted. French merchant Tavernier noted Baglana was particularly wealthy due to being on the trade route between Surat and Golconda.

=== Maratha ===
In 1664, Chhatrapati Shivaji Maharaj marched through Nashik district to sack Surat. in 1670, he attacked the Mughals again, entered Baglana and captured several forts in the region. In October 1670, Shivaji sacked Surat again, and while he was returning he was intercepted by the Mughals between Vani and Dindori in Nashik district. He defeated the Mughals in the Battle of Vani Dindori. Eventually Shivaji captured Samner. For some time afterwards, Shivaji and the Mughals engaged in back-and-forth raiding, but in 1672 another battle was fought before Salher, where the Marathas destroyed the Mughal force.

In 1681, Muhammad Akbar, a son of Aurangzeb, fled through Baglana on his way to seek shelter in Sambhaji's court. Nashik was the site of many other battles between the Marathas and Mughals, and forts were taken and re-taken constantly. At the time of Aurangzeb's death, Nashik was part of the Sangamner Sarkar under Aurangabad Subah, while Baglana was part of the Khandesh subah.

In 1715, Khandoji Dabhade collected chauth on behalf of the Maratha Emperor, particularly targeting merchants coming from Surat. The Mughals sent an expedition against him but were utterly crushed in the mountains near Nashik. Another expedition failed to stop the Marathas. The Sayyid brothers then ruling Delhi sought a negotiated peace, and Peshwa Balaji Vishwanath negotiated a peace which saw the Marathas gaining grants of Chauth and Sardeshmukhi over Nashik, the northern part of which comprised the districts of Bagalana and Galna, although the territory was still nominally under Mughal control.

However Nizam-ul-Mulk soon gained power in the Deccan and became independent, and held present-day Nashik district. When Trimbakrao Dabhade, supported by the Nizam, rose up against Bajirao I, the Nizam ravaged the territory of the enemy chiefs of Baglana and other areas in northern Nashik, but he and Dabhade were crushed. Soon the Nizam's own son, who controlled Baglana fort, rebelled, and rebellion spread to other parts in the district, but this was soon crushed.

In 1751, Nizam Salabat Jung led a campaign against the Marathas. Meanwhile, the Marathas intended to install Salabat Jung's brother Gaziuddin as Nizam in return for ceding all lands between the Tapi and Godavari to the west of Berar. Although Gaziuddin died suddenly, allegedly due to poisoning, the Marathas surrounded Salabat Jung at Bhalki and forced him to give up the territory Gaziuddin had agreed to. So Nashik officially became part of the Maratha Empire.

In 1768, Raghunathrao, who had fallen out of favour with the Peshwa, rebelled at Nashik. Although he failed in this rebellion, he soon murdered his nephew Narayan Rao, then the Peshwa and usurped the seat, but was soon forced to flee to the English. During the First Anglo-Maratha War, the Kolis of Khandesh were incited to rebellion by Raghunathrao, but this was soon crushed. In 1802, a civil war broke out in the Maratha camp and Pindari raiders devastated Nashik, resulting in a famine. During the famine the Bhils fled to the hills, and after the famine raided the plains villages. The Marathas responded with brutal massacres of the Bhils, but this failed to stop the raiding, and landlords soon hired Arab mercenaries who soon became the main moneylenders.

During the Third Anglo-Maratha War the Holkars were forced to give up northern Khandesh. In 1818, Trimbakji Dengle organised the Bhils to fight against the British. However, eventually the district fell to the British.

=== British ===
In the 18th century, present-day Nashik district was part of the Maratha Confederacy, within the territory controlled directly by the Maratha Peshwa. The district contains several old hill forts, the scenes of many engagements during the Anglo-Maratha Wars. The district became British territory in 1818 after the overthrow of the Peshwa. The present-day district was initially divided between Kandesh and Ahmadnagar districts of Bombay Presidency, a province of British India. Nashik district was created in 1869. The population in 1901 was 816,504, showing a decrease of 3% in the decade 1891–1901. The principal crops were millet, wheat, pulse, oil-seeds, cotton and sugar cane. There were also some vineyards, and much garden cultivation. Yeola was an important centre for weaving silk and cotton goods. There were flour-mills at Malegaon, railway workshops at Manmad and Igatpuri, and cantonments at Deolali and Malegaon. At Sharanpur was a Christian village, with an orphanage of the Church Missionary Society, founded in 1854. In 1861 the main northeast line of the Great Indian Peninsula Railway was completed across the district, and in 1878 a chord line was completed between Manmad, on the northeast line in Nashik district, and Daund, on the southeast line in Pune district. From India's independence in 1947 up to 1960, Nashik district was part of Bombay State, which split into the states of Maharashtra and Gujarat.

== Geology ==
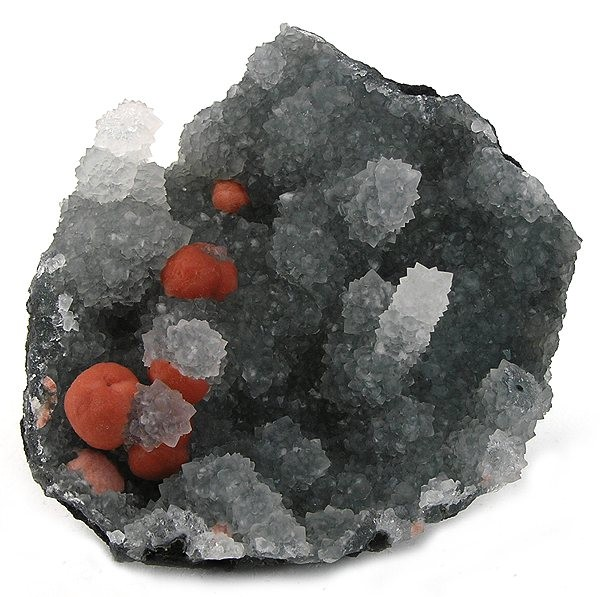
Red-orange fluorite balls on drusy quartz, Mahodari, Nasik District. These are considered to be the finest red fluorite balls in the world.

The entire Nashik district is underlain by basaltic lava flows. These flows are normally horizontally disposed over a wide stretch and give rise to a table land type of topography also known as a plateau. These flows occur in layered sequences and represented by massive unit at the bottom and vesicular unit at the top of the flow. The shallow alluvial formation of recent age also occurs as narrow stretch along the banks of the Godavari River. The soils are the weathering products of Basalt and have various shades from gray to black, red and pink colour.

== Geography ==
Nashik District is noted for the mountains and hills occupying the north and north-east of its territory. These hill ranges are eastward spurs of the Western Ghats and form prominent landmarks in the district, some noted for the shrines they harbor while others for the trekking adventures which can be undertaken while ascending the peaks. Broadly categorized, the hills can be segregated into 3 noteworthy ranges:

- Selbari Range which may be inclusive of the Dholbari range, alternately called Selbari-Dholbari range.
- Satmala Range also called the Satmala-Ajanta range.
- Trimbakeshwar Range constituting the Trimbak-Anjaneri hills.

== Climate ==
The region has a tropical savanna climate.

Extremes: max 42.4 °C (108.3 °F) on May 12, 1960, at Nasik. The lowest, also at Nasik, was 0.6 °C (33.1 °F) on January 7, 1945.

Climate data for Nashik district
Month	Jan	Feb	Mar	Apr	May	Jun	Jul	Aug	Sep	Oct	Nov	Dec	Year
Mean daily maximum °C (°F)	29 (84)	31 (88)	35 (95)	37 (99)	37 (99)	32 (90)	28 (82)	27 (81)	29 (84)	32 (90)	31 (88)	29 (84)	31 (88)
Mean daily minimum °C (°F)	10 (50)	12 (54)	16 (61)	20 (68)	22 (72)	23 (73)	22 (72)	21 (70)	21 (70)	18 (64)	14 (57)	12 (54)	18 (64)
Average precipitation mm (inches)	1.2 (0.05)	0.5 (0.02)	1.0 (0.04)	4.7 (0.19)	15.1 (0.59)	154.9 (6.10)	315.0 (12.40)	259.0 (10.20)	183.3 (7.22)	68.0 (2.68)	22.3 (0.88)	4.6 (0.18)	1,029.6 (40.55)
Source 1: wunderground.com
Source 2: data.gov.in

== Demographics ==
Historical population
Year	Pop.	±% p.a.
1901	823,080	—
1911	915,698	+1.07%
1921	845,783	−0.79%
1931	1,009,583	+1.79%
1941	1,127,597	+1.11%
1951	1,429,916	+2.40%
1961	1,855,246	+2.64%
1971	2,369,221	+2.48%
1981	2,991,739	+2.36%
1991	3,851,352	+2.56%
2001	4,993,796	+2.63%
2011	8,107,187	+4.96%

According to the 2011 census Nashik district has a population of 6,107,187, roughly equal to the nation of El Salvador, or the US state of Missouri. This gives it a ranking of 11th in India (out of a total of 640). The district has a population density of 393 inhabitants per square kilometre (1,020/sq mi). Its population growth rate over the decade 2001-2011 was 22.33%. Nashik has a sex ratio of 931 females for every 1000 males, and a literacy rate of 80.96%. 42.53% of the population lived in urban areas. Scheduled Castes and Scheduled Tribes make up 9.08% and 25.62% of the population respectively.

=== Religion ===
Religions in Nashik district (2011)
Religion	Percent
Hinduism	85.75%
Islam	11.35%
Buddhism	1.55%
Jainism	0.63%
Other or not stated	0.72%

Hinduism is the main religion, and is over 97% in rural areas. Islam and Buddhism are smaller religions. Malegaon, the second-largest city, is a Muslim-majority city.

Nashik is a center of Hindu pilgrimage as the source of the Godavari River. There are many ancient Buddhist monuments in the region.

=== Language ===
Languages in Nashik district (2011)
1. Marathi (72.4%)
2. Urdu (8.56%)
3. Khandeshi (5.74%)
4. Hindi (5.15%)
5. Bhili (2.44%)
6. Kukna (2.08%)
7. Other (3.61%)

At the time of the 2011 Census of India, 72.42% of the population in the district spoke Marathi, 8.56% Urdu, 5.74% Khandeshi, 5.15% Hindi, 2.44% Bhili and 2.08% Kukna as their first language.

Marathi is the official and main language spoken. Bhil languages are spoken in the northwest of the district, while Khandeshi is the dialect of the northeastern part of the district.

== Divisions ==
Administratively, the district is divided into fifteen talukas, which are grouped into four sub-divisions:

- Nashik sub-division: Dindori, Igatpuri, Nashik, Nashik Road, Peth, Trimbakeshwar,
- Malegaon sub-division: Chandwad, Malegaon, Nandgaon
- Niphad sub-division: Niphad, Sinnar, Yeola
- Kalwan sub-division, Deola, Kalwan, Baglan (Satana), Surgana
- Nashik district is under proposal to be bifurcated and a separate Malegaon District be carved out of existing Nashik district with the inclusion of the north eastern parts of Nashik district which include Malegaon, Nandgaon, Deola, Baglan, and Kalwan talukas in the proposed Malegaon district.

== Administration ==
=== Members of Parliament ===
- Rajabhau Waje (SS UBT)
  (Nashik)
- Bhaskar Bhagare Sir (NCP SP)
  (Dindori)
- Shobha Bachhav (INC)
  (Dhule)

* Dhule Includes Malegaon Central, Malegaon Outer & Baglan constituencies of Nashik district.

=== Guardian Minister ===
- Devendra Fadnavis
  (additional charge)
  29 January 2025 - Incumbent

=== District Magistrate / Collector ===
- Ayush Prasad (IAS)
  (2025 – present)

== Places of interest ==
The Nashik-Trimbakeshwar Simhastha (Kumbha Mela) is held after every twelve years at Nashik.

- Malegaon
- Galna
- Trimbakeshwar One of the twelve Jyotirlingas
- Vani or SaptaShrungi
- Muktidham
- Kalaram Temple
- Ozar
- Kalsubai
- Chandwad
- Someshwar
- Gondeshwar Temple, Sinnar
- Mangi Tungi
- Devlali
- Manmad
- Ankai Fort
- Yeola
- Sula Vineyards

== See also ==
- Koli rebellions
- List of Koli people
- List of Koli states and clans
