= Pedavegi =

Pedavegi Vengipuram
- village
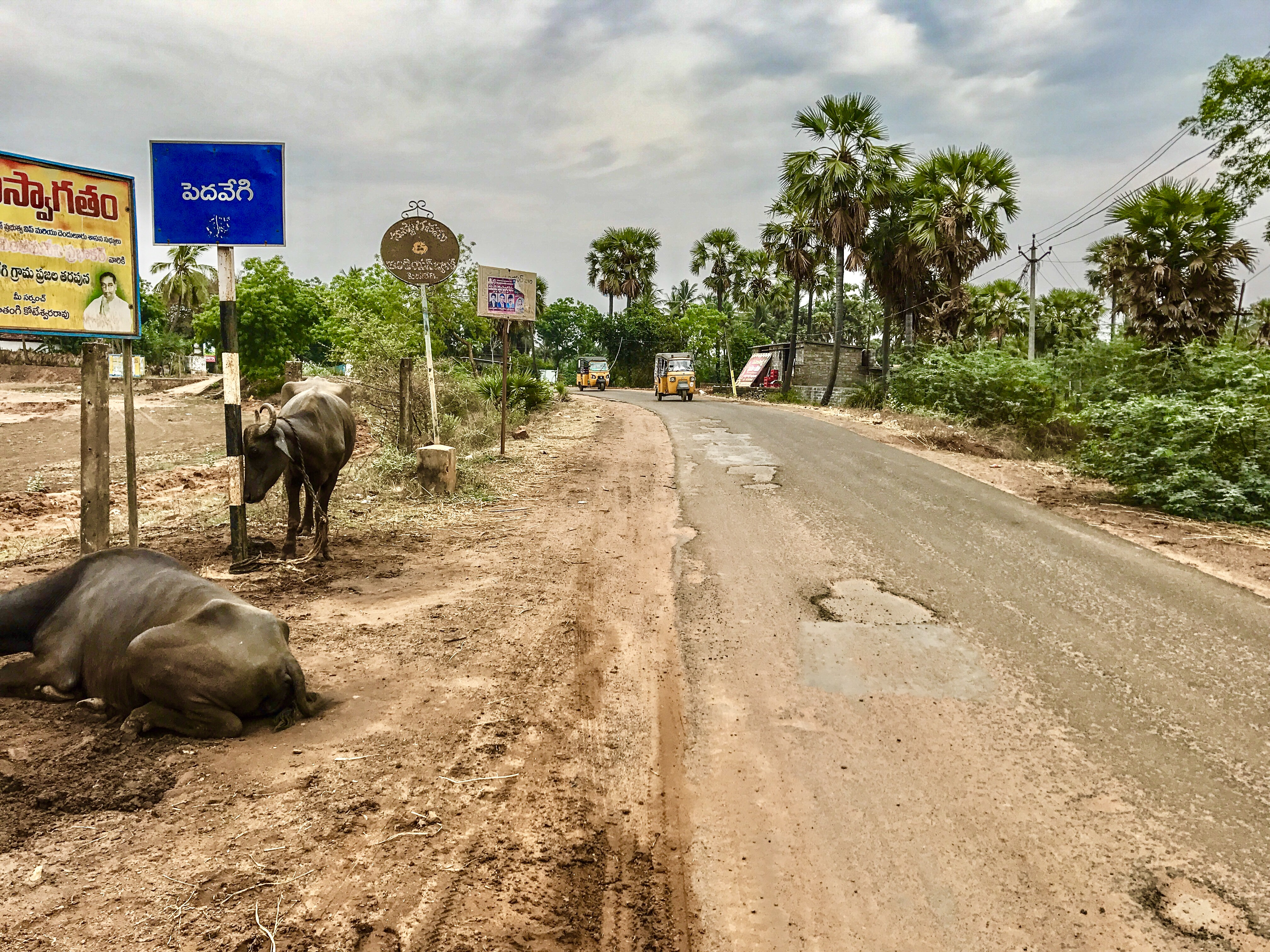
- Pedavegi Village Board
- Interactive map of Pedavegi
- Location in Andhra Pradesh, India Pedavegi (India)
- Coordinates: 16.770809°N 81.103864°E
- Country: India
- State: Andhra Pradesh
- District: Eluru

Population (2011)
  - Total: 11,846

Languages
  - Official: Telugu
- Time zone: UTC+5:30 (IST)
- PIN: 534450
- Telephone code: 08812
- Vehicle registration: AP

Pedavegi is a village in Eluru district in the state of Andhra Pradesh in India, 10 km north of Eluru. It is administered under Eluru revenue division. Pedavegi also serves as the mandal headquarters of Pedavegi mandal. The nearest railway station is Denduluru (DEL) located at a distance of 9.15 km.

== Etymology ==
It was formerly known as Vengipuram.

== History ==
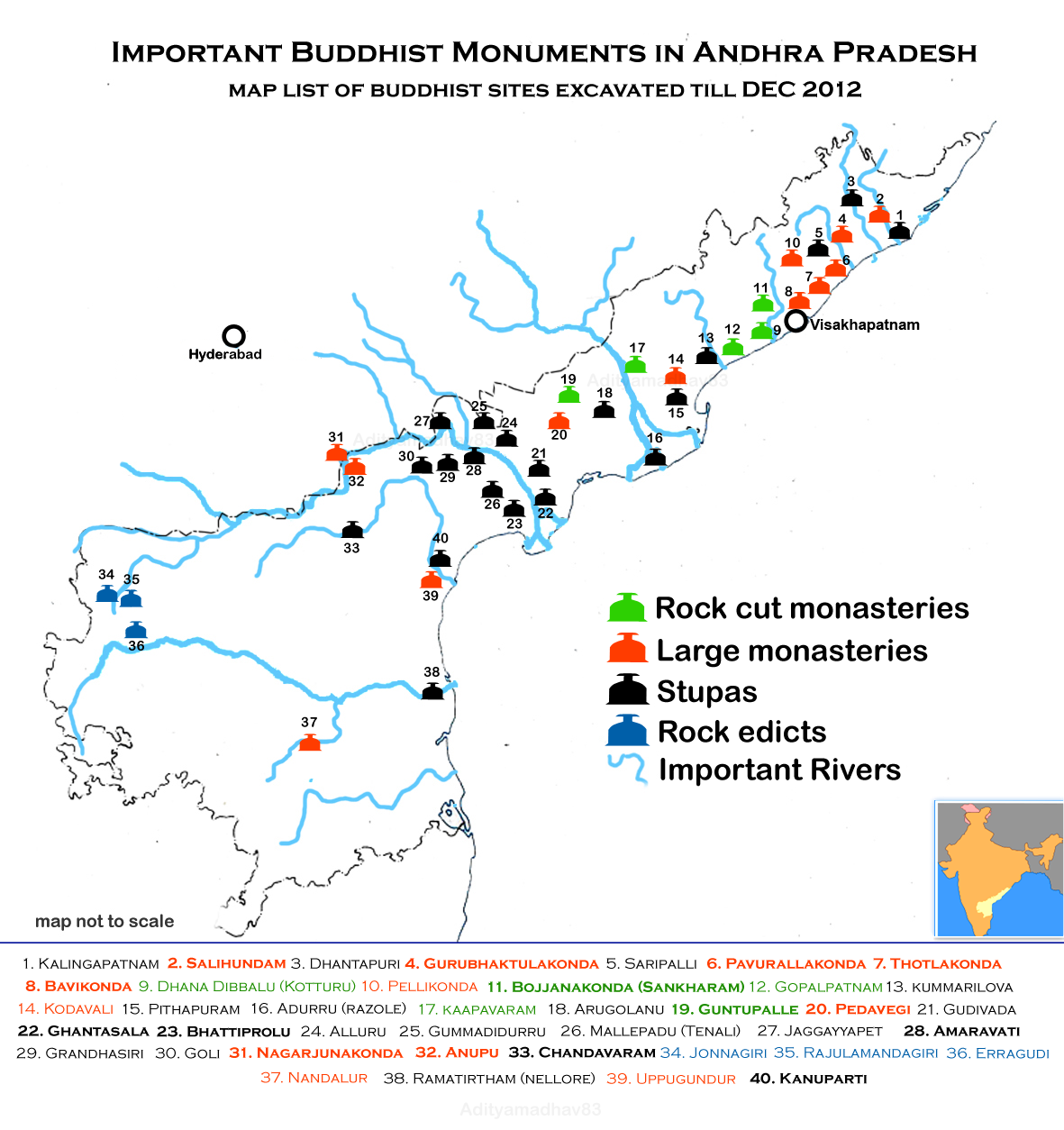
Buddhist Centres in Andhra Pradesh

Peddavegi, historically known as Vengipura in West Godavari, served as the capital of the Salankayana, Vishnukundin, and Chalukyan dynasties from the 3rd to 11th centuries A.D. Coins from these dynasties have been found at the site. Huien Tsang mentioned a stupa built by Ashoka, which later lost significance during the Vishnukundin period and was replaced by Brahmanical temples. Excavations also revealed the ruins of the Parameshwara temple from the early Chalukyan period. Nearby, at Sankaram, rock-cut cells with Buddha figures were discovered, highlighting its importance as a monastic site.

Eastern Chalukyas, or Chalukyas of Vengi was a South Indian dynasty whose kingdom was located in present-day Andhra Pradesh. Their capital was Vengi and their dynasty lasted for around 500 years, from the 7th century until c. 1130 C.E. when the Vengi kingdom merged with the Chola empire. The Vengi kingdom continued to be ruled by Eastern Chalukyan kings under the protection of the Chola empire until 1189 C.E., when the kingdom succumbed to the Hoysalas and the Yadavas. Their capital was originally at present day Vengi (Pedavegi) of the West Godavari district but was later changed to Rajamahendravaram (Rajamundry).

== Economy ==
National Palm Oil Research Centre is located in Pedavegi.

== Demographics ==
As of 2011 Census of India, Pedavegi had a population of 11846. The total population consists of 6033 males and 5813 females with a sex ratio of 964 females per 1000 males. There are 1243 children in the age group of 0–6 years old. The average literacy rate stands at 71.18%.

== See also ==
- Eluru district
