= Vishnukundina dynasty =

Indian dynasty based in Deccan

- 420–624
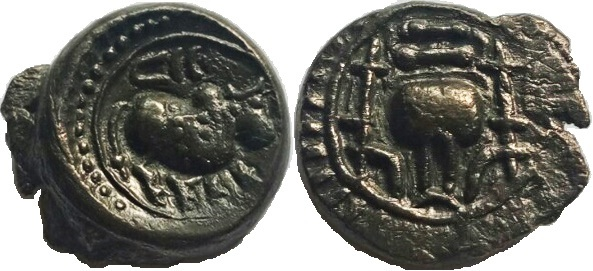
- Vishnukundina Empire, 420–674 AD, cast copper, 4.65g, Vidarbha (Maharashtra), Bull type.

- The Vishnukundinas and neighbouring South Asian polities c. 500 CE.
- Capital: Denduluru; Amaravati
- Common languages: Sanskrit
- Religion: Hinduism; Jainism
- Government: Monarchy
- Janasraya
- Historical era: Classical India
  - Established: 420
  - Disestablished: 624
Preceded by	Succeeded by
Vakataka dynasty	Eastern Chalukyas; Pallava Dynasty

The Vishnukundina dynasty (IAST: Vishnukundina, sometimes vishnukindin) was an Indian dynasty that ruled over parts of present-day Andhra Pradesh, Telangana, Maharashtra, Odisha and other parts of southern India between the 5th and 7th centuries. They emerged as an independent power during the reign of Madhava Varma, starting from indrapalagutta ( near modern nalgonda district) and later conquered coastal Andhra from the Salankayanas and established their capital at Denduluru near Eluru. Their rule significantly shaped the history of the Deccan region. However, their reign ended with the conquest of eastern Deccan by the Chalukya king Pulakeshin II, who appointed his brother, Kubja Vishnuvardhana, as viceroy. Vishnuvardhana later declared independence, founding the Eastern Chalukya dynasty.

== Etymology ==
The dynasty is usually referred to as the Viṣṇukuṇḍins, but the question was reviewed by S. Sankaranarayanan who closely examined the philogical evidence and concluded that Vishṇukuṇḍi was the grammatically correct form of the name. Although this is technically correct, historians continue to use Viṣukuṇḍin because it is well established in the literature, having been used by K. A. Nilakanta Sastri and Dineshchandra Sircar.

== Origin ==
The early rulers of the dynasty migrated from eastern Deccan to the west Deccan in search of employment and under the Vakatakas they might have attained feudatory status.

During the reign of Madhava Varma, they became independent and conquered coastal Andhra from the Salankayanas and established their capital at Denduluru near Eluru, West Godavari district. Some modern historians from Telangana suggest that the dynasty initially ruled from Indrapalanagara (in present-day Nalgonda district of Telangana), and later shifted to Denduluru, and Amaravathi.

== Chronology ==
The Vishnukundina reign might be fixed between the end of the Salankayana and the rise of the Eastern Chalukyan power in 624. Some historians mention Vishnukundinas' reign was from 420 to 624, while some other historians say their reign was from the early 5th century to the 7th century.

=== Govinda Varma I ===
Govinda Varma I took the princely title of Maharaja and his son Madhava Varma I was the founder of the power based on grants from Sriparvata (Nagarjunakonda) and Indrapalagutta.

=== Madhava Varma I ===
The reign of Madhava Varma (c. 420 – c. 455). He was the founder of the Vishnukundina power.

=== Madhava Varma II ===
Madhava Varma II (c. 440 – c. 460) was the most powerful ruler of Vishnukundina dynasty and his reign was its golden age. Under him the dynasty reached its greatest territorial extent. He married Vakataka Mahadevi, who was the mother of his son Vikramendra Varma I. She may have been the daughter of Prithvishena II, who Madhava Varma II married after defeating her father. Alternatively, she may have been the daughter or granddaughter of Harisena, married during the height of the latter's rule.

By the middle of the 5th century, the Vishnukundina dynasty rose to imperial heights. A princess of the then powerful ruling family of the Deccan the Vakatakas was given in marriage to Madhava Varma's son, Vikramendra Varma.

This alliance enabled them to extend their influence to the east coast and vanquish the petty chieftains lingering on in that area. Madhava Varma II led his arms against Ananda Gotrikas who were ruling over Guntur, Tenali and Ongole, probably enjoying subordinate position under the Pallavas of Kanchipuram.

After occupying these areas from the Ananda Gotrikas, Madhava Varma II made Amarapura (modern Amaravati) his capital. Keeping in view the constant threat from the Pallavas, he created an outpost to check their activities and appointed his son, Deva Varma and after his death the grandson Madhava Varma III as its Viceroy.

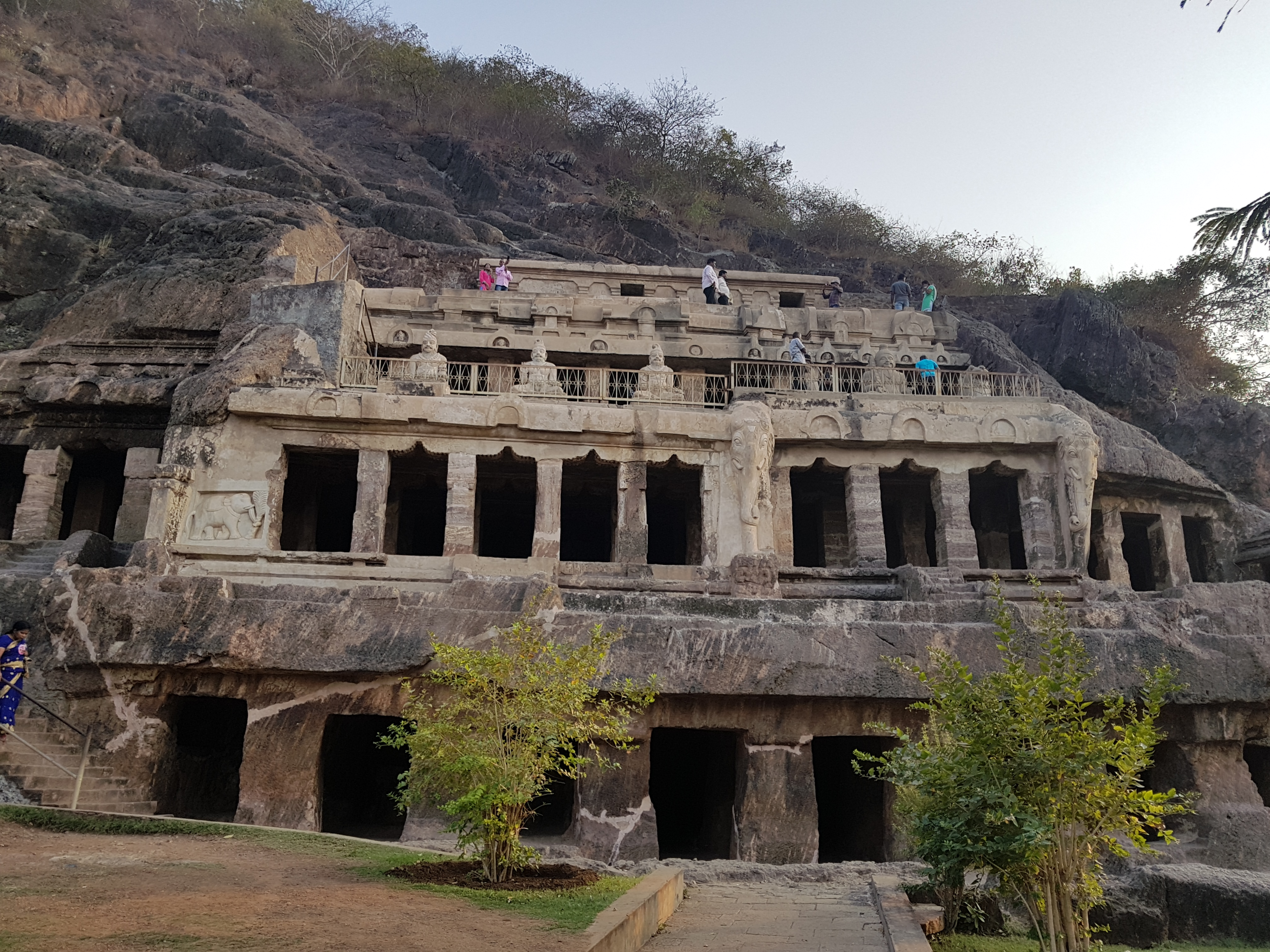
Undavalli Caves, Vijayawada, Guntur, Andhra Pradesh

Madhava Varma II next turned his attention against the Vengi kingdom which was under the Salankayanas. The Vengi region was annexed. The Godavari tract became part of the Vishnukundina territory. After these conquests the capital might have been shifted to Bezwada (Vijayawada), a more central location than Amarapura. These extensive conquests made him the lord of Dakshinapatha (southern country). After these various conquests Madhava Varma performed many Asvamedha, Rajasuya and other Vedic sacrifices.

=== Successors of Madhava Varma II ===
The fortunes of the Vishnukundinas were at a low point during the reign of the next ruler Vikramendra Varma I (508–528). The next two and half decades also experienced the constant strife and dynastic struggles during the reign of Indra Bhattaraka Varma (528–555). Though Indra Bhattaraka could not withstand the hostile Kalinga subordinate, Indra Varma and lost his life in battle. The Vishnukundinas lost their Kalinga possessions north of the Godavari.

=== Vikramendra Varma II ===
With the accession of Vikramendra Varma II (555–569), the fortunes of the Vishnukundina family were restored. To have immediate access to the Kalinga region, he shifted his capital from Bezwada to Lenduluru (modem Denduluru in the West Godavari district). He repulsed the attack of the Pallava ruler Simhavarman. He was successful enough to restore the fortunes of the Vishnukundinas in the Kalinga region. His son Govinda Varma II enjoyed a comparatively short period of rule (569–573).

=== Janassraya Madhava Varma IV ===
The Vishnukundina empire set about again to imperial expansion and cultural prosperity under its able ruler Janassraya Madhava Varma IV (573–621). This prudent king spent his early years of rule in consolidating his position in Vengi. The later part of his reign is marked by wars and annexations. In his 37th regnal year, he suppressed the revolt of his subordinate chief the Durjaya Pruthvi Maharaja in Guddadivishya (modern Ramachandrapuram in the East Godavari district).

Madhava Varma IV had to face the Chalukyan onslaught in his last years of rule. By about 616, Pulakeshin II and his brother Kubja Vishnuvardhana conquered Vengi from the Vishnukundinas and the Pithapuram area from their subordinate Durjayas. In 621 in his 48th regnal year, Madhava crossed the Godavari probably to oust the Chalukyas from his territories. However, he lost his life on the battlefield. His son Manchana Bhattaraka also might have been expelled by the Chalukyas. Thus the Vishnukundina rule was brought to a close by 624.

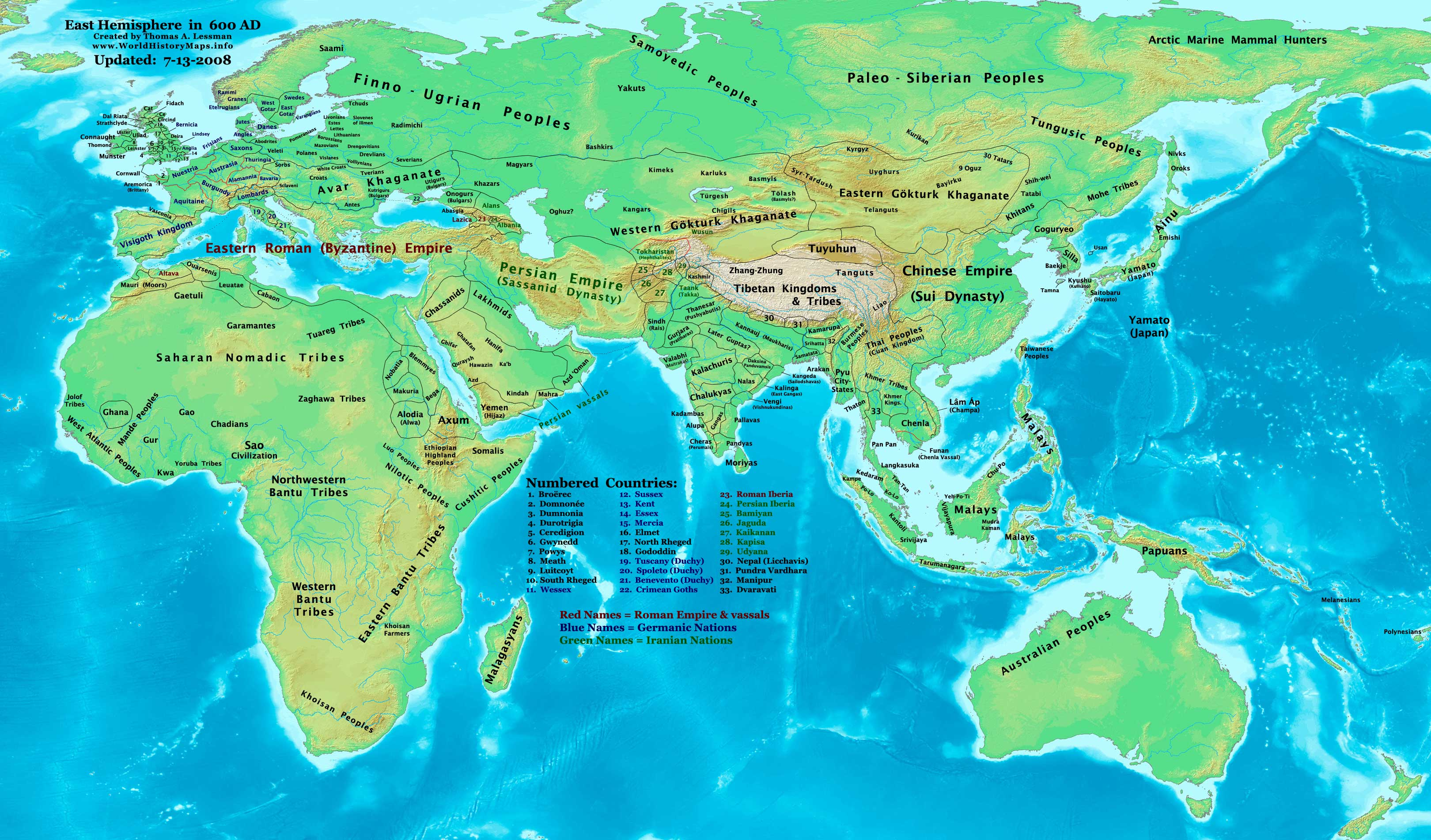
Greatly reduced Vishnukundina territory in 600 AD, along with the Chalukyas advancing at their border

== Vishnukundina country ==
They had three important cities, Indrapalanagara, Denduluru, and Amaravati.

== Administration ==
For administrative convenience, the empire was divided into a number of Rashtras and Vishayas. Inscriptions refer to Palki Rashtra, Karma Rashtra, Guddadi Vishaya, etc.

Madhava Varma III appointed members of the royal family as Viceroys for various areas of the kingdom.

The king was the highest court of appeal in the administrator of justice. The Vishnukundina rulers established various kinds of punishments for various crimes. They were known for their impartial judgment and high sense of justice.

=== Army ===
Their army consisted of traditional fourfold divisions:

- Elephants
- Chariots
- Cavalry
- Infantry

The Hastikosa was the officer-in-charge of elephant forces and the Virakosa was the officer-in-charge of land forces. These officers also issued grants on behalf of their monarchs.

=== Taxes ===
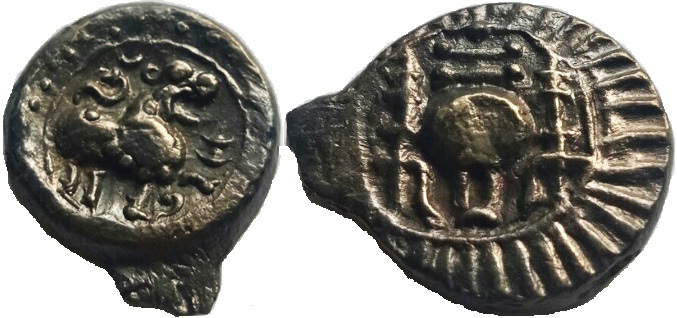
Vishnukundina Empire, 420–674 AD, Cast Copper, 7.80g, Vidarbha (Maharashtra), Lion type.

There may have been well-organized administrative machinery for the collection of land revenue. Agrahara villages enjoyed tax exemptions. Sixteen types of coins of the Vishnukundina rulers have been found by archaeologists.

== Religion ==
All the records of the Vishnukundinas and the kings prior to the Madhava Varma II seem to be patrons of Hinduism.

From the time of the accession of Madhava Varma II, an aggressive self-assertion of the Vedic Hinduism occurred. Elaborate Vedic ceremonies like Rajasuya, Sarvamedha, and Aswamedha were undertaken. The celebration of all these sacrifices represents the traditional spirit of the Brahmanical revival. Some of the rulers referred to themselves as 'Parama Mahesvaras'. The inscriptions refer to their family deity Sri Parvata Swami.

The names of rulers like Madhava Varma and Govinda Varma show their Vaishnavite leanings. Thus both the Hindu sects of Saivism and Vaishnavism might have received equal patronage from them.

== Literature ==
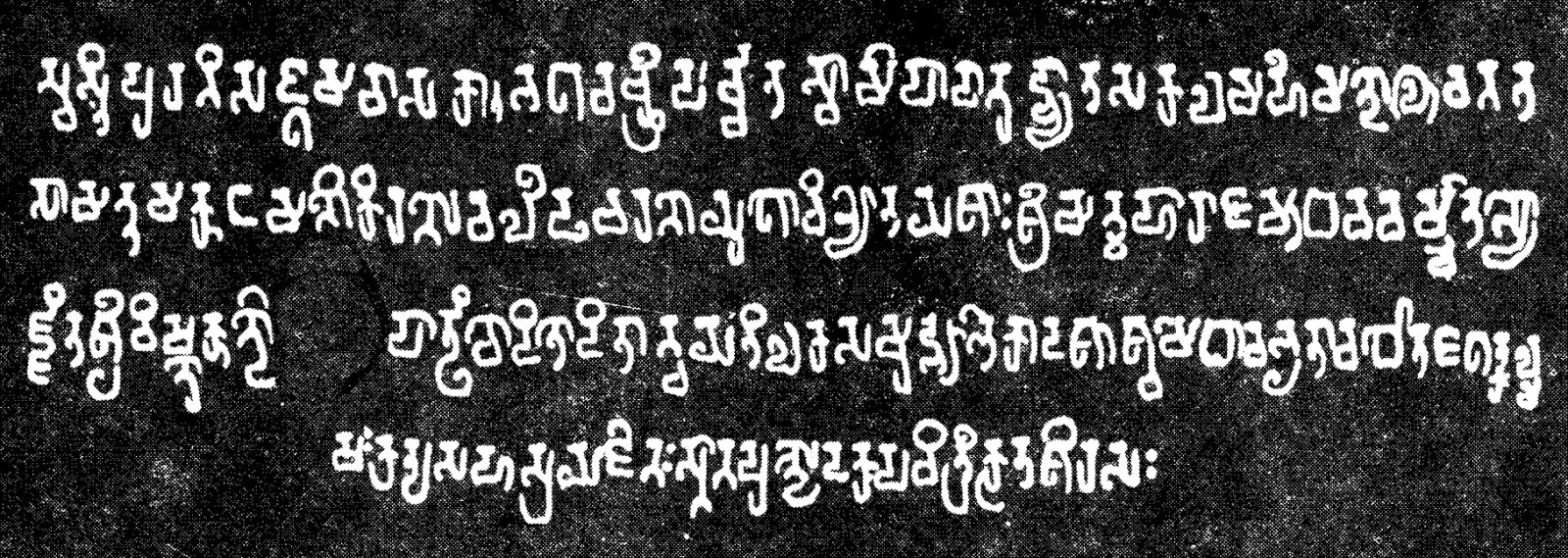
Old Telugu Script – Vishnukundina Indra Varma Sasanam 6th century

The Vishnukundinas were also great patrons of learning. They established colleges for Vedic learning. Learned Brahmins were encouraged by gifts of lands and colleges were established for the propagation of Vedic studies. Indra Bhattaraka established many schools for imparting education on Vedic literature. The performance of several elaborate Vedic ceremonies by Madhava Varma is evidence of the faith of the rulers in Vedic Hinduism and the popularity of Vedic learning with the people during this period.

Some of the Vishnukundina kings were credited with authorship of several books. Vikramendra Varma I was described as Mahakavi – a great poet in a record. Further, an incomplete work on Sanskrit poetics called 'Janasraya Chando Vichiti' was attributed to Madhava Varma IV who bore the title of 'Janasraya'. Sanskrit enjoyed royal patronage.

== Art and Architecture ==
Being great devotees of Siva, the Vishnukundinas seem to have been responsible for the construction of a number of cave temples dedicated to Siva. The cave structures at Bezwada (Vijayawada), Mogalrajapuram, Undavalli caves, and Bhairavakonda were dated to this period. Though some of these cave temples were attributed to the Pallava Mahendra Varman I, the emblems found on the caves and the areas being under the rule of the Vishnukundinas during this period clearly show that these were contributions of the Vishnukundinas. The big four-storeyed cave at Undavalli and the 8 cave temples in Bhairavakonda in Nellore district show however clear resemblances with the architecture of Pallava Mahendra Varman's period.

== See also ==
- Vakataka
- Salankayana
- Eastern Chalukya
- History of India

Timeline and cultural period	Indus plain (Punjab-Sapta Sindhu-Gujarat)	Gangetic Plain			Central India	Southern India
Timeline and cultural period	Indus plain (Punjab-Sapta Sindhu-Gujarat)	Upper Gangetic Plain (Ganga-Yamuna doab)	Middle Gangetic Plain	Lower Gangetic Plain	Central India	Southern India
IRON AGE
Culture	Late Vedic Period	Late Vedic Period; Painted Grey Ware culture	Late Vedic Period; Northern Black Polished Ware		Pre-history	
6th century BCE	Gandhara	Kuru-Panchala	Magadha		Adivasi (tribes)	Assaka
Culture	Persian-Greek influences	"Second Urbanisation"; Rise of Shramana movements Jainism - Buddhism - Ājīvika - Yoga			Pre-history	
5th century BCE	(Persian conquests)		Shaishunaga dynasty		Adivasi (tribes)	Assaka
4th century BCE	(Greek conquests)	Nanda empire				
HISTORICAL AGE
Culture	Spread of Buddhism				Pre-history	
3rd century BCE	Maurya Empire					Satavahana dynasty Sangam period (300 BCE – 200 CE); Early Cholas; Early Pandyan kingdom Cheras
Culture	Preclassical Hinduism (Note: Michaels (2004) p.39) - "Hindu Synthesis" (Note: Hiltebeitel (2002)) (ca. 200 BCE - 300 CE) (Note: Michaels (2004) p.39) (Note: Hiltebeitel (2002)); Epics - Puranas - Ramayana - Mahabharata - Bhagavad Gita - Brahma Sutras - Smarta Tradition; Mahayana Buddhism					
2nd century BCE	Indo-Greek Kingdom		Shunga Empire; Maha-Meghavahana Dynasty			Satavahana dynasty Sangam period (300 BCE – 200 CE); Early Cholas; Early Pandyan kingdom Cheras
1st century BCE	Indo-Greek Kingdom		Shunga Empire; Maha-Meghavahana Dynasty			Satavahana dynasty Sangam period (300 BCE – 200 CE); Early Cholas; Early Pandyan kingdom Cheras
1st century CE	Indo-Scythians; Indo-Parthians		Kuninda Kingdom			Satavahana dynasty Sangam period (300 BCE – 200 CE); Early Cholas; Early Pandyan kingdom Cheras
2nd century	Kushan Empire					Satavahana dynasty Sangam period (300 BCE – 200 CE); Early Cholas; Early Pandyan kingdom Cheras
3rd century	Kushano-Sasanian Kingdom; Western Satraps	Kushan Empire		Kamarupa kingdom	Adivasi (tribes)	Satavahana dynasty Sangam period (300 BCE – 200 CE); Early Cholas; Early Pandyan kingdom Cheras
Culture	"Golden Age of Hinduism"(ca. CE 320-650) (Note: Michaels (2004) p.40); Puranas - Kural; Co-existence of Hinduism and Buddhism					
4th century	Kidarites	Gupta Empire; Varman dynasty				Andhra Ikshvakus; Kalabhra dynasty Kadamba Dynasty; Western Ganga Dynasty
5th century	Hephthalite Empire	Alchon Huns				Vishnukundina; Kalabhra dynasty
6th century	Nezak Huns; Kabul Shahi; Maitraka				Adivasi (tribes)	Vishnukundina; Badami Chalukyas; Kalabhra dynasty
Culture	Late-Classical Hinduism (ca. CE 650-1100) (Note: Michaels (2004) p.41); Advaita Vedanta - Tantra; Decline of Buddhism in India					
7th century	Indo-Sassanids		Vakataka dynasty Empire of Harsha	Mlechchha dynasty	Adivasi (tribes)	Badami Chalukyas; Eastern Chalukyas; Pandyan kingdom (revival); Pallava
7th century	Karkota dynasty				Adivasi (tribes)	
8th century	Kabul Shahi	Pala Empire			Adivasi (tribes)	Eastern Chalukyas; Pandyan kingdom Kalachuri
9th century	Gurjara-Pratihara				Adivasi (tribes)	Rashtrakuta Empire; Eastern Chalukyas; Pandyan kingdom Medieval Cholas; Chera Perumals of Makkotai
10th century	Ghaznavids			Pala dynasty Kamboja-Pala dynasty	Adivasi (tribes)	Kalyani Chalukyas; Eastern Chalukyas; Medieval Cholas; Chera Perumals of Makkotai; Rashtrakuta
References and sources for table References Sources: Flood, Gavin D. (1996), An Introduction to Hinduism, Cambridge University Press; Hiltebeitel, Alf (2002), Hinduism. In: Joseph Kitagawa, "The Religious Traditions of Asia: Religion, History, and Culture", Routledge; Michaels, Axel (2004), Hinduism. Past and present, Princeton, New Jersey: Princeton University Press
