= Dindori, Maharashtra =

Dindori Dindorvan
- Town
- Location in Maharashtra, India
- Coordinates: 20°12′00″N 73°49′59″E
- Country: India
- State: Maharashtra
- District: Nashik

Government
  - Type: Municipal Council
  - Body: Dindori Municipal Council

Languages
  - Official: Marathi
- Time zone: UTC+5:30 (IST)
- PIN: 422202
- Telephone code: 02557
- ISO 3166 code: IN-MH
- Vehicle registration: MH-15
- Nearest city: Nashik
- Vidhan Sabha constituency: Dindori
- Lok Sabha constituency: Dindori

Dindori is a town and taluka in Nashik district in the Indian state of Maharashtra.

Dindori is known for its grape farming. Dindori is also the center for spirituality by " Shree Swami Samarth Seva Marg (Dindori Pranit)" which was established by Shree Sadguru Pithale Maharaj. After Sadguru Pithale Maharaj's Mahanirvana, Sadguru P.P.Moredada brought the Swami Darbar to his farm at Dindori and initiated Swami Seva from there. It has since been known as the Dindori Darbar. After Sadguru Moredada's Mahanirvana, Gurumauli P.P.Annasaheb More carried forward legacy of Dindori affiliated Shree Swami Samarth Sevamarg. He laid foundation of Akhil Bharatiya Shree Swami Samarth Gurupeeth, Trimbakeshwar, a charitable trust to offer platform to world for healthy, happy and peaceful life.

== Culture ==
The "Tulja Bhawani Temple" is located on the Nehya Mountain.

Nearest places

1. Gadhicha Ganpati: It's a historical temple of lord Ganesh. This temple was established by madhavrao peshve. It is a powerful/Jagrut Ganesh mandir.
2. Kille Ramsej: Ramsej or Ramshej Fort is a small fort located 10 kilometres (6.2 mi) from dindori, in the Indian state of Maharashtra.

Ramsej fort saw the war against Mughal Empire for six and a half years. The first killedar (leader) was Suryaji Jadhav, but after five and a half years he was transferred and a new killedar was appointed. Mughals conquered Ramshej Fort by paying bribe to the new killedar.

1. Shree Kshetra Kardamashram (Karanji): Shree Kshetra Kardamashram is about 10 km from Dindori, 6 km near from ozerkhed dam. Shree Kshetra Kardamashram is place of parents mata anusuya (Ajol of Dattatraya). Bhagvan Shree Nrusihsarasvati done here 12 years tapatchcharya(Penance). Shree Kshetra Kardamashram also known as Prati-Gangapur.
2. Shree Kongai Mata: Kongai mata mandir is temple Mata Bhavani which is established by Shivaji at the time of surat lut (plunder).
3. Shree Vindyavasini Mata: It is a temple of mata Renuka. It is a very old temple vindyavasini mata.
4. Rantal: is a historical place of warin between Shivaji Raje & mughal at the time of surat lut.
5. Shree Rameshvar Mandir: It is an oldest temple of lord Shiva, which is established by lord Rama at the time of 14 years vanvas.
6. Shree Saptshrungi mata: Its A Ardh-shaktipith of mata durga. It is an about 55 km from Dindori.
7. Shree Swami Samarth Pradhan Seva Kendra, Dindori - Spiritual Counseling towards Each problem of life [ free of charge ].

Head :Gurumauli P.P.Annasaheb More
