= List of mountain peaks of Maharashtra =

Maharashtra has an extensive mountain range running parallel to its 750 km long coastline. This range is geographically part of the Sahyadris or the Western Ghats which forms a crest along the western edge. of the Deccan Plateau separating it from the coastal Konkan belt. Throughout its extent it bears some renowned peaks, hill stations and valleys. Parts of the western ghats has been designated as the Hottest Biodiversity Hotspots.

== List of mountain peaks ==
Following is the list of some notable peaks:

(This list is highly inaccurate in terms of ranks)

Rank	Photo	Name	Elevation in meters	Mountain Range	District	Significance
1		Kalsubai	1,646	Kalsubai Range	Ahilyanagar	Highest point in Maharashtra.
2		Salher	1,567	Selbari Range	Nasik	Highest fort in Sahyadris and the 2nd highest peak in Maharashtra.
3		Gawaldev	1,322	Malsej Range	Ahilyanagar	Peak between Ghanchakkar and Katrabai top
4		Ghanchakkar	1,532	Malsej Range	Ahilyanagar	4th highest mountain of Maharashtra
5		Alang Fort	1478	Kalsubai Range	Nashik	One of the tough fort in maharashtra.
6		Dhodap	1472	Satmala Range	Nasik	2nd highest peak in Nashik.
7		Mahableshwar	1439	Satara Range	Satara	Tourist attraction for Cool environment in summer days.
8		Taramati	1,431	Malshej Range	Ahilyanagar	This is one of two peaks on Harishchandragad.
9		Harishchandragad	1,424	Sahyadri Range	Ahilyanagar	A popular trekking destination with ruined fortifications and ancient caves tracing back to the Microlithic age.
10		Saptashrungi	1,416	Satmala Range	Nasik	It is a site of Hindu pilgrimage.
11		Torna	1,404	Pune Range	Pune	It is the first fort captured by Chhatrapati Shivaji Maharaj in 1643.
12		Purandar	1,387	Pune Range	Pune	It is the birthplace of Sambhaji Raje Bhosale son of Shivaji shares 9th position padargad from raigadh district near Karjat height 4490 ft ,1389 m
13		Rajgad	1,376	Pune Range	Pune	Formerly known as Murumdev, it was capital of the Maratha Empire during the rule of Shivaji for almost 26 years, after which he moved the capital to Raigad.
14		Mangi-Tungi	1,331	Selbari Range	Nasik	Only twin-pinnacled peak with plateau in between.
15		Sinhagad	1,302	Pune Range	Pune	Location of the renowned Battle of Sinhagad.
16		Ratangad	1,297	Malshej Range	Ahilyanagar	2nd highest peak in Ahilyanagar.
17		Brahmagiri	1,295	Trimbakeshwar Range	Nasik	Site of origin of the sacred Godavari River is near Trimbak.
18		Anjaneri	1,280	Trimbakeshwar Range	Nasik	According to Hindu scriptures, it is the birthplace of Lord Hanuman and thus is named after his mother.
19		Pratapgad	1,080	Satara Range	Satara	Significant as the site of the Battle of Pratapgad, the fort is now a popular tourist destination.
20		Raigad	820	Pune Range	Raigad	Served as the capital to former Maratha Kingdom ruler Shivaji in 1674.
