= Geography of Nashik District =

Nashik District, a district in Maharashtra, India, is noted for the mountains and hills occupying the north and north-east of its territory. These hill ranges are eastward spurs of the Western Ghats and form prominent landmarks in the district, some noted for the shrines they harbor while others for the trekking adventures which can be undertaken while ascending the peaks. Broadly categorized, the hills can be segregated into 3 noteworthy ranges:

- Selbari Range which may be inclusive of the Dholbari range, alternately called Selbari-Dholbari range.
- Satmala Range also called the Satmala-Ajanta range.
- Trimbakeshwar Range constituting the Trimbak-Anjaneri hills.

== Selbari-Dolbari Range ==
Selbari is a mountain range located at the northernmost extent of Nashik District forming a natural boundary between it and Dhule District.Most part of the range lies to the north of the Mausam River along an east to west axis turning around in a loop coming to lie south of the river to continue along in a west to east fashion. The southern part of the range is at times identified as a unique range called Dholbari. Alternatively, the range is referred to as the Selbari-Dolbari range. The highest peak in the range, Salher (1,567m) also happens to the 2nd highest peak in Maharashtra and is significant for being the highest fort in the Western Ghats.

== Satmala Range ==
Satmala is a mountain range which runs across Nashik District, Maharashtra. They are an integral part of the Sahyadris range within Nashik. These peaks are visible from a greater part of the district and form prominent landmarks. The highest of them is Dhodap (1,451 metres). Dhodap hill is third highest hill peak in Maharashtra after Kalsubai and Salher and 29th highest peak in Western Ghats. At the eastern side of this range lies the Chanvad range.

== Trimbakeshwar ==
It lies south of the city of Nashik and is significant for the Trimbakeshwar Shiva Temple located near the range. The northern face of the range is the birthplace of India's 2nd longest river Godavari. The southern face of these hills are covered with dense forests and thus form a catchment area for the Upper Vaitarna Reservoir, the most important and reliable source of potable water supply to the metropolitan city of Mumbai. Brahmagiri (1,295meters) is the tallest peak in this range followed by Anjaneri peak(1,280meters).

== List of peaks in Nashik ==
Name	Elevation in meters !
[[none of these (hill), Maharashtra|Brahmagiri]]	1,295
Anjaneri	1,280
Harihar	1,120
Bhaskargad	1,086
Tringalwadi	987
Ghargad	962
Dhoria	926
Walavihir	916
Kavnai	914
Mangi-Tungi	1,331
Tambolya	1,078
Nhavi Killa	1280
Hanumantgad	1062
Der Kharak	1099
Salher	1,567
Takara	1,478
Mulher	1,317
Chauler	1,137
Galna	787
Dhodap	1472
Saptashrungi	1,264
