= Tryambaka =

Tryambaka may refer to:

- Shiva, a Hindu god also known by the epithet Tryambaka ("three-eyed")
  - "Tryambakam" or "Mahamrityunjaya Mantra", a mantra from the Rigveda
- Trimbak, a city in Maharashtra, India
- Trimbakeshwar Shiva Temple, Hindu temple in India
- Trimbakeshwar Range, mountain range in Maharashtra, India
- Trimbakeshwar tehsil, town in Maharashtra, India
- Tryambaka-yajvan (1655-1750), a Sanskrit writer from the Thanjavur Maratha kingdom
