= Selbari Range =

Mountain range in Maharashtra, India

- Location within Maharashtra

Highest point
- Elevation: 1,331 m (4,367 ft)
- Coordinates: 20°50′29.5″N 74°05′32.7″E

Geography
- District: Nasik
- Parent range: Western Ghats

Geology
- Mountain type: Flood basalt
- Rock type: Basalt

Selbari is a mountain range located in Nashik District in Maharashtra, India. Spanning east-west the hills form the northernmost extent of the Sahyadris and serve as a natural boundary between Nashik District and Dhule district. The range is gifted with a number of peaks including the only two-pinnacled peak of Mangi-Tungi rising to a considerable height of up to 1,331 meters.

Traditionally, the range is limited to the hills sprawling north of the Mausam River but extended definitions also include those south of the Mosam river which are connected to the former in a semi-circular loop. This shorter southern extension is known as the Dolbhari hills named after a village settlement around their base. To avoid disambiguity, sources refer to this agglomeration as the Selbari-Dholbari range.

== Geology ==
The mountain range was formed by the same historical events that gave birth to the Western Ghats. Resting on the Deccan Plateau geologically identified as a large igneous province, it consists of solidified Flood basalt dating back to the Cenozoic era.

== Geography ==
The peaks progressively lose altitude towards the east, with westernmost peaks being twice as tall as those at the eastern end. East of this hill is situated the Selbari pass facilitating road communication in the depression caused by the headward erosion across this range by the Salvar nala, a tributary of the Panjhra river of Dhule district. Further east are situated the Hindabari pass and Thermal fort. Near the eastern extremity of this range within the district is situated the Galna fort, which has given its name to this line of hills, commanding a pass route from south to north. The western edge falls gently to the Dang region in Gujarat.

== List of notable peaks ==
The Highest peak in the Selbari range (excluding Dholbari) is the Mangi-Tungi peak with its higher pinnacle Mangi rising up to 4360 feet. If one includes the Dholbari range then, the tallest peak would be Salher which is also the highest fort and the second highest peak in Maharashtra.

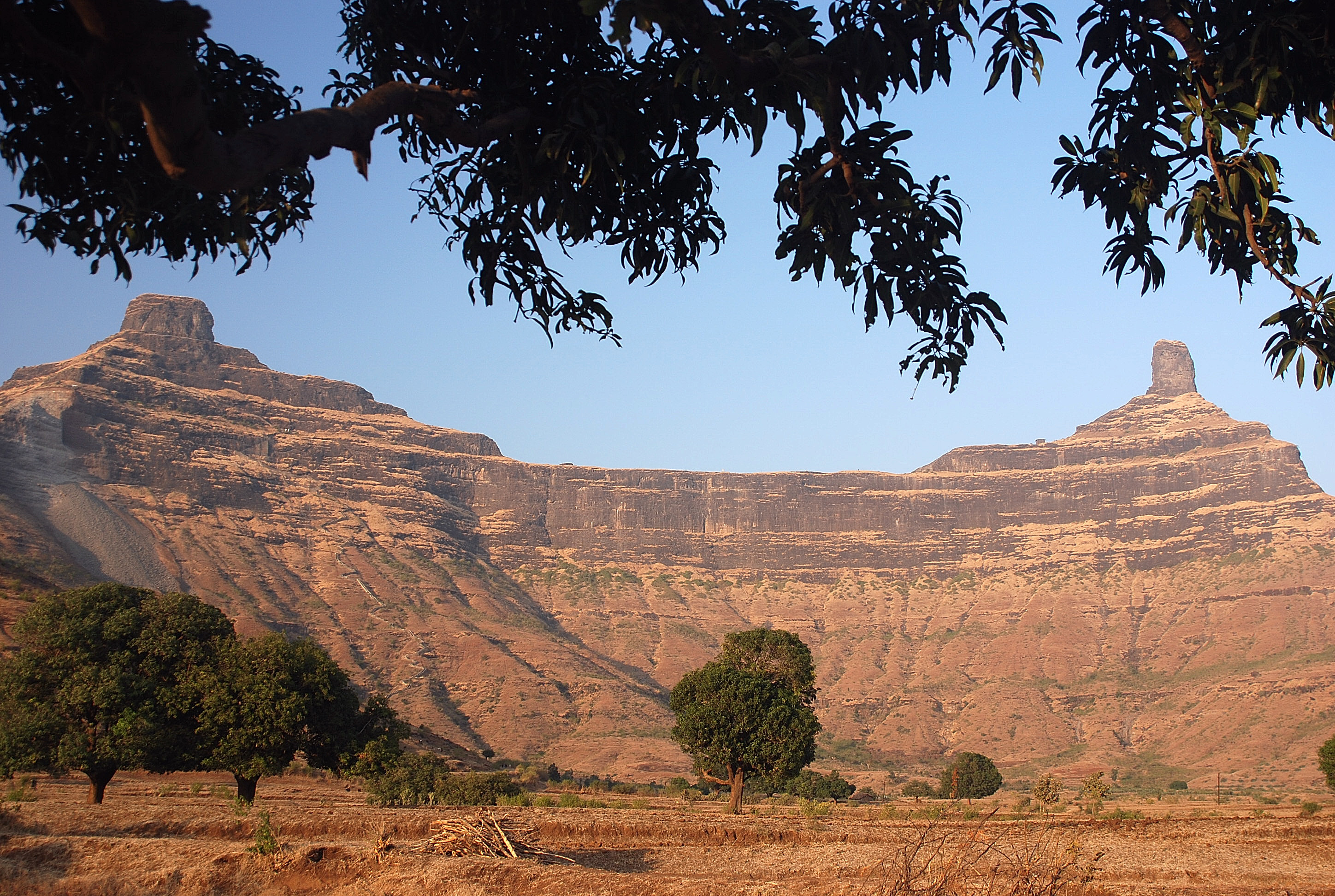
Mangi-Tungi

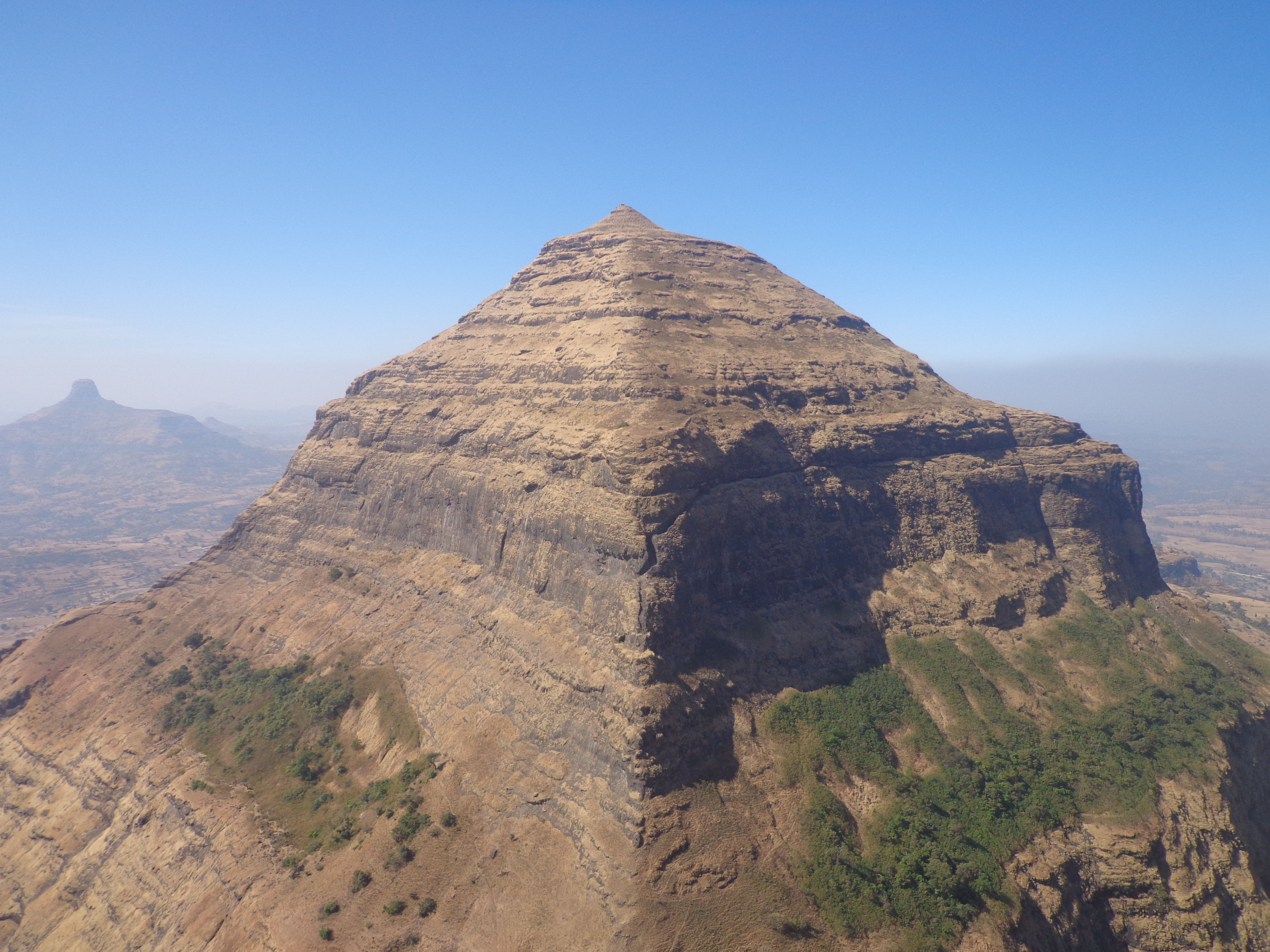
Salher

| Name | Elevation in meters |
|---|---|
| Mangi-Tungi | 1,331m |
| Tambolya | 1,078m |
| Nhavi Killa | 1280 |
| Hanumantgad | 1062 |
| Der Kharak | 1099 |

Additional peaks in the Silbari-Dholbari range:

| Name | Elevation in meters |
|---|---|
| Salher | 1,567m |
| Takara | 1,478m |
| Mulher | 1,317m |
| Chauler | 1,137m |
| Galna | 787m |

== See also ==
- Satmala Range
- List of mountain peaks of Maharashtra
