= Satmala Range =

Mountain range which runs across Nashik District, Maharashtra, India

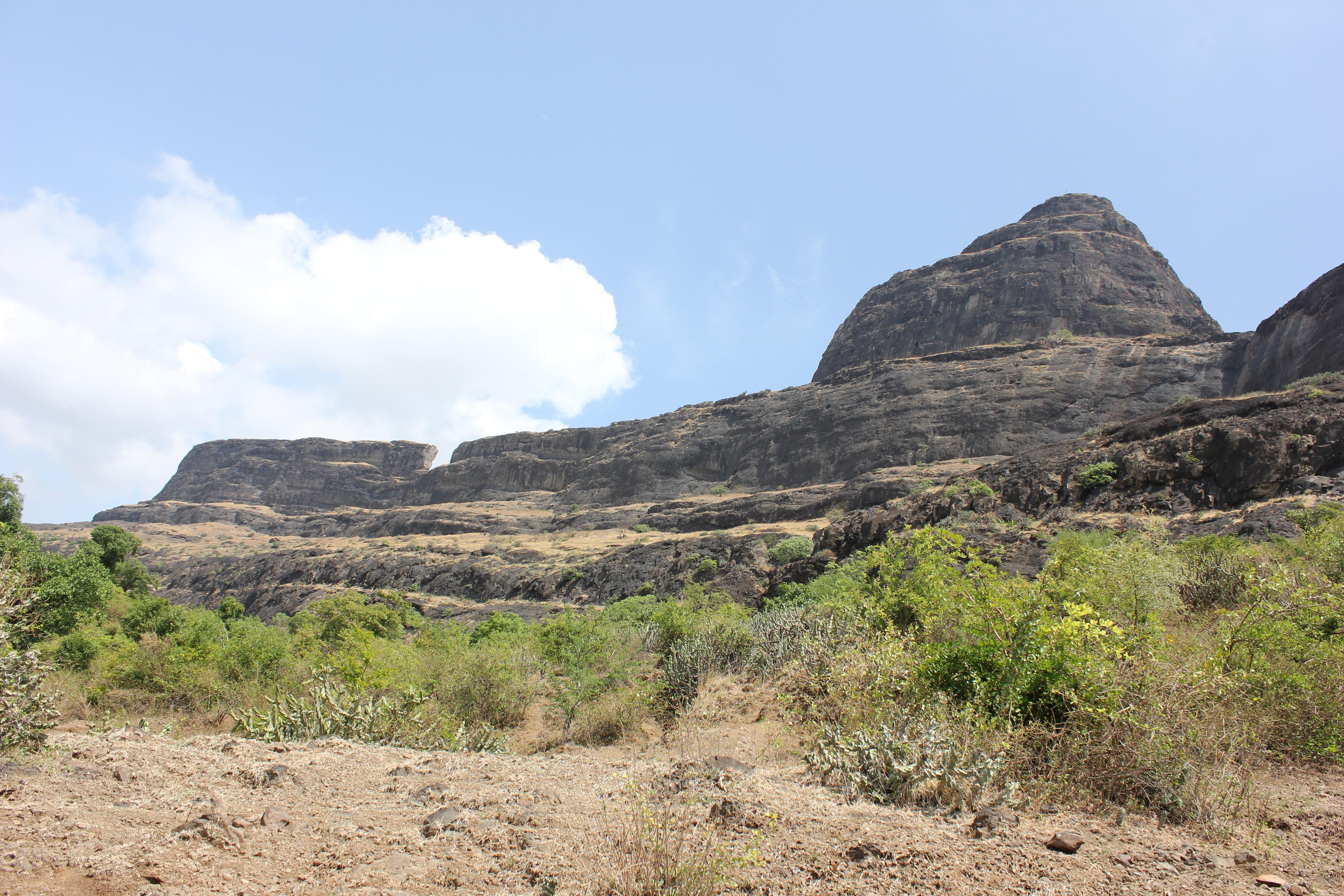
- Dhodap-One of the peaks

Highest point
- Elevation: 1,472 m (4,829 ft)
- Coordinates: 20°23′25″N 73°54′31″E

Geography
- Location within Maharashtra
- Location: Satamala Range
- Country: India
- State: Maharashtra
- District: Nashik
- Parent range: Western Ghats

Geology
- Mountain type: Flood basalt
- Rock type: Basalt

Satmala (pronunciation:[sɐtmaːla]) is a mountain range which runs across Nashik District, Maharashtra. They are an integral part of the Sahyadris range within Nashik. These peaks are visible from a greater part of the district and form prominent landmarks. The highest of them is Dhodap (1,451 metres). Dhodap hill is the third highest hill peak in Maharashtra after Kalsubai and Salher and 29th highest peak in the Western Ghats. At the eastern side of this range lies the Chandvad range. There is a range with the same name Satmala in Telangana.

The most important range of Nashik is the Satmala range. This range looks like a necklace placed along Nashik. It passes right through the center of the city. From Saputara to Vani, from Chandwad to Manmad is the spread of Satmala range.

There are in total 14 forts on Satmala range.

- On the way to Saputara from Nashik, lies Hatgad fort (3656 ft. form M.S.L) which is around 6–7 km before Saputara. This fort can be easily recognized from the road. The top is not very tall, but there are many historical remains of the fort seen even today.
- Moving towards Vani from Hatgad fort, one sees two forts standing next to each other. They are Achala (4062 ft. form M.S.L) and Ahivant (4024 ft. form M.S.L). The Pimpri-achala village on this route is the base village at Achala. The view from the top of Achala is outstanding with the Taula mountain on the south and Ahivant and Saptashrungi towards its east.
- The next fort is Ahivant which is seen towards the right side of the road, proceeding towards Nanduri. This fort can also be approached by a way from Achala. The spread of Ahivant is quite large.
- Adjoining it is Mohandari.
- Saptashrungigad (4659 ft. form M.S.L) is one of the famous religious destinations for Nashik. The fort right in front of Saptashrungi is Markandya (4370 ft. form M.S.L). Vehicles are available till the foothills of Markandya from Vani. Once in a year on an auspicious occasion thousands of devotees visit this fort.
- After this stands the twin fort of Rawlya Jawlya (4056 ft. form M.S.L). On a large plateau base are seen the twin fort standing tall. Kanhergad (3582 ft. form M.S.L) is at a convenient distance from here. One can reach here by catching a Kalvan bus from Nashik via Nanduri. This fort has marked its importance in history by the name of the brave Ramaji Pangera.
- Next is Dhodap (4769 ft. form M.S.L) which can be easily recognized due to its peculiar shape. Seeing the map of Nashik, one can easily identify Dhodap right at the center which is near the National highway at 7 km from Vadalibhoi. Dhodap is a fort rich in heritage with its fortification, bastions, caves and water tanks. It has all those important elements which would mark it an important fort in history.
- After Dhodap is the fort of Kanchana (3722 ft. form M.S.L) on the Satmala range. This fort is a thrilling trekking destination for those who love adventure.
- Koldher (3209 ft. form M.S.L), Rajdher (3579 ft. form M.S.L), Indrai (4495 ft. form M.S.L) and Chandwad (3611 ft. form M.S.L) are the important forts of Chandwad region. All these forts are at their best during the monsoons.
- The Satmala continues in Manmad with the Habdi pinnacle and the twin fort of Ankai-Tankai.
- Gorakhgad, Kanakgiri, Mesana and Katra are also of due importance.
- Satmala range further continues to Ajanta and this part is known as Ajanta range.

The best season for visiting the Satmala range is July to February. During March to June, the area becomes very dry due to extreme summers.

== List of Peaks ==
Photo	Name	Elevation in meters	District	Significance
	Dhodap	1472	Nasik	2nd highest peak in Nashik.
	Saptashrungi	1,264	Nasik	It is a site of Hindu pilgrimage.
