= Ghanchakkar =

Coordinates: 19.476°N 73.760°E

Ghanchakkar 1,532 metres (5,026 ft) is the third highest peak in the Maharashtra State under Sahyadri mountain ranges in western India. Its neighbouring peak Muda 1,520 metres (4,990 ft) is the fourth highest peak in the Maharashtra State under Sahyadris.

== Trekking ==
Ascents of the mountain are normally made from one of two base villages. Shirpunje village is located 22 kilometres (14 mi) from Rajur and is situated on the northern side of the mountain. Using this village as a start point, the peak of Ghanchakkar can be reached in around 2.5 hours. Alternatively climbers often use Kumshet village as a base and is around 33 kilometres (108,000 ft) from Rajur.

This village is used as a stopover resting place for those who trek from Ratangad to Harishchandragad via Katrabai. From Kumshet there is no direct approach to Ghanchakkar, trekkers have to climb up to the Kartabai col and from there bypass the Wakri mountain and proceed towards Muda. Then one must walk across the connecting col between Muda and Ghanchakkar to reach the Ghanchakkar's peak. Hence from Kumshet village, climbing Ghanchakkar using this route is indirect and long-winded, taking about 4 hours.

Being in a remote location, these mountains are hard to reach. Treks from Ratangad to Harishchandragad, may require descent into the Katrabai and then walk to Kumshet. Lack of adequate transport facilities such as public buses in this area, requires trekkers to rely on their private vehicles and Jeeps which operate between Rajur and Kumshet/Paachnai/Ambit

Bhairavgad fort near Shirpunje 1,145 metres (3,757 ft) village can be trekked if ample amount of time present. The photographs in this article are taken from the top of Bhairavgad near Shirpunje village.

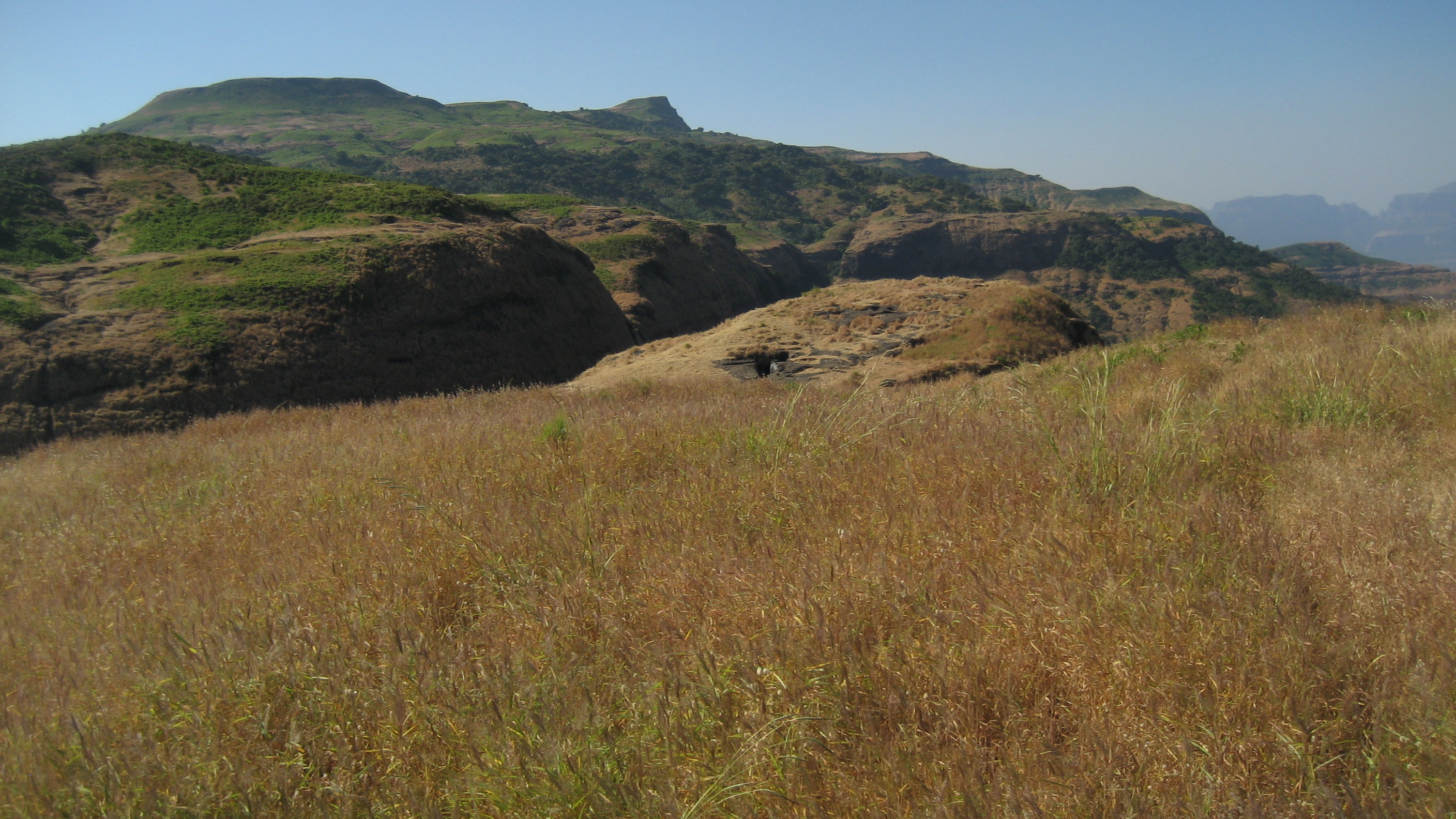
Ghanchakkar Plateau

== Topography ==
Ghanchakkar and Muda combinedly have a vast plateau between their summits.

Despite Ghanchakkar being the third highest peak in the Western Ghats, it is often overlooked by trekkers due to its lack of water. There is not an adequate supply of water apart from one small source which is only available during the colder months until summer at which point the plateau becomes barren. Ghanchakkar and Muda also do not offer any kind of shelter. There is a shrine of a local deity called 'Gavalidev' on Muda but it is mostly known only to the local people.
