= Trimbak =

Trimbak Trambak
- City
- Trambakehswar
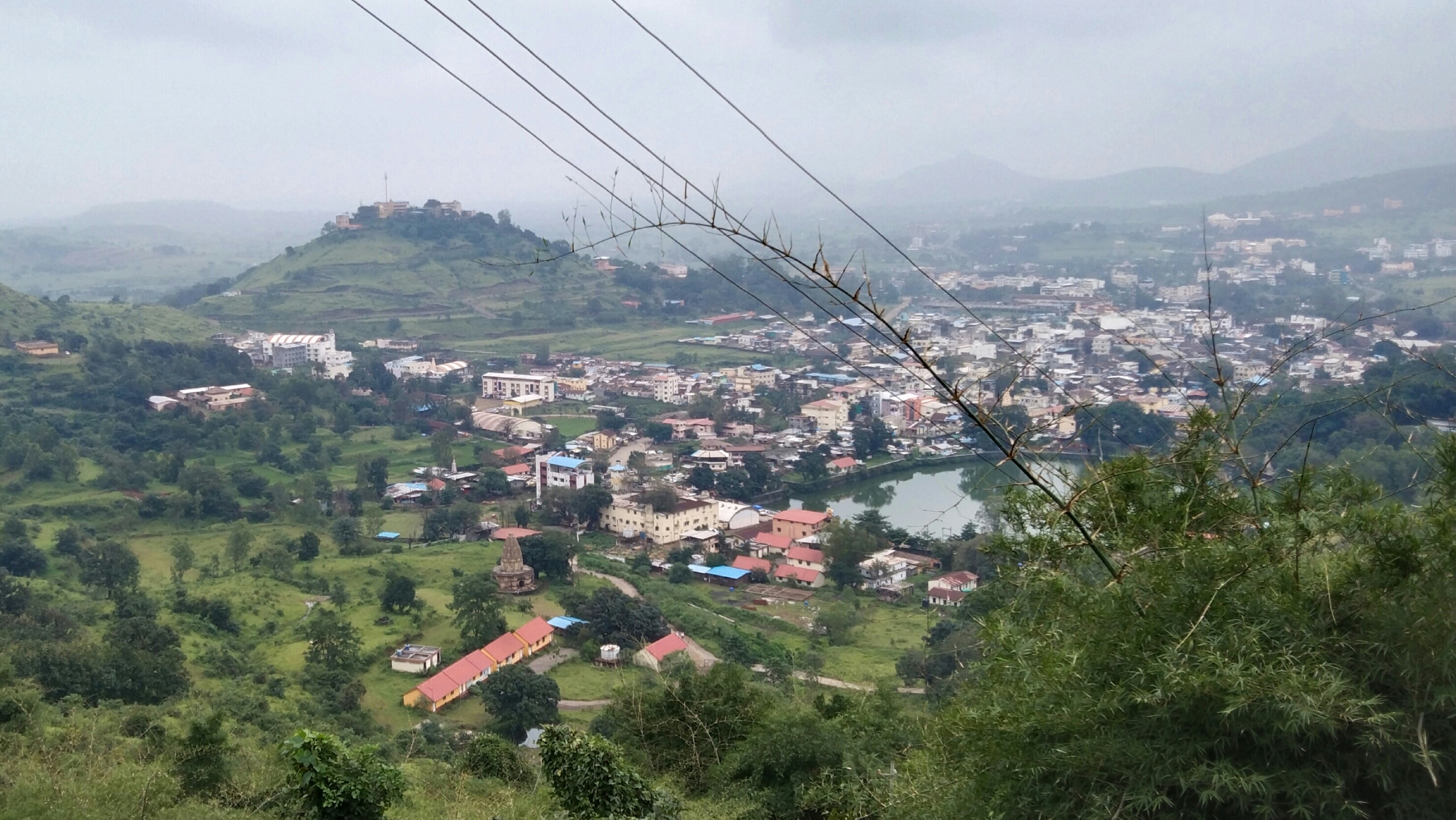
- Trimbak city as seen from the Brahmagiri hill

- Location in Maharashtra, India
- Coordinates: 19.93°N 73.53°E
- Country: India
- State: Maharashtra
- District: Nashik
- Named for: Trimbakeshwar Shiva Temple

Government
  - Type: Municipal Council
  - Body: Trimbak Municipal Council
- Elevation: 750 m (2,460 ft)

Population (2011)
  - Total: 12,056

Languages
  - Official: Marathi
- Time zone: UTC+5:30 (IST)
- Postal code: 422212
- Vehicle registration: MH-15

Trimbak (also known as Trimbakeshwar Trayambakēśvara) is a city and a municipal council in Nashik District in the Indian state of Maharashtra. The Trimbakeshwar Shiva Temple is located here, one of the twelve Jyotirlingas, where the Hindu genealogy registers at Trimbakeshwar, Maharashtra are kept. The origin of the sacred Godavari River is near Trimbak.

View of the ancient Trimbakeshwar Jyotirlinga Mandir in Trimbak.

The Simhastha Kumbh Mela in the Nashik district was originally held at Trimbak, but after 1789 clash between Vaishnavites and Saivites over precedence of bathing, the Maratha Peshwa shifted the Vaishnavites' bathing place to Ramkund in Nashik city. The Shaivites continue to regard Trimbak as the proper location of the Mela.

== Etymology ==
The name Trimbak is derived from the Sanskrit Tryambaka (tri = three + ambaka = eyes), an epithet of Lord Shiva referring to his third eye.

== Geography ==
=== Location and Topography ===
Trimbak is located at 19.56°N 73.32°E, and maintains an average elevation of around 720 meters (2,362 feet) above mean sea level. The town is nestled within the hilly terrain of the Trimbakeshwar Range, which forms a section of the Western Ghats.On the western side of the town lies the Brahmagiri Hill, the highest point in the immediate vicinity, reaching an elevation of 1,295 meters (4,248 feet). The range's geology is primarily composed of flood basalt and is part of the Deccan Traps region. Trimbak is accessible by road, located approximately 28-30 km from Nashik city and about 180 km from Mumbai.

=== Hydrology ===
Within the city, the sacred tank known as Kushavarta Kund is considered to be the point of origin for the Godavari River according to Hindu belief. Water emerging from the Brahmagiri Hill also serves as the source for the Vaitarna River, which flows south into the water catchment area for the Upper Vaitarna Reservoir. The Upper Vaitarna Reservoir is an important source of potable water supply for the metropolitan city of Mumbai, as the reservoir supplies 15.5% of Mumbai's water supply

== Demographics ==
As of 2011 India census, Trimbak had a population of 12,056. Males constitute 51% of the population and females 49%. Trimbak has an average effective literacy rate of 89.61%: male literacy is 94.12%, and female literacy is 84.88%. In Trimbak, 11.10% of the population is under 6 years of age.

== History ==
Trimbak has long been an important place of pilgrimage in Hinduism, as the tradition holds that the sage Gautama performed penance here, which led to the descent of the Godavari to cleanse his hermitage. It is also home to the Trimbakeshwar Shiva Temple, which is one of the 12 Jyotirlingas. In 1690, the Trimbakeshwar Temple was raided and destroyed by Aurungzeb's forces. Later, during Peshwar rule In the 18th century, the current Trimbakeshwar Temple was re-constructed by Balaji Baji Rao. At the same time, the town itself was developed to support the many pilgrims who came for worship and ritual functions.

=== British Occupation and Rule ===
Trimbak was historically protected by a fortress located on a steep hill. In April 1818, a British force led by Lt. Colonel McDowell laid siege to this stronghold. Over three days, beginning April 22nd, the British struggled to establish firing positions on the challenging terrain, facing heavy resistance that damaged their artillery. Despite the determined defense, the fortress surrendered on April 25th in exchange for favorable terms. This strategic victory secured the vital region north of Pune for the British.

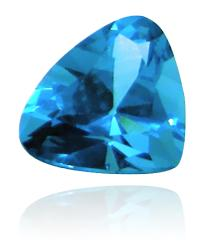
Neel Mani

During this siege, the agents of the Peshwa secretly removed the Neel Mani, or 'Blue Diamond' (now known as the Nassak Diamond), from its setting in the Trimbakeshwar Temple. The Peshwa later handed the gem to the British officer Colonel Briggs, who passed it to the Governor-General of India, the Earl of Moira. It was subsequently shipped to England, where it has remained a significant subject of controversy and attention.

Administratively, Trimbak was part of the Nashik district even during British colonial times. The boundaries and sub-divisions in the district saw periodic changes: for example, in 1869 Nashik was formalized as a full district, and more recently (in 1999) the Trimbakeshwar tehsil was formed by re-organizing parts of Nashik, Igatpuri, and Peint talukas.

== Bollywood In Trimbak ==
A scene in the movie "Khakee" was shot at Pahina village in Trimbakeshwar near Nashik. During the shoot of this scene Aishwarya Rai Bachan had a minor accident which was reported by the local news.
