= Dhodap =

- Hill Fort
- Location within Maharashtra
- Coordinates: 20°23′8.1″N 74°01′51.2″E
- Country: India
- State: Maharashtra
- District: Nashik
- Taluka: Chandwad
- Named for: Dhodambe
- Elevation: 1,472 m (4,829 ft)

Dhodap is one of the hill forts in Maharashtra state in India. Situated in Chandwad taluka in the Nashik district. Base village is Hatti. the fort is 4829 ft (1472 mt) above sea level. It is the site of the second-highest fort in the Sahyadri mountains after Salher. Dhodap hill is the third-highest peak in Maharashtra after Kalsubai and Salher and the 29th highest peak in Western Ghats.

== Location ==
The base village is called as Dhodambe from where one can start to climb the fort.

The fort is 55 km to the Nashik, about 3 km from Hatti Village, 16 km from Abhona in the Satmala range, Nasik region of Sahyadris.

When travelling from Nashik to Malegaon on highway NH-3, one can see this fort from a distance, from villages Shirwade-Wani, Khadak-Jamb, Vadali-bhoi and Sogras. One simple route is Nashik to Wadali bhoi (50 km) and Wadali bhoi to Dhodambe (8 km). This fort is also accessible from village Hanmantpada in Devla taluka (15 km) which has simple and easy access to the fort. The fort is recognizable for its typical shape.

== Parts of the fort ==
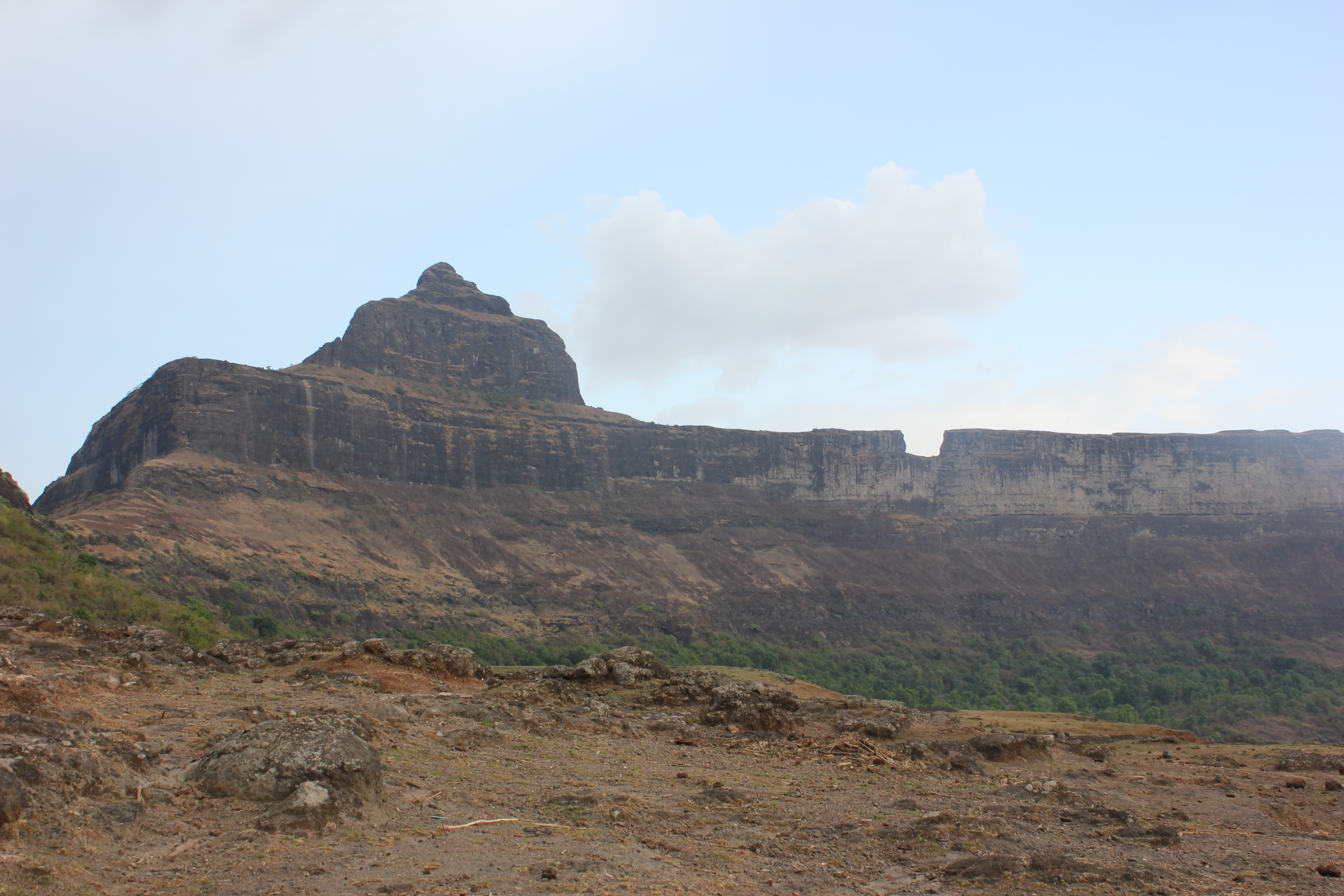
Dhodap from Otur

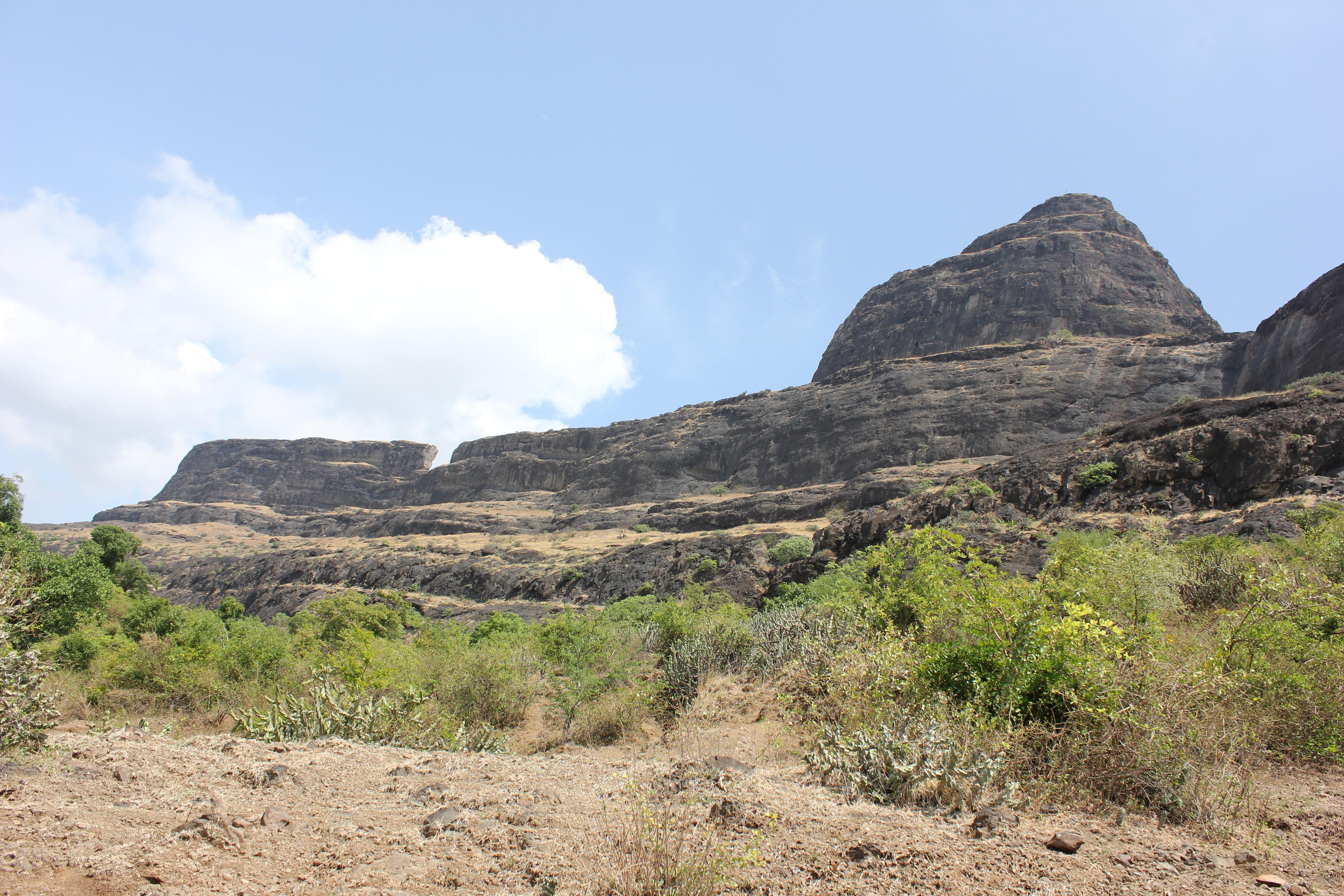
Dhodap from Hatti

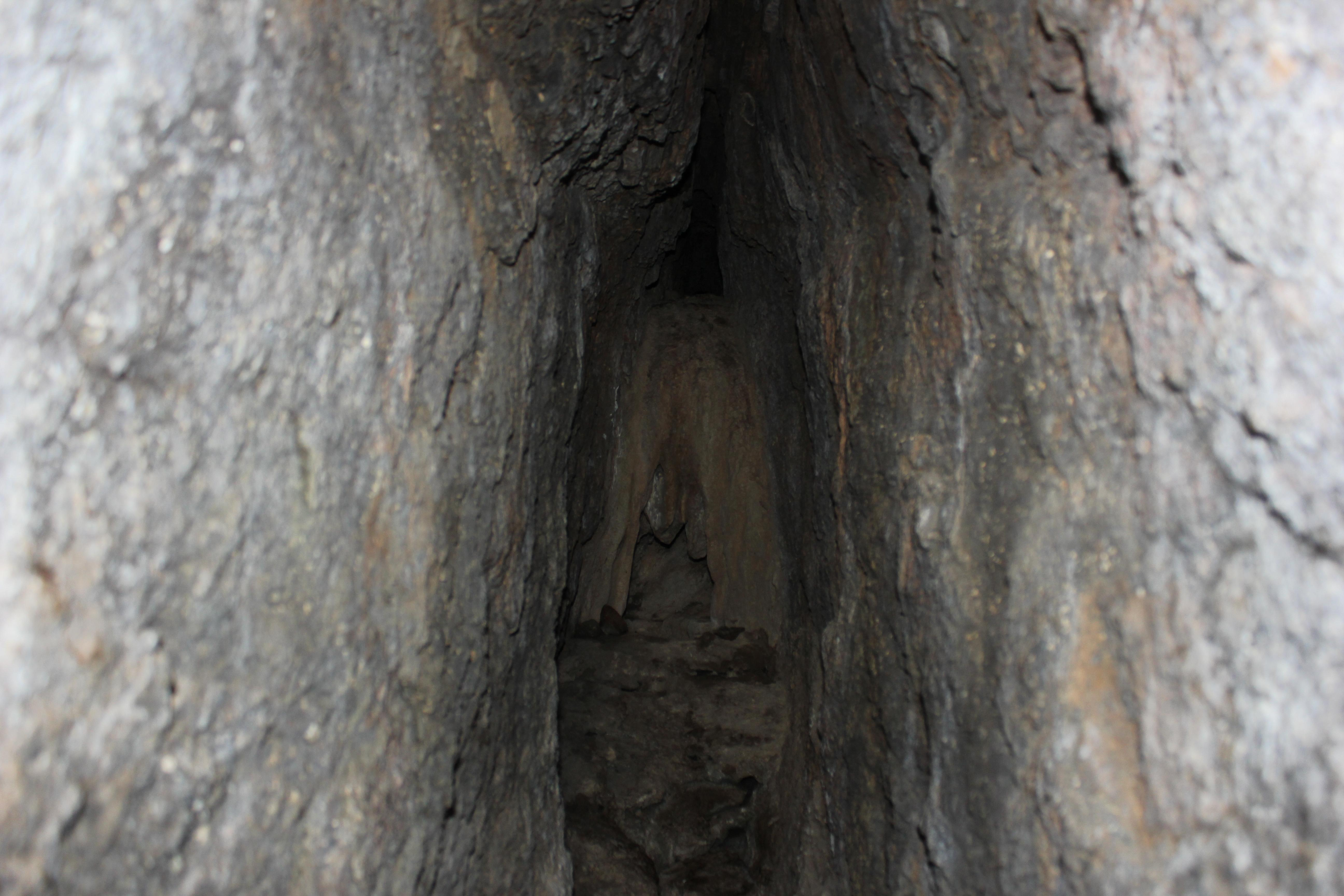
"Cow of stone"

The top of the fort was built using a combination of dressed stone and brickwork. There is a tank with an idol of Lord Hanuman and a tunnel 5m wide. The fort has a pointed cliff named Shembi. One can find caves at the base. One end of the fort shows a domical structure. The eastern face shows a fearsome cliff named Ikhara which is ideal for rock climbers.

One temple situated in one of the caves is in good condition. A few other caves are also seen around and are quite big in size. Also the trunk of Dhodap fort is in good condition.

One of the most interesting things is that there is a "cow of stone" moving inside this hill. It's heard by the peoples in the nearby villages that on every Vasubaras, this cow moves inside by the distance of four grains.

== History ==
During his return from the second raid on Surat (1670 CE), Chhatrapati Shivaji Maharaj visited this fort, presumably for keeping the treasure. A few days later, the Battle of Dindori took place between the Maratha and Mughal forces.

The fort played an important role during the Peshwa period. In 1768, Madhavrao Peshwa defeated the forces of his uncle Raghobadada near Dhodap, after which Raghobadada took refuge in the fort.

== Tourism ==
This fort is a good site for trekkers and adventurous tourists to visit. Accommodation can be arranged at the base village with the help of local villagers. Enough Water is available at the top. However, carry enough water while climbing this fort.

=== Routes ===
One can climb the fort from two routes, from the Dhodambe village side and from the Deola side. From Pune the route is Pune to Nashik (road/rail, 202 km) - Dhodambe (road, 40 km) - Hatti (road, 3 km).

== See also ==
- List of forts in Maharashtra
