= Harishchandragad =

Fort in Maharashtra State, India

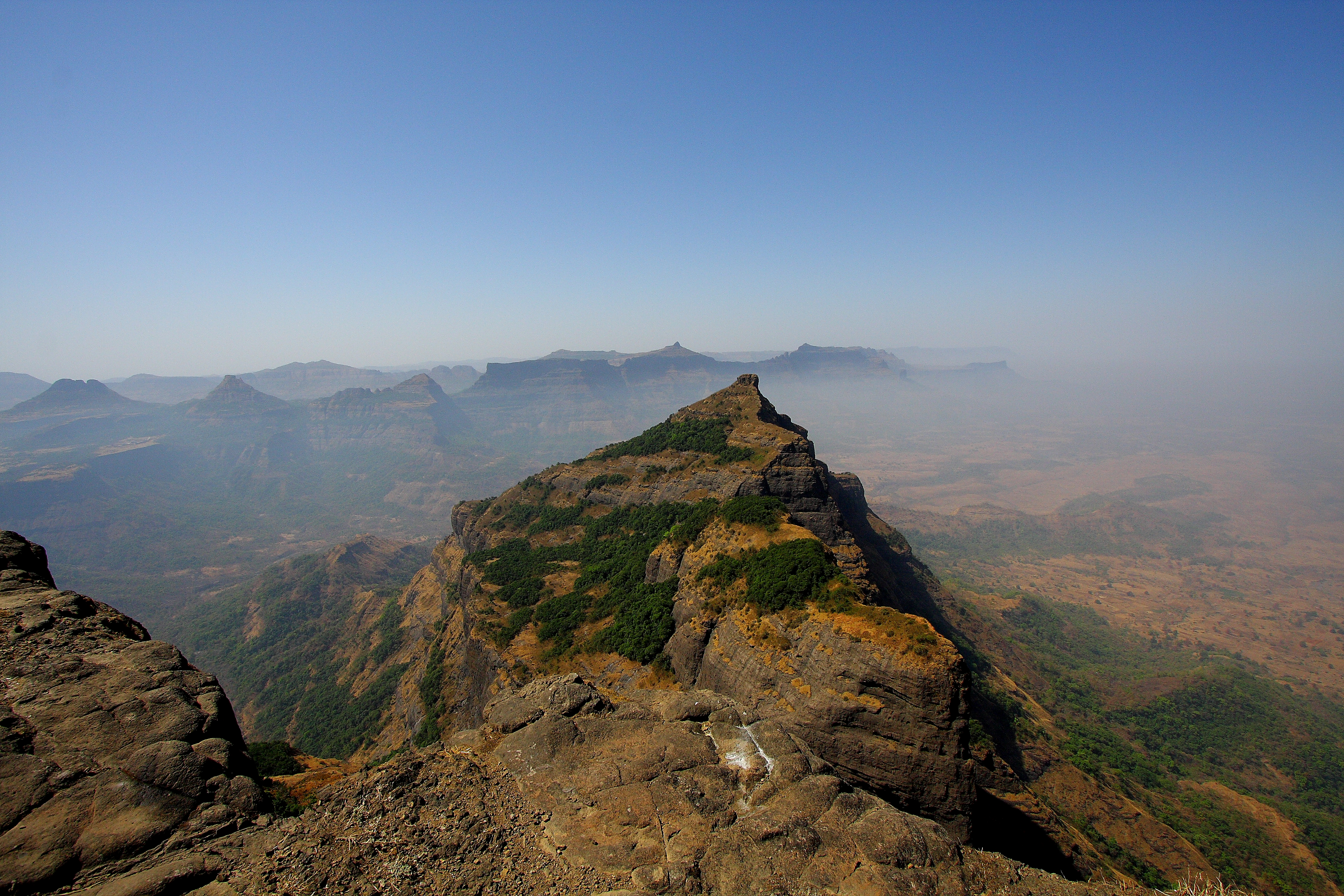
- Kalbhairav pinnacle, Konkan Kada, Harishchandragad

Highest point
- Elevation: 1,422 m (4,665 ft)
- Coordinates: 19°23′18″N 73°46′33″E

Geography
- Location within India
- Location: Ahilyanagar district, India
- Parent range: Western Ghats

Harishchandragad is a hill fort in Ahilyanagar district, Maharashtra, India. Situated in the Western Ghats, it contains rock-cut caves, temples and water cisterns. Monuments include temples and the Kedareshwar cave shrine.

== Geography ==
Harishchandragad is within the Sahyadri mountain range at an elevation of 1,422 metres (4,665 ft). Its western edge includes Konkan Kada, a steep, overhanging cliff facing the Konkan region.

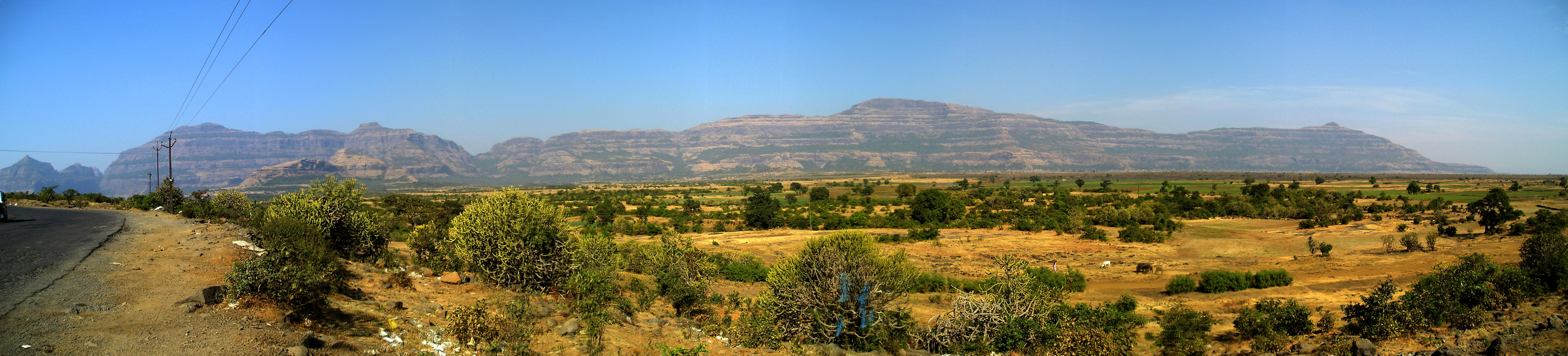
A panoramic view from the basement

== History ==
The caves and temples at Harishchandragad are generally dated to the medieval period. In an archaeological report published in 1883, James Burgess tentatively dated the main temple to the 10th century.

Several rock-cut caves at the site also contain inscriptions naming Nātha yogis.

During the Third Anglo-Maratha War, Harishchandragad was taken into British possession between 4 and 8 May 1818.

== Monuments ==
The caves and temple at Harishchandragad are protected by the Archaeological Survey of India as monuments of national importance.

The Harishchandreshwar Temple is dedicated to Shiva. Burgess described a temple with a central tower and four porches, surrounded by smaller shrines and rock-cut chambers. He also recorded eight numbered caves, some containing carved representations of Ganesha. He suggested that several of the caves were used as dwellings associated with the temple rather than as shrines.

The Kedareshwar cave shrine contains a lingam in a water-filled rock-cut chamber. In 1993-94, the Archaeological Survey of India undertook repairs to the temple complex, including the reconstruction of sections of the enclosure wall and repairs to a smaller shrine.

== Tourism ==
Harishchandragad is a trekking destination, with established routes from Khireshwar and Pachnai villages, as well as the more demanding Nalichi Vaat route. The fort's temples and cave shrines also attract Hindu pilgrims.

== See also ==
- List of forts in Maharashtra
