= Brahmagiri (Maharashtra) =

Hill in the Western Ghats

Brahmagiri hill
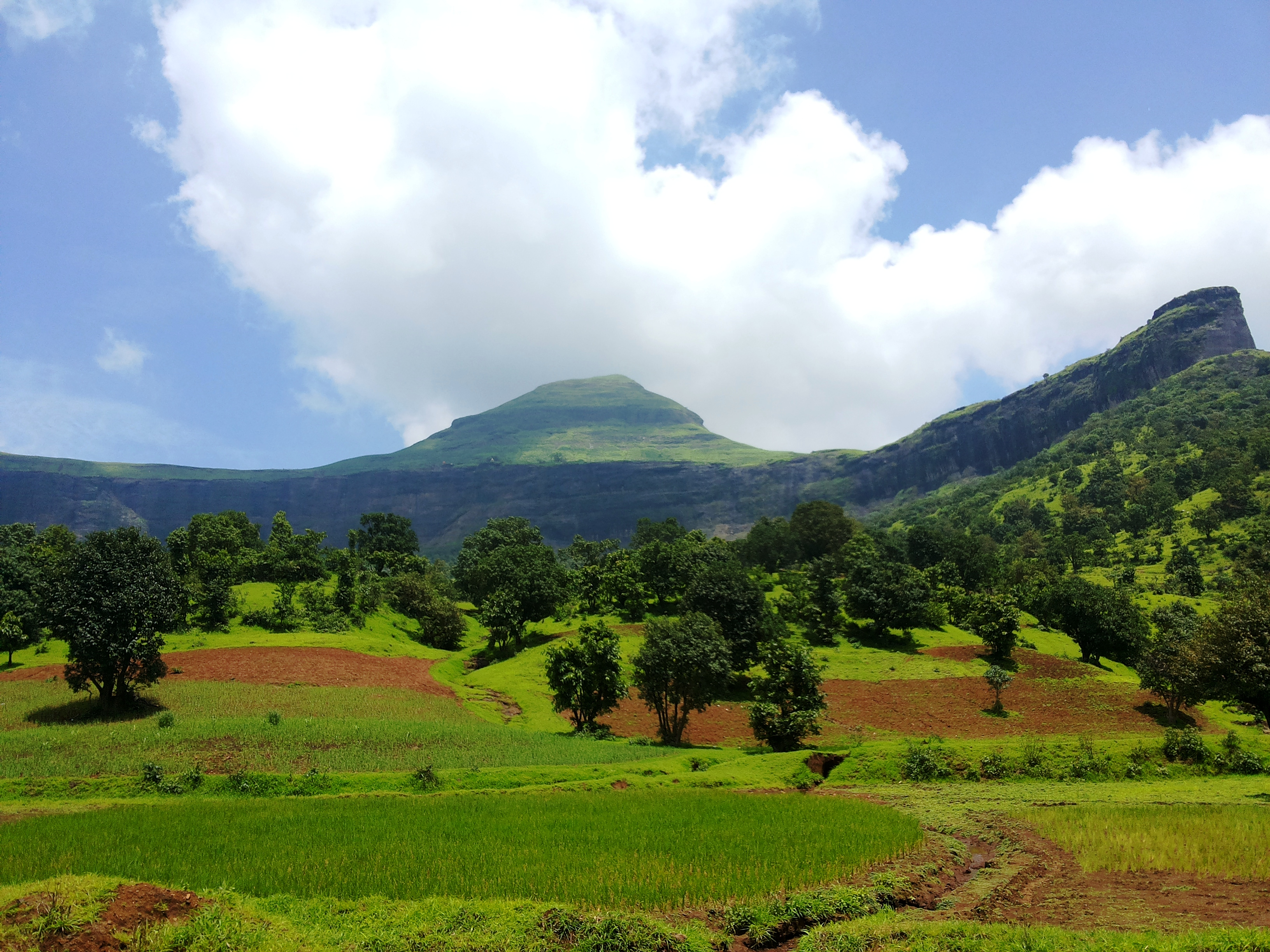
- Brahmagiri hill as seen near Trimbak city.

Highest point
- Elevation: 4,248 ft (1,295 m)
- Coordinates: 19°56′N 73°32′E

Naming
- Native name: ब्रह्मगिरी पर्वत (Marathi)

Geography
- Location: Maharashtra, India
- Parent range: Western Ghats

Climbing
- Easiest route: Bus, Trek

Brahmagiri is a hill in the Western Ghats of Maharashtra. It is situated in Nashik District in the Indian state of Maharashtra. Trimbakeshwar Lord Shiva Temple is located near this place. The origin of the Godavari River, which Hindus consider sacred, is near Trimbak. It flows for 1,465 kilometres (910 mi), first eastwards across the Deccan Plateau then turns southeast, entering the West Godavari district and East Godavari district of Andhra Pradesh, until it splits into two watercourses that widen into a large river delta and flow into the Bay of Bengal.

== Location ==
Brahmagiri, the hill (giri) of Lord Brahma, appear in many mythological and legendary documents. The Puranas state that the Gautama Maharishi and his wife Ahalya resided on this hill. Saint Gautam worshiped Shiva, one of the main deities in Hinduism, to bring Ganga in this hill. This river is known as River Gautami in the Brahmagiri hills.

The undulated terrains of Brahmagiri are challenging spots for travels like nature walk and trekking. There are many trekking trails nestled among the woody trees. The ranges are rich with natural attractions and scenic spots.

Brahmagiri hill is considered as a huge form of Lord Shiva and hence the mountain climbing was considered as a sin at that time. In the year 1908, Seth Lalchand Jashodanand Bhambhani of Karachi (now in Pakistan) and Seth Ganeshdas built 500 steps of stone at a cost of Rs. 40,000. This has facilitated easy access to Brahmagiri. The water flows in three directions on the mountain. The one flowing towards east becomes Godavari River, the one flowing towards the south is Vaitarna river and the one flowing towards the west is called the west-flowing Ganga and meets Godavari near Chakra Tirth. River Ahilya meets Godavari in front of the Trimbakeshwar Jyotirlinga temple. Childless families worship at the Ahilya sangam and it is believed that they do get a child.

The first peak of Sahyadri is called Brahmadri. The story associated with this is that Shankar was pleased with Brahmadev and said "I shall be known by your name". Hence it is called as Brahmagiri. The mountain is 1800 feet high. Its height from sea level is 4248 feet. Five peaks of this mountain are called Sadyo-Jata, Vamdev, Aghora, Ishana and Tat-Purusha and are considered as five mouths of the Lord Shiva and they are worshipped.

== Brahmagiri hill ==
Brahmagiri (1298 meters) is to the west of trimbakeshwar and this fort offers a commanding view of the Jawhar Mokhada region of Thane district. Trimbakeshwar itself is a place of worship because it is one of the 12 Jyotirlingas of Lord Shiva.

From Trimbakeshwar, through regular steps, Ganga dwar is reached and the Gorakshanath cave which is end of Trimbakeshwar. Now again while climbing down, there is a road going towards Brahmagiri towards right. Following this route one reaches the carved steps in the rocks. The steps are very good even in the recent times. They were blown off by Britishers in 1818 but later on, they were rebuilt somewhere before India gained independence. From the base village, Brahmagiri is around 450 to 500 meters elevated

From base village, it takes 45 minutes to see Ganga dwar, the Gorakshanath caves and 108 Swayambhu Mahadev caves and in the halfway while descending, the road towards Brahmagiri takes you till the top in around 45 minutes and almost 2 hours to see the fort completely. There are 2 temples on this fort the place which is believed to be the origin point of Godavari River. From here, the river flows till Ganga dwar and then towards Kushavart teerth in Trimbakeshwar village.

One can reach this place by an ascent of about 750 steps made on concrete. There is a shrine dedicated to Goddess Ganga. The river appears here as coming out from the mouth of Nandi. Kolambika Devi temple and a group of 108 shivalings are seen nearby.

== Transportation ==
Brahmagiri can be reached by bus from Nashik till Trimbak

== Gallery ==
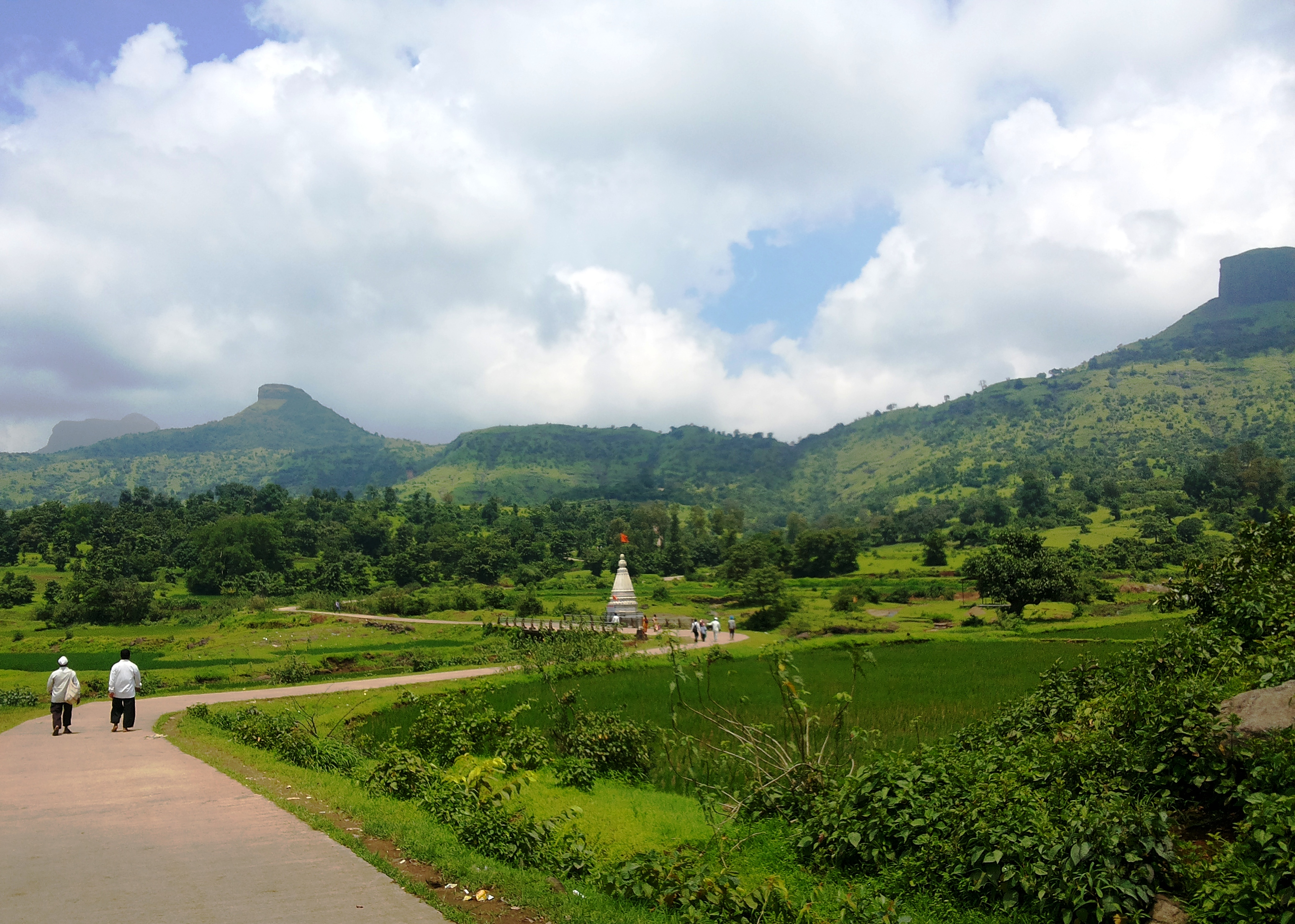
Route of Pheri of Brahmhagiri hill Nasik

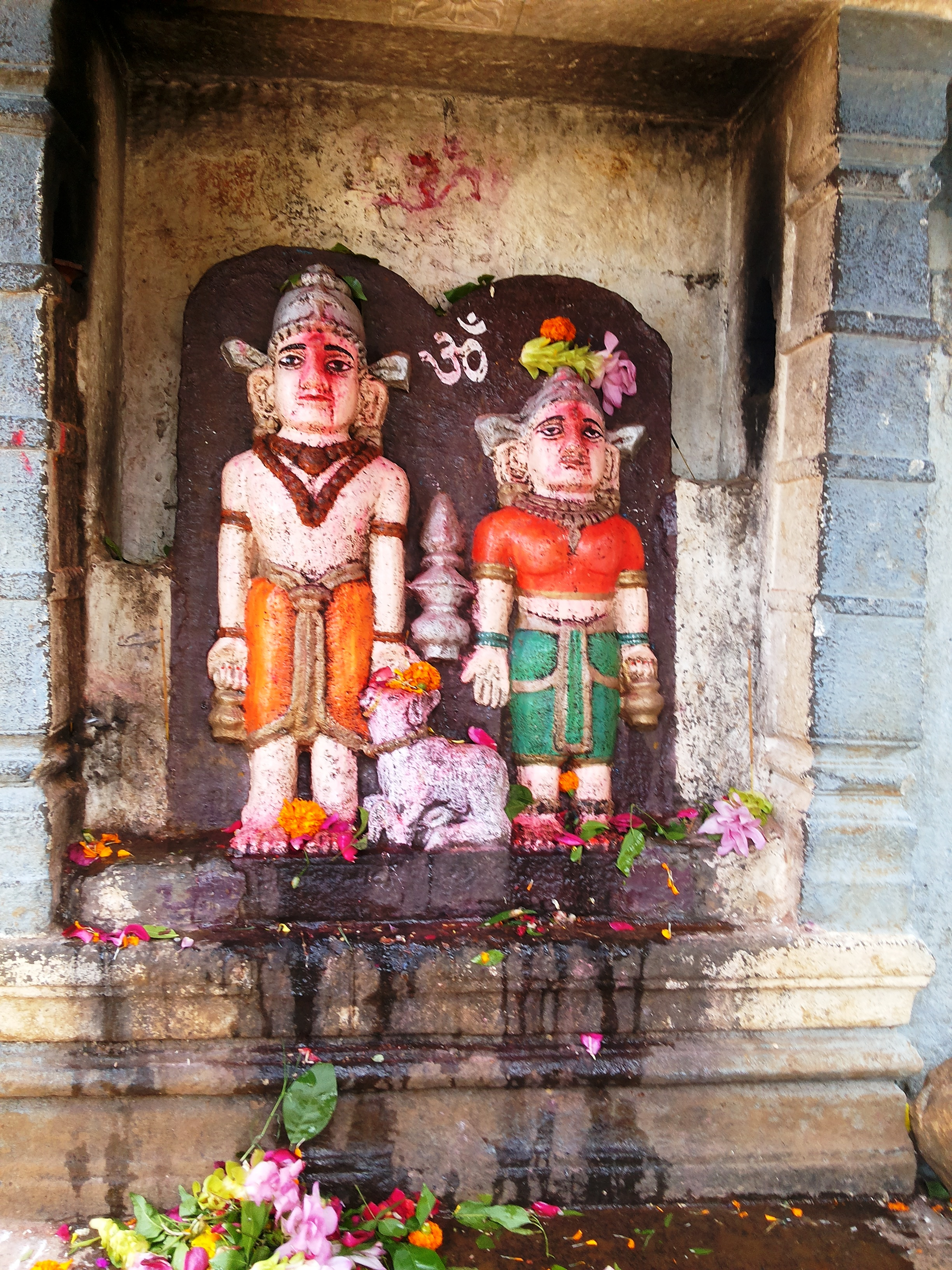
Gautam Rhushi Temple at Brahmhagiri hill Nasik

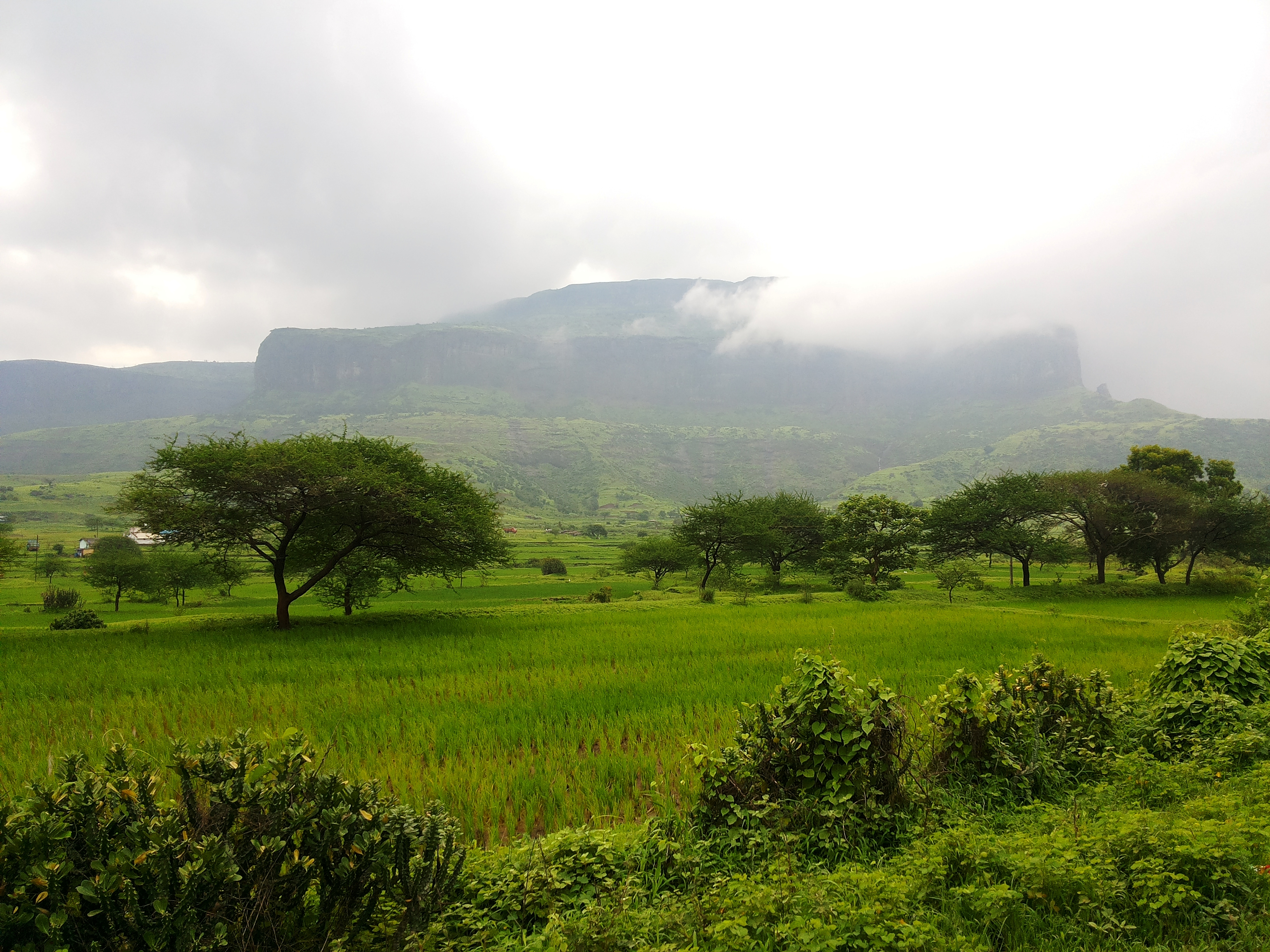
Anjineri fort near Brahmhagiri hill, Nasik

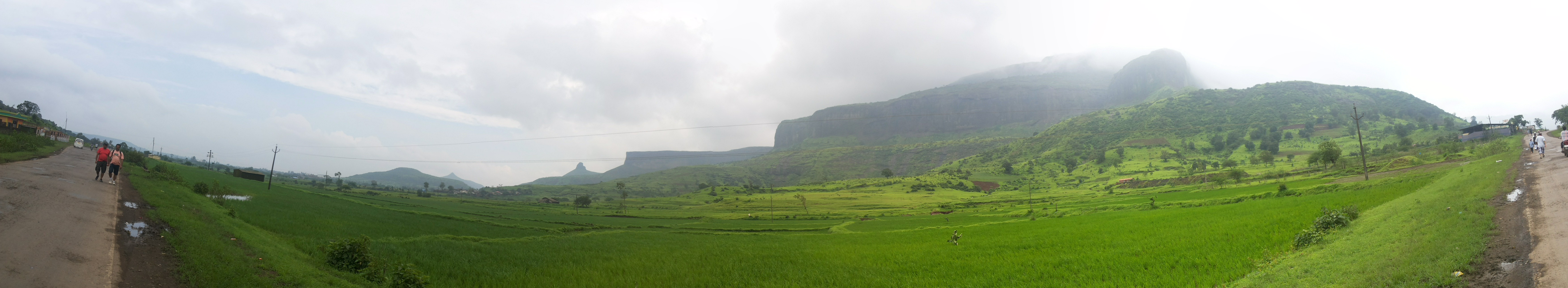
Panoramic view of Brahmhagiri hill Nasik

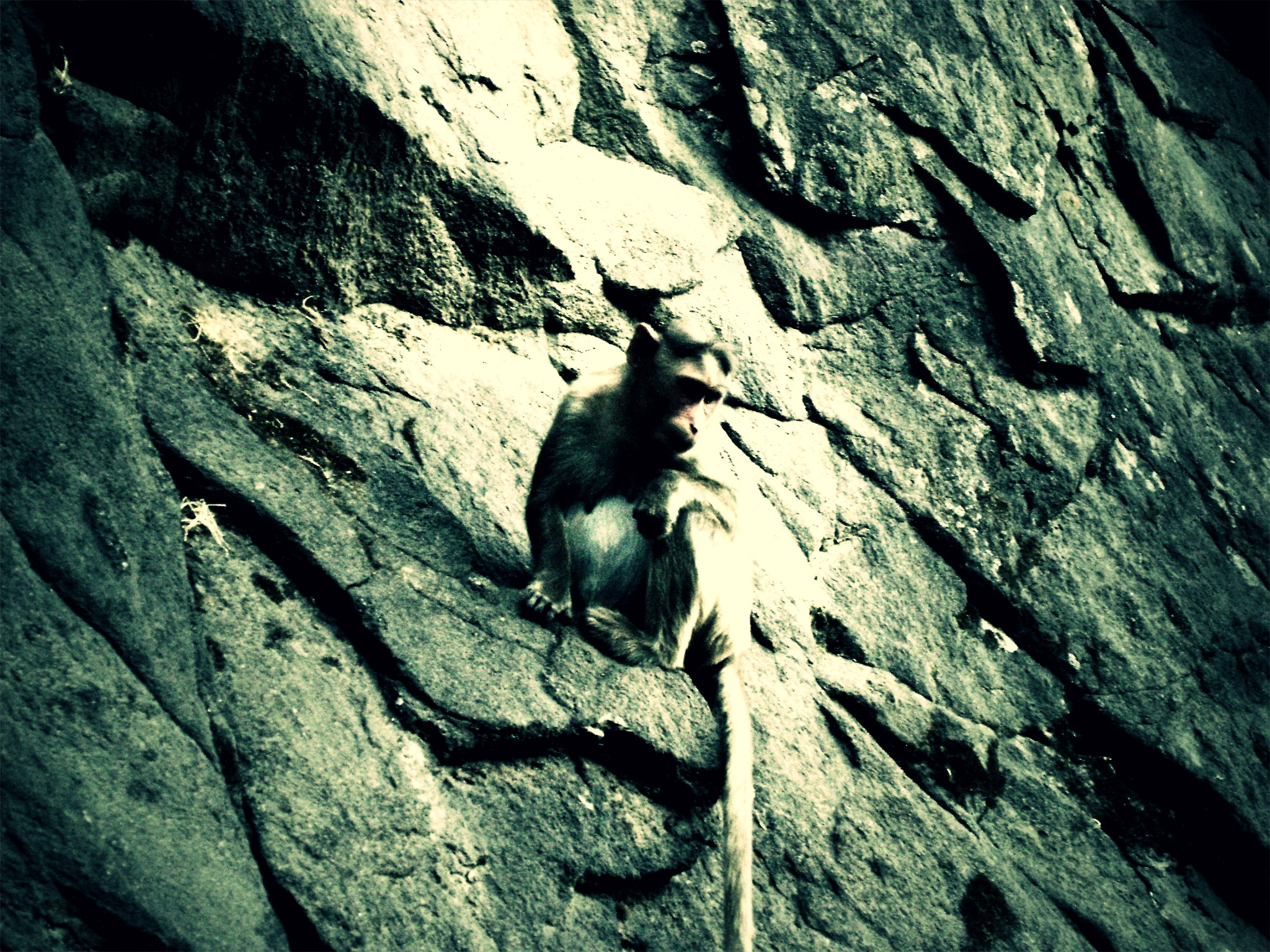
A Monkey climbing at Brahmagiri hill.
