= Trimbakeshwar Range =

Mountain range in Maharashtra, India

Trimbakeshwar Range, Maharashtra
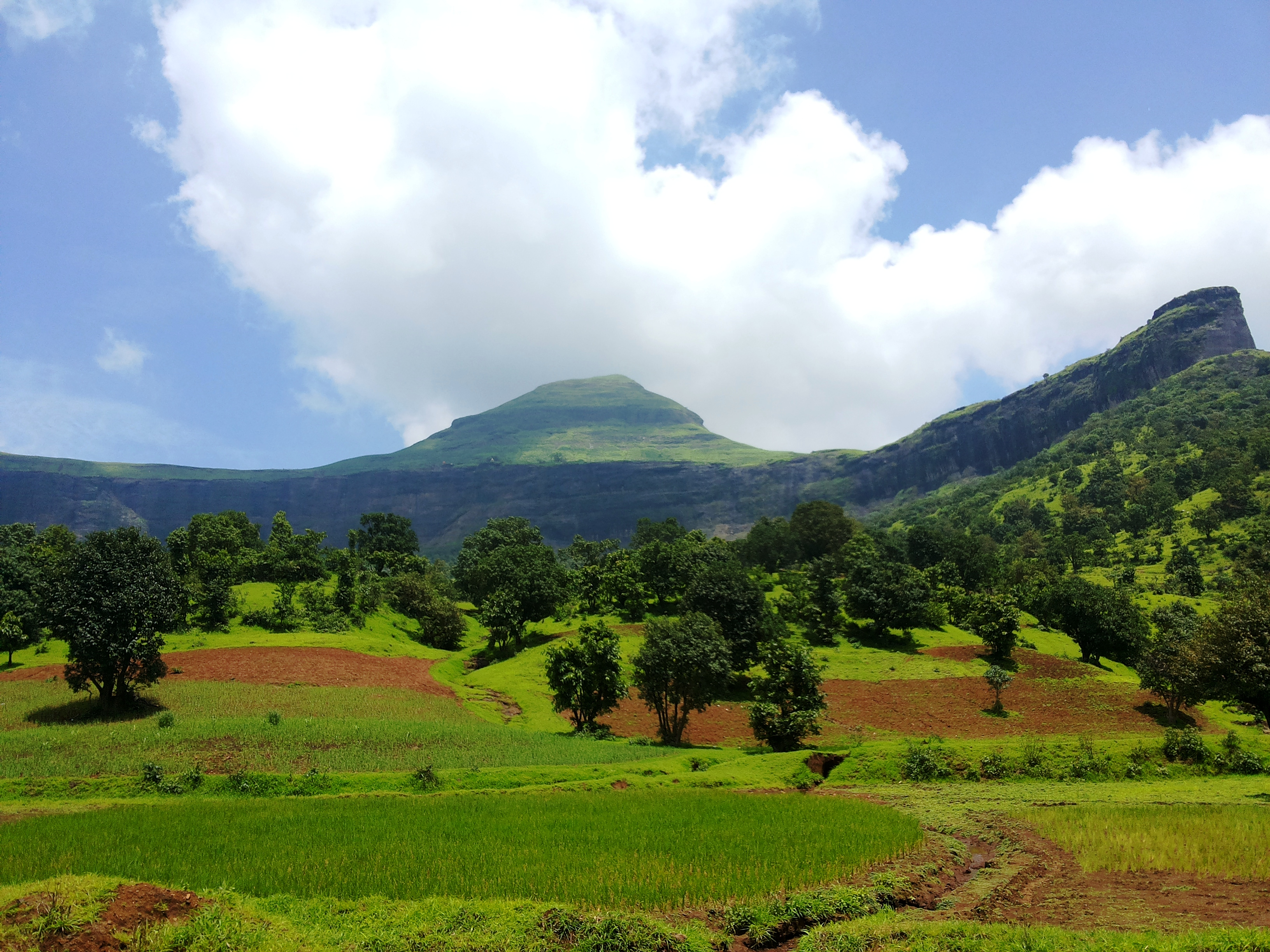
- Brahmagiri peak

Highest point
- Elevation: 4,248 ft (1,295 m)
- Coordinates: 19°55′N 73°30′E

Naming
- Native name: त्र्यंबकेश्वर पर्वत (Marathi)

Geography
- Location within Maharashtra
- Location: Maharashtra, India
- Parent range: Western Ghats

Trimbakeshwar Range is a mountain range in the Western Ghats of Maharashtra, entirely situated in the Nashik District. The range lies 30 kilometres (19 mi) southwest to the district headquarters Nashik. The saddle shaped depression of the Brahmagiri mountain protects Trimbak, a town considered holy by Hindus Devotees throng to this town to pay visit to the sacred Trimbakeshwar Shiva Temple. The northern face of the range is the birthplace of the Godavari. The southern face of these hills are covered with dense forests and thus form a catchment area for the Upper Vaitarna Reservoir—a water supply source for Mumbai.

Trimbakeshwar range also contain the Anjaneri hills though a minority of authors consider the latter to be a distinct range and often prefer to use the synonym Trimbak-Anjaneri to avoid disambiguation.

== Geography ==
The range lies on a west to east axis southwest of Nashik resting on the western edge of the Deccan Plateau. The range consists of flood basalt and lies within the region which is known as the Deccan Traps. The range can be accessed from the city via NH848.

== List of peaks ==
Name	Elevation in meters !
Brahmagiri	1,295
Anjaneri	1,280
Harihar	1,120
Bhaskargad	1,086
Tringalwadi	987
Ghargad	962
Dhoria	926
Walavihir	916
Kavnai	914
