= Kalsubai =

Mountain in India

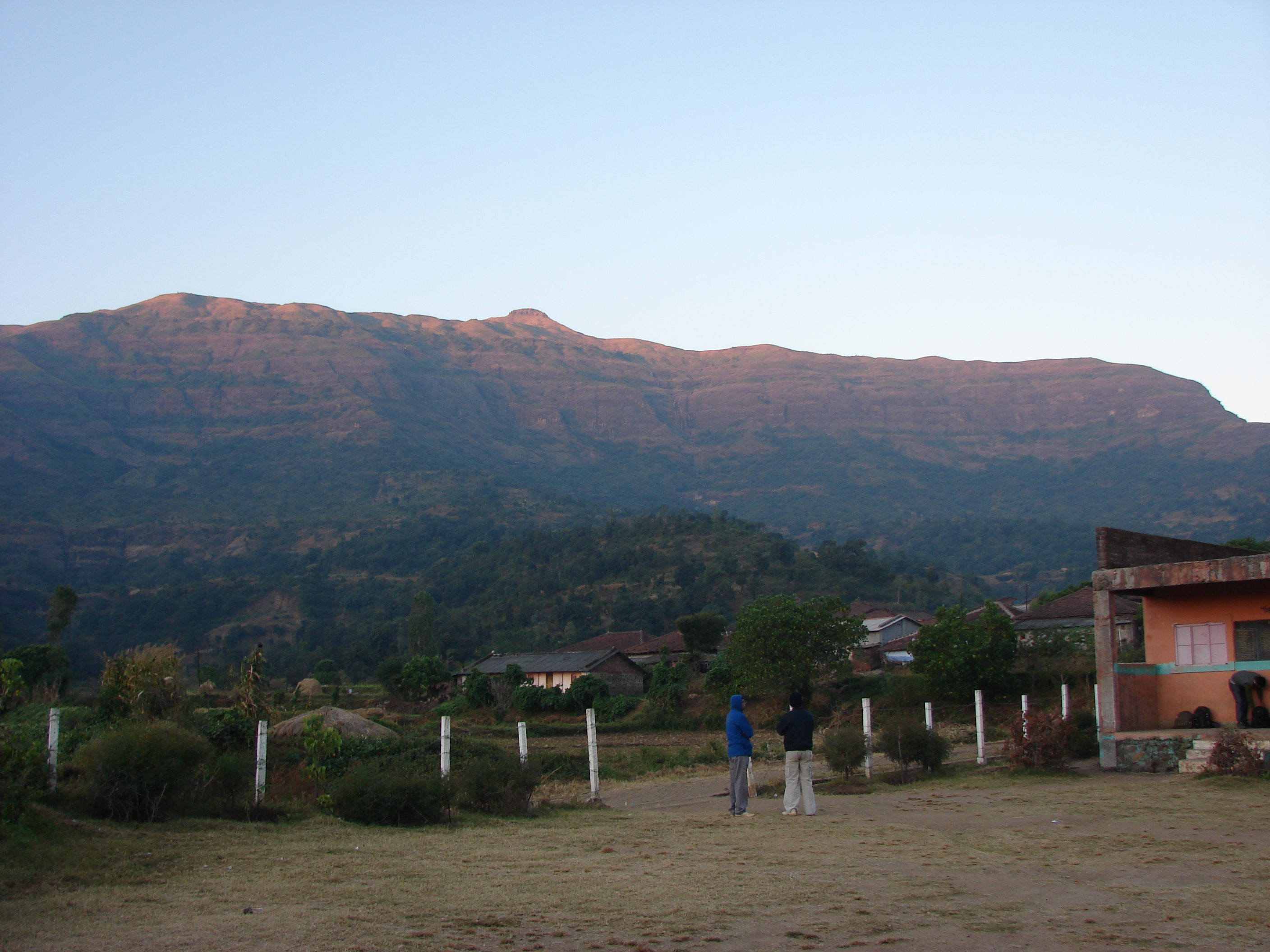
- Kalsubai, highest peak in Maharashtra

Highest point
- Elevation: 1,646 m (5,400 ft)
- Prominence: 1,079 m (3,540 ft)
- Listing: List of Indian states and territories by highest point, Ribu
- Coordinates: 19°36′04″N 73°42′33″E

Geography
- Location within Maharashtra
- Location: Akole Taluka, Ahilyanagar District, Maharashtra, India
- Parent range: Western Ghats

Geology
- Rock age: Cenozoic
- Mountain type: Flood basalt
- Rock types: Basalt; Laterite

Climbing
- Easiest route: Hiking

Kalsubai is a mountain in the Western Ghats, located in the Indian state of Maharashtra. Kalsubai is the highest peak in Maharashtra and is located in Ahilyanagar district in Akole Taluka. Its summit, situated at an elevation of 1,646 metres (5,400 ft), is the highest point in Maharashtra and is known as the "Everest of Maharashtra".

The mountain range lies within the Kalsubai-Harishchandragad Wildlife Sanctuary. It is visited throughout the year by avid trekkers, Kalsubai temple devotees and wildlife enthusiasts. It is named after one of the three tribal sisters Kalsubai, Ratnabai and Katrabai. The other peak, Ratangad, is named after Ratnabai.

== Geology ==
The mountain range was formed by the same geological events that gave birth to the Western Ghats. Resting on the Deccan Plateau, a large igneous province, it consists of solidified flood basalt dating back to the Cenozoic era.

== Geography and topography ==
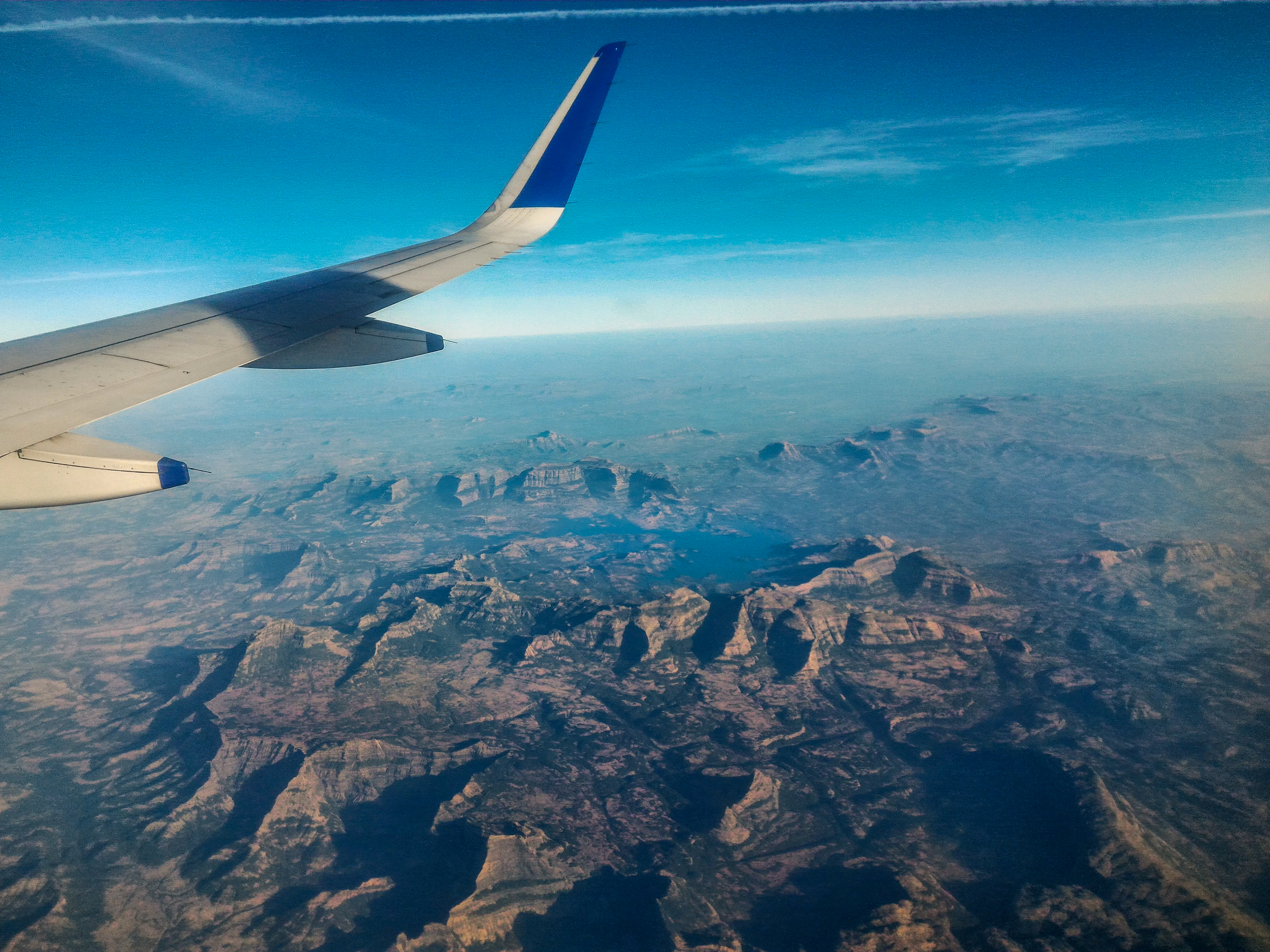
Kalsubai seen from 20,000 feet

The peak along with the adjoining hills spans alona downward-slanting east to the west axis eventually merging with the formidable escarpment of the Western Ghats at almost right angles. Along its length, they form a natural boundary demarcating the Igatpuri Taluka, Nashik district at its north from the Akole taluka, Ahmednagar district at its south. The mountain itself lies on the Deccan Plateau, with its base at an elevation of 587 metres (1,926 ft) above mean sea level.

The mountain along with adjoining hills forms an enormous catchment area for the Arthur Lake which it overlooks.

== Trekking ==
Kalsubai is a 13.2 km-long (8.2 mi) round-trip trek from Bari, with an elevation gain of around 2,700 feet (820 m). This is a one-day trek having a moderately hard difficulty level, with lush green landscapes and multiple waterfalls.

== Dam ==
Bhandardara Dam, located 6 km away, impounds the Pravara river to form the Arthur Lake.

== Photo gallery ==
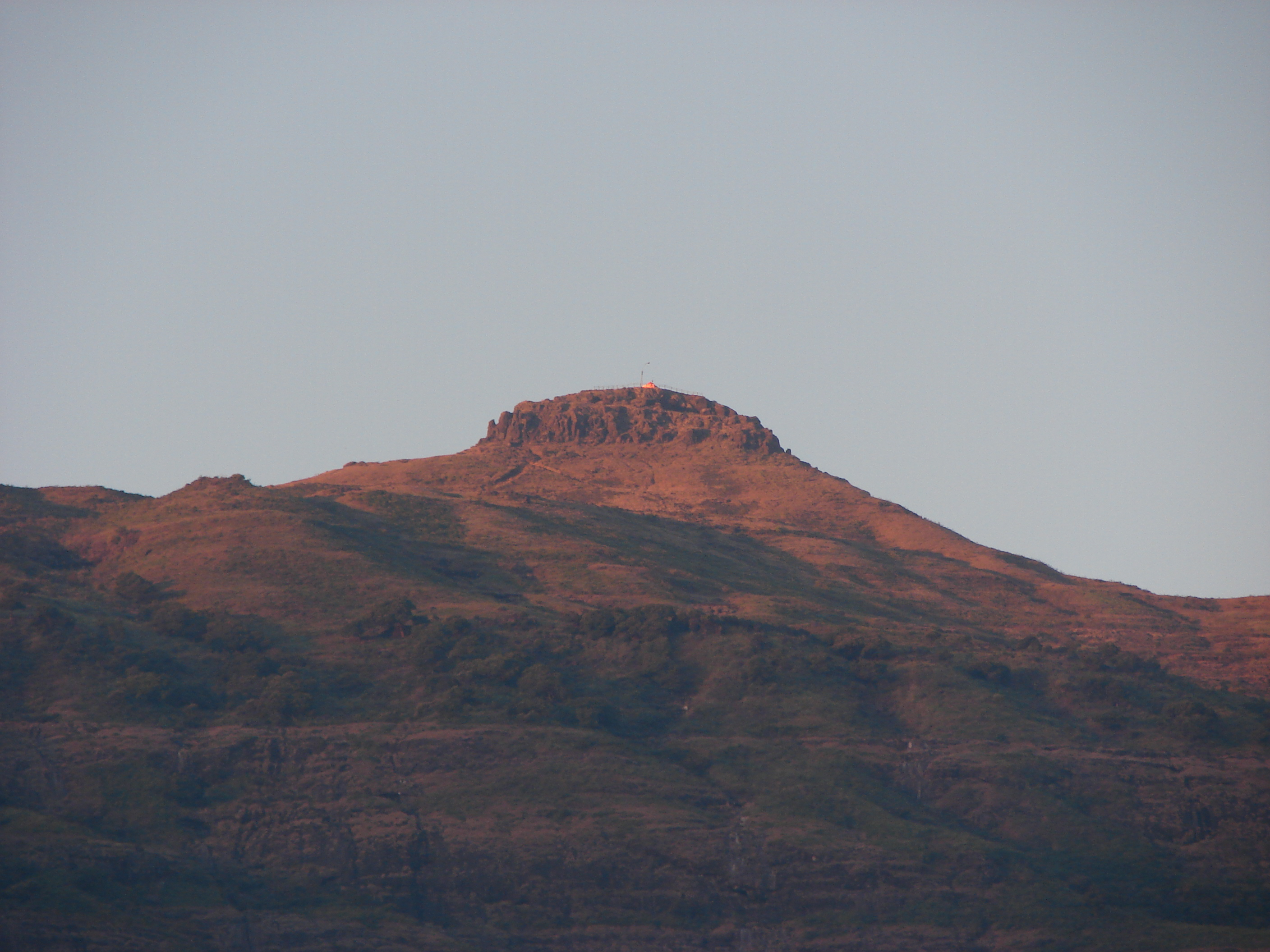
Kalsubai

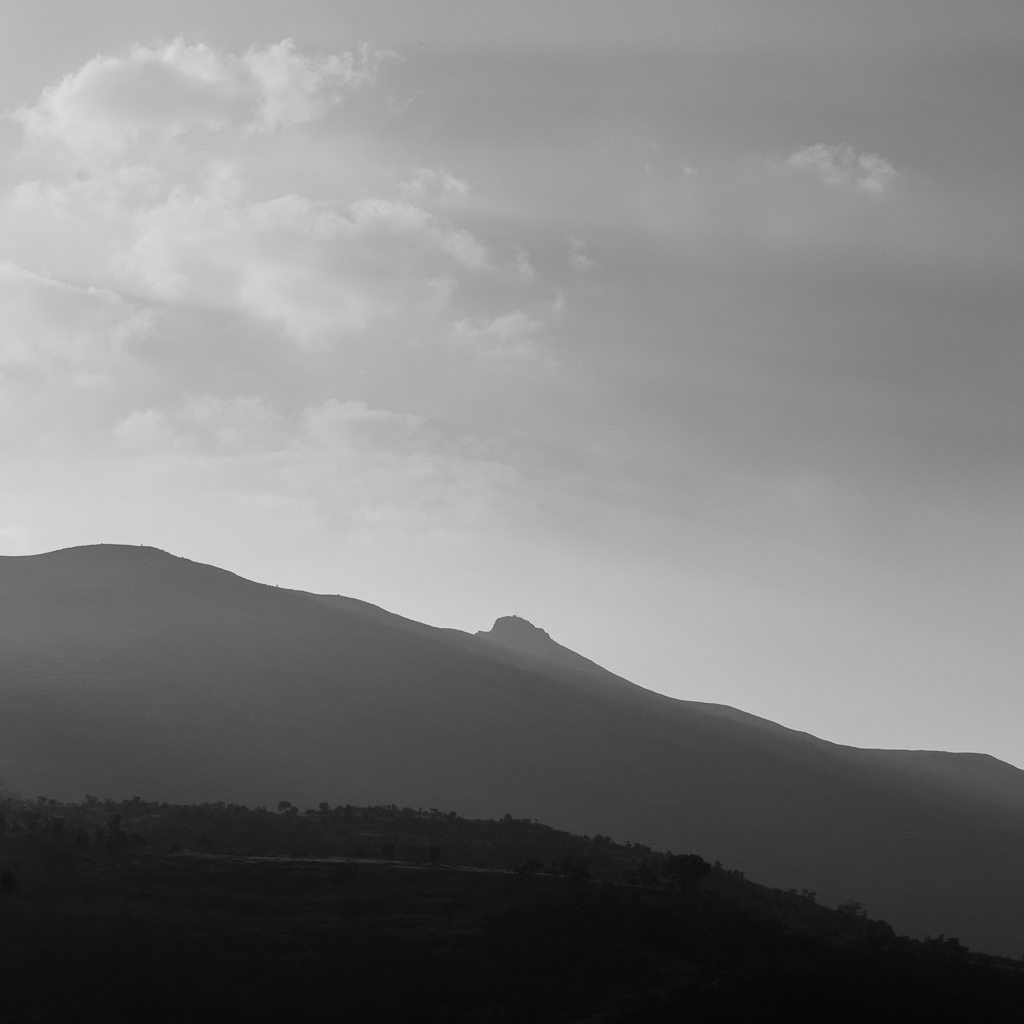
Peak of Kalsubai photographed in late evening

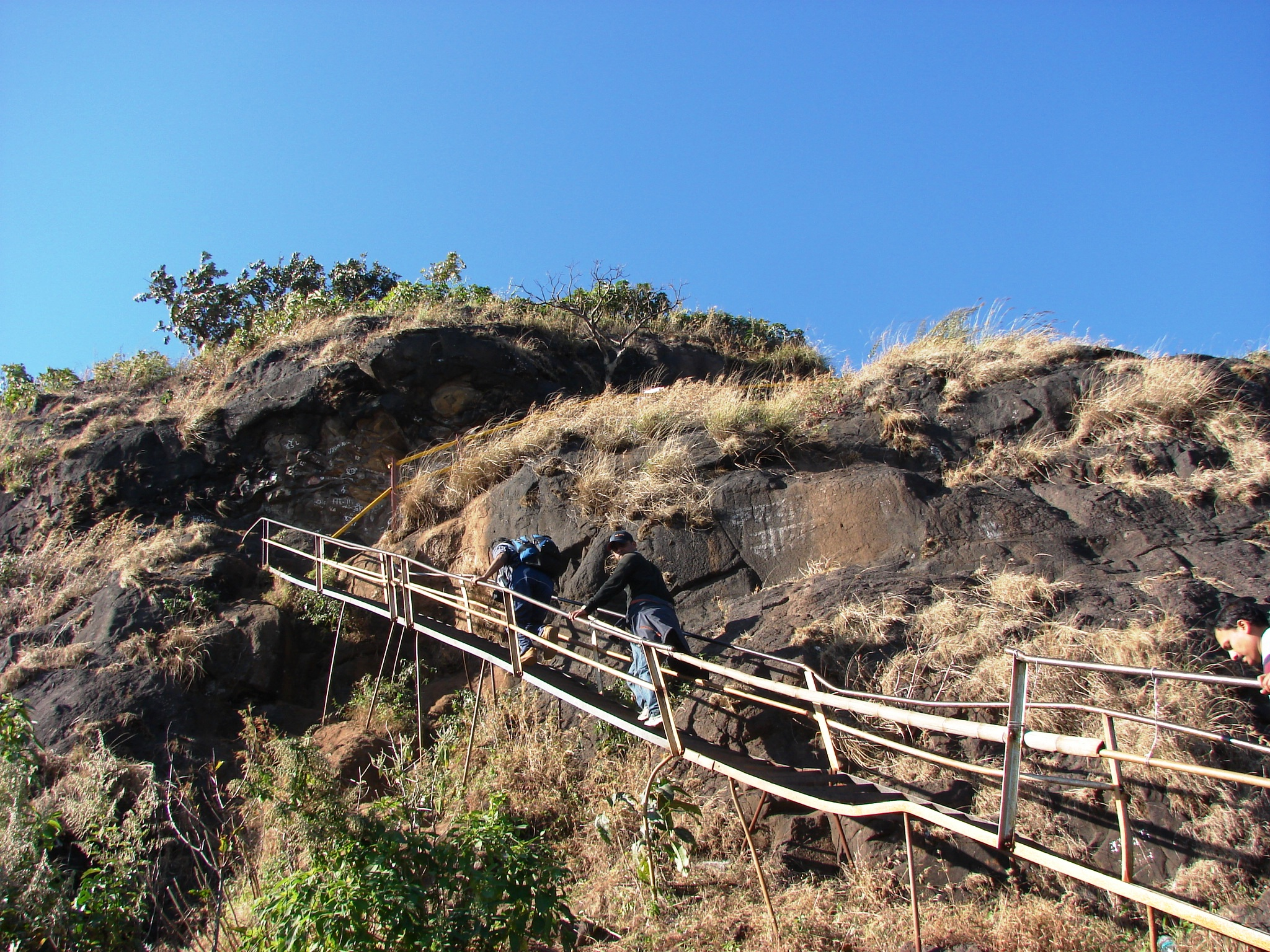
Kalasubai steps to reach on top

== See also ==
- List of mountain peaks of Maharashtra
- List of Indian states and union territories by highest point
- Salher
- Western Ghats (Sahyadris)
