= Salher =

Fort in India

Salher Fort
- Part of Dolbari Range
- Salher, Nashik
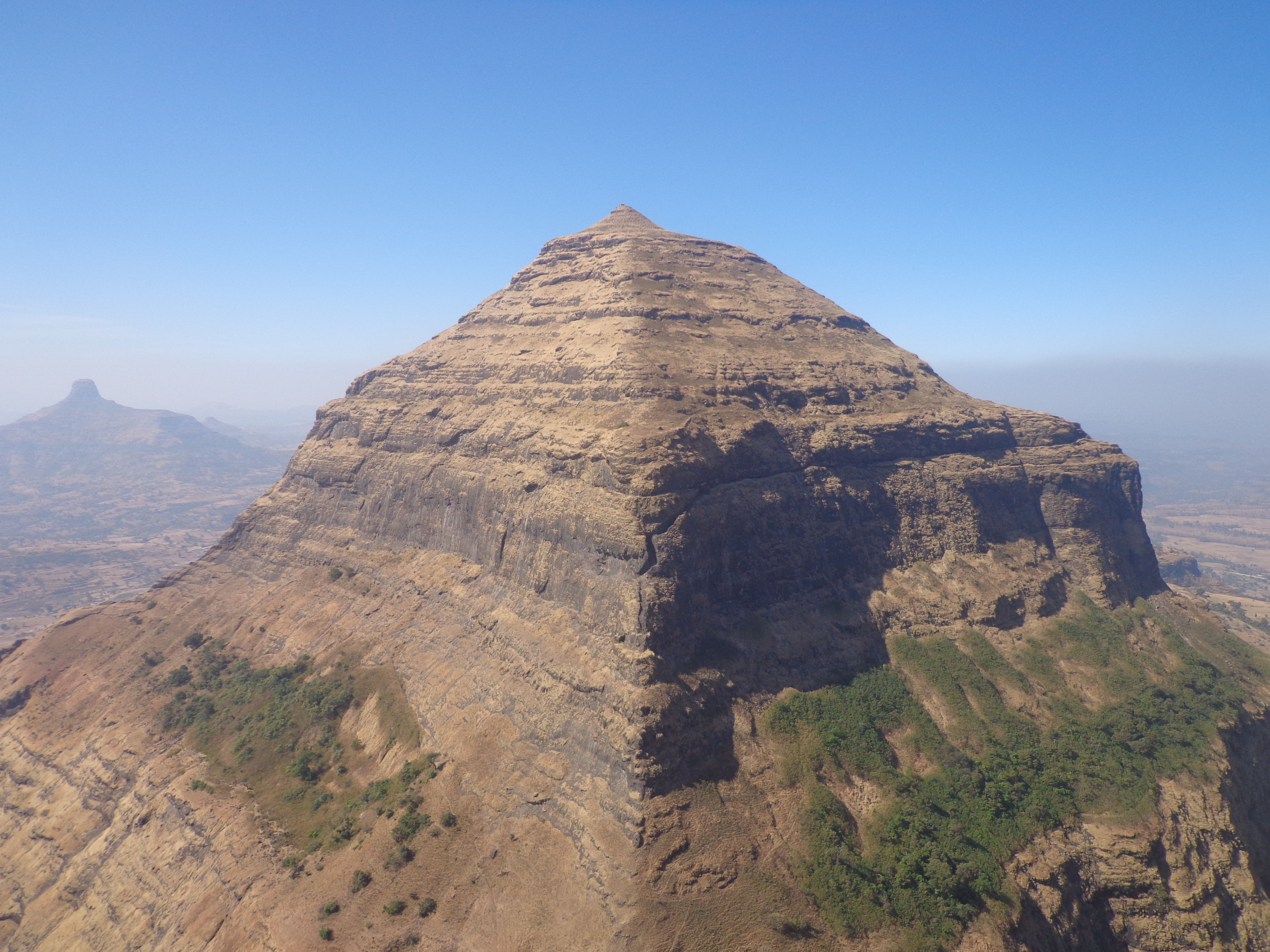
- Salher fort

Site information
- Owner: Govt. of India
- Open to the public: yes
- Condition: dilapidated

Location
- Shown within Maharashtra
- Location within Maharashtra
- Coordinates: 20.7222604°N 73.9454556°E
- Height: 1,566 m (5,138 ft)

Site history
- Materials: Stone, Lime and Lead
- Battles/wars: Battle of Salher

Garrison information
- Occupants: Shivaji, British

UNESCO World Heritage Site
- Part of: Maratha Military Landscapes of India
- Criteria: Cultural: iv, vi
- Reference: 1739-001
- Inscription: 2025 (47th Session)

Salher is a place located near Salher Village in Satana tehsil in Nashik district of Maharashtra, India. The old name of Salher was Gavalgarh. It is the site of the highest fort in the Sahyadri mountains and the second highest peak at 1,567 metres (5,141 ft) after Kalsubai in Maharashtra and 32nd highest peak in Western Ghats. This was a fort of the Maratha Empire. The money acquired after raiding Surat was brought to this fort first on its way to the Maratha capital forts.

== History ==
Salher Fort was under Shrimant Sardar Suryajirao Kakade in 1671. The Mughals attacked the fort in 1672. Almost one lakh soldiers fought in this war. Many soldiers died in this battle but finally Chhatrapati Shivaji Maharaj sent Suryajirao Kakade who won the Battle of Salher. Of all the face to face battles between the Mughals and Suryajirao Kakade's troops, the battle of Salher takes first place. After winning Salher, the Marathas also captured Mulher and established their reign over the Baglan region. In the 18th century, the Peshwas occupied this fort and later by the British.

The Marathas defeated the Mughals at the Battle of Salher in 1672 in an open battlefield on a plain. This was an extremely bloody battle as over 10,000 Mughal soldiers were slaughtered by the Maratha army. This battle shattered the myth of Mughal invincibility and proved that the Marathas could defeat the Mughals even in direct, pitched warfare.

== Gallery ==
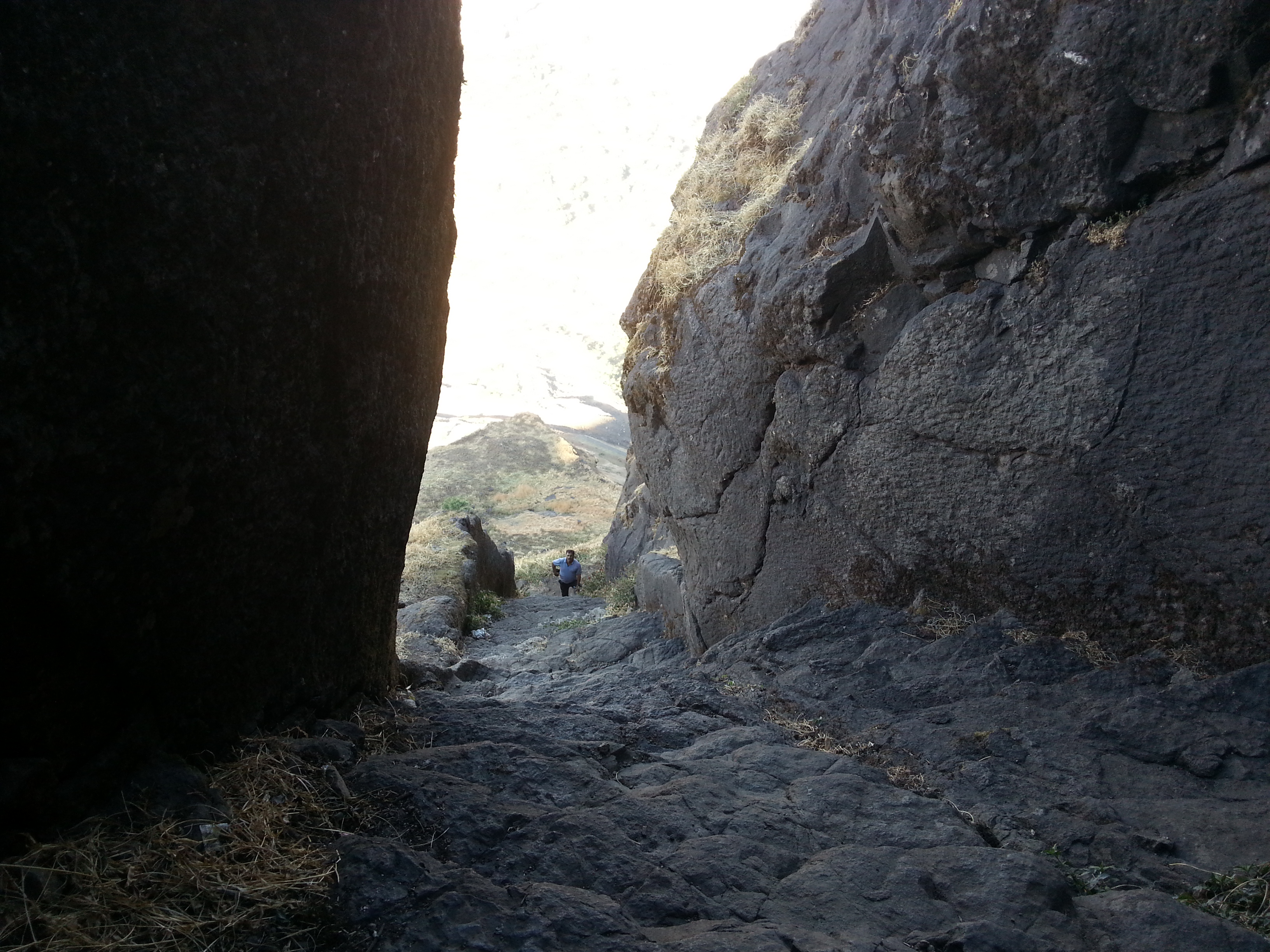
Gate

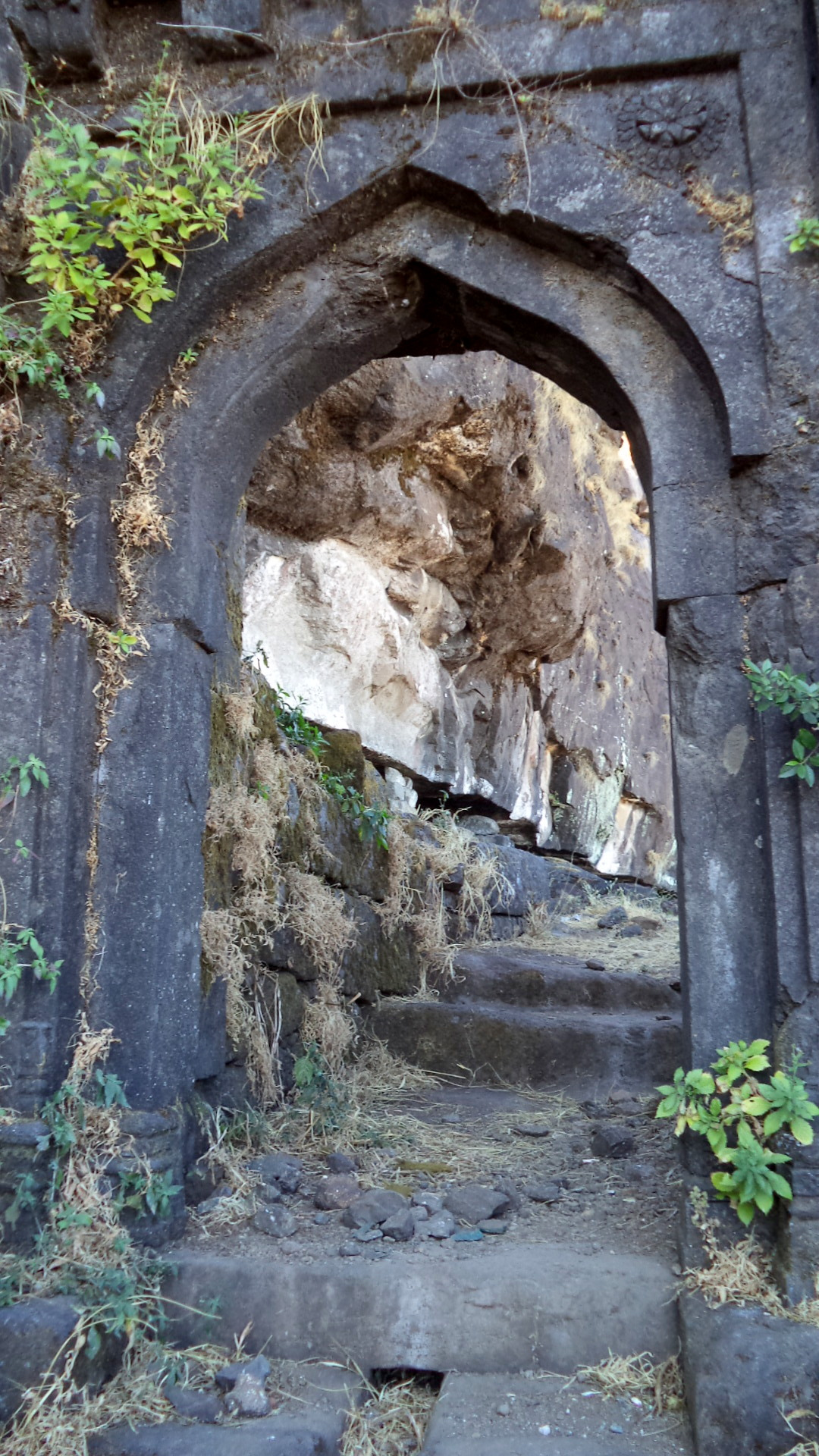
Rock cut steps

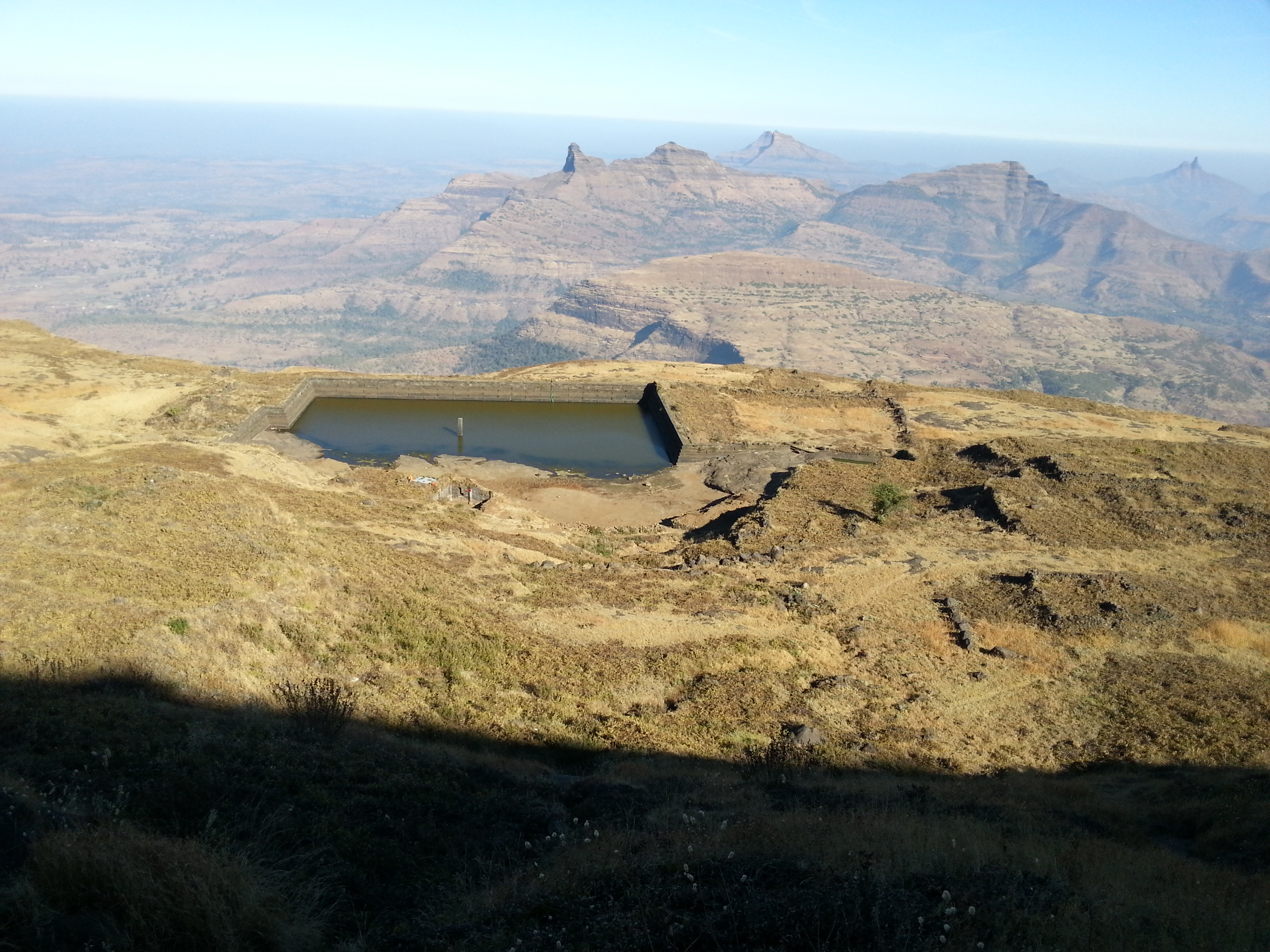
Gangasagar Lake

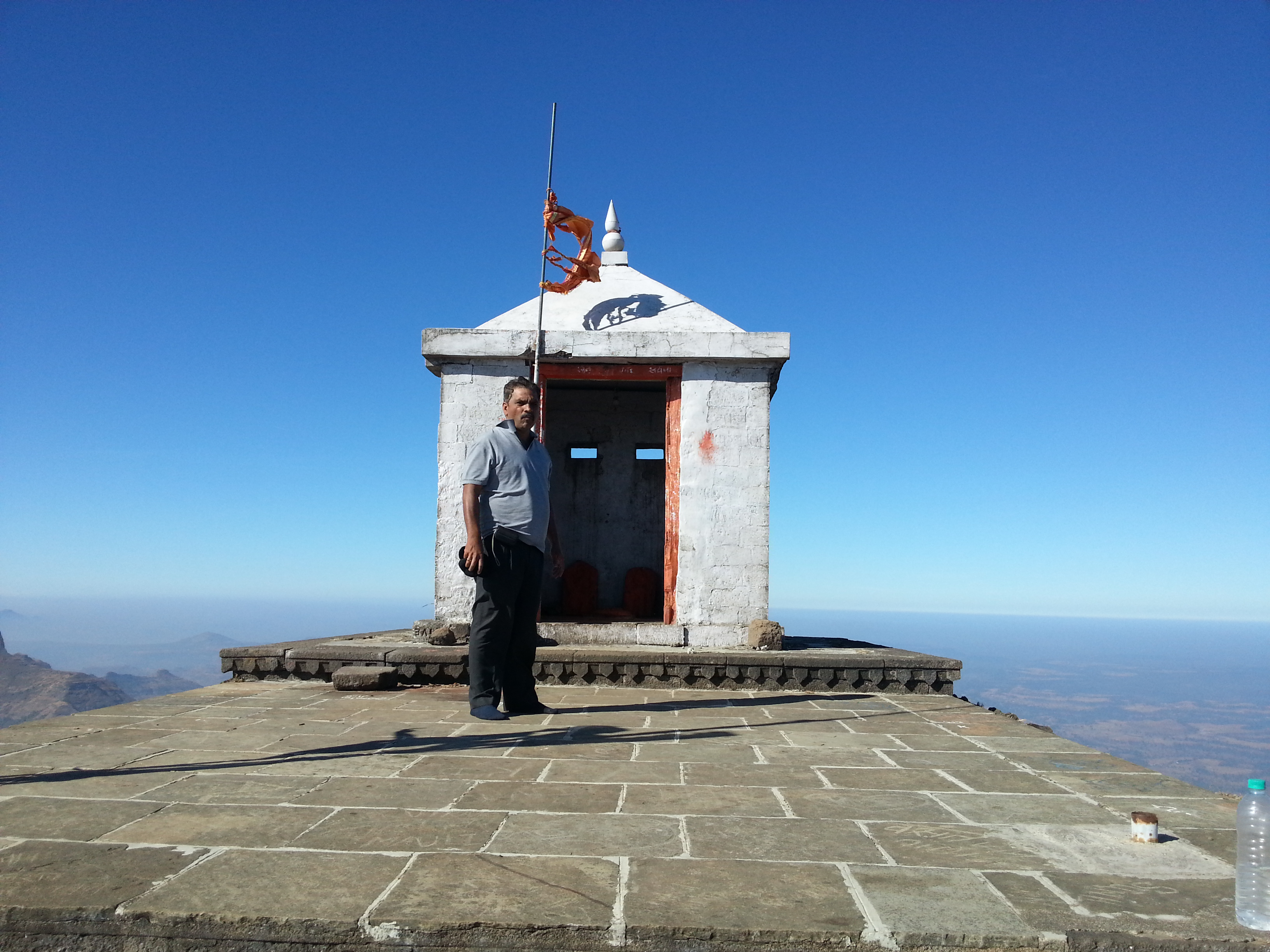
Shree Parshuram Maharaj Temple

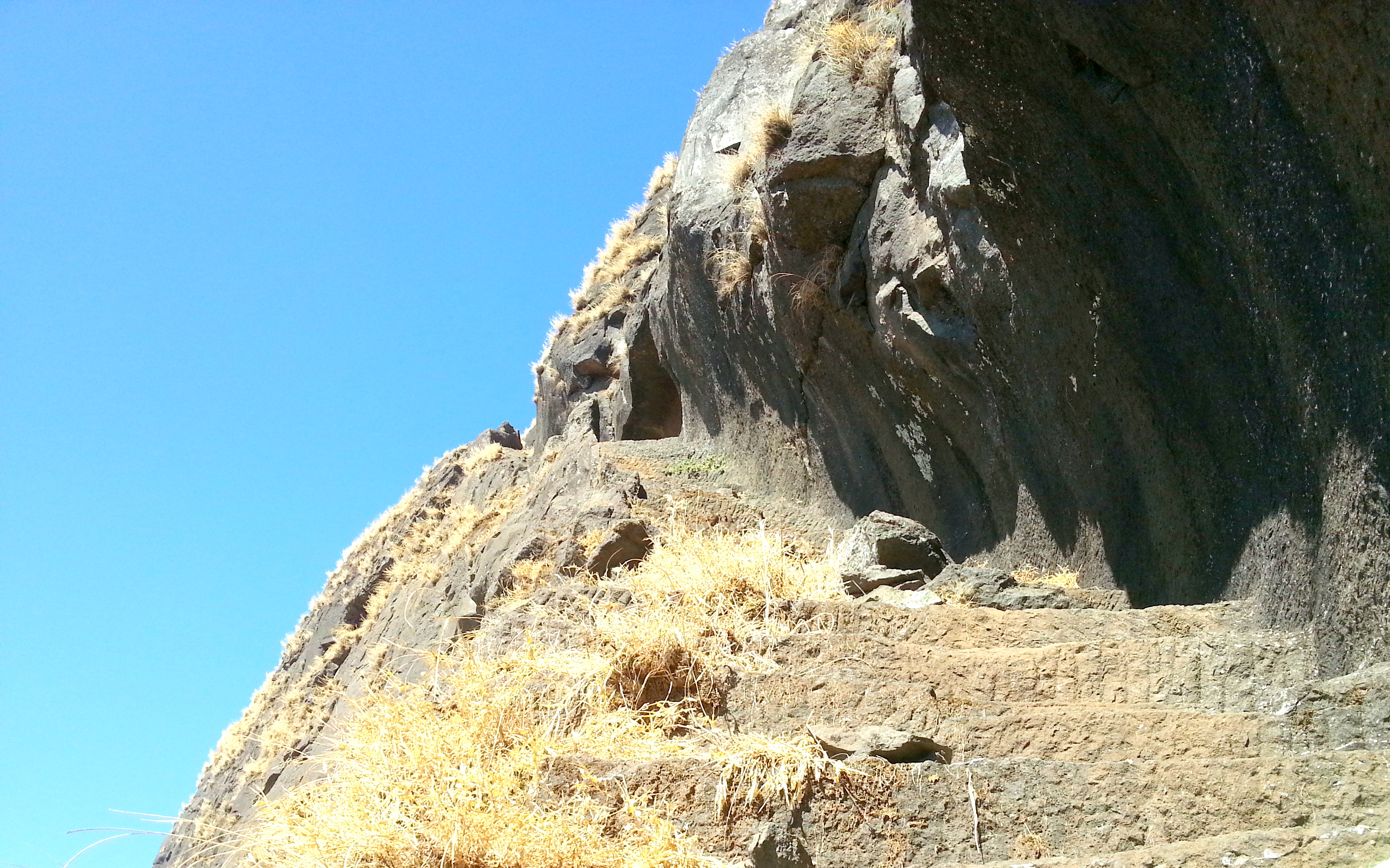
Rock cut walk ways

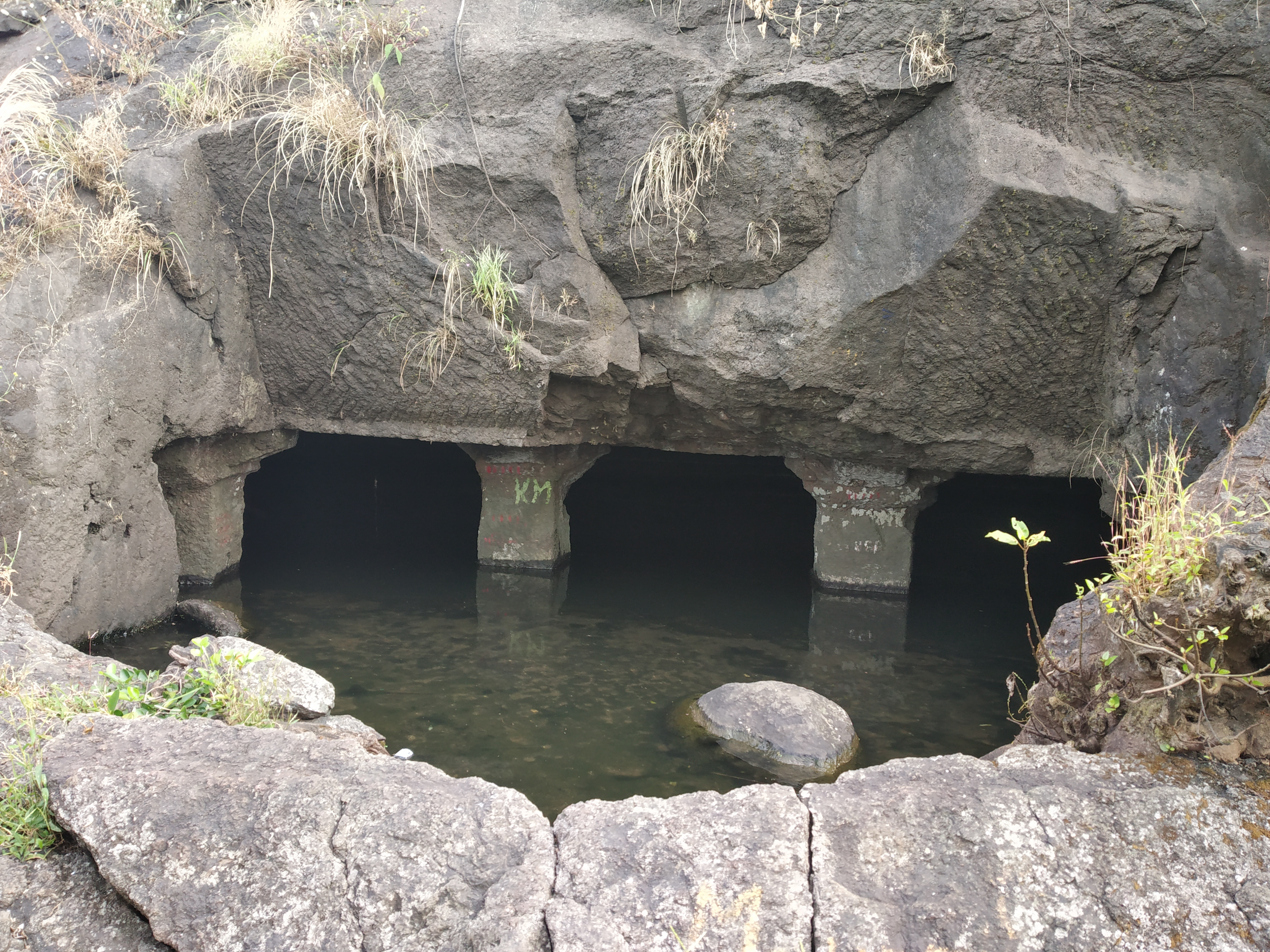
Rockcut water cistern

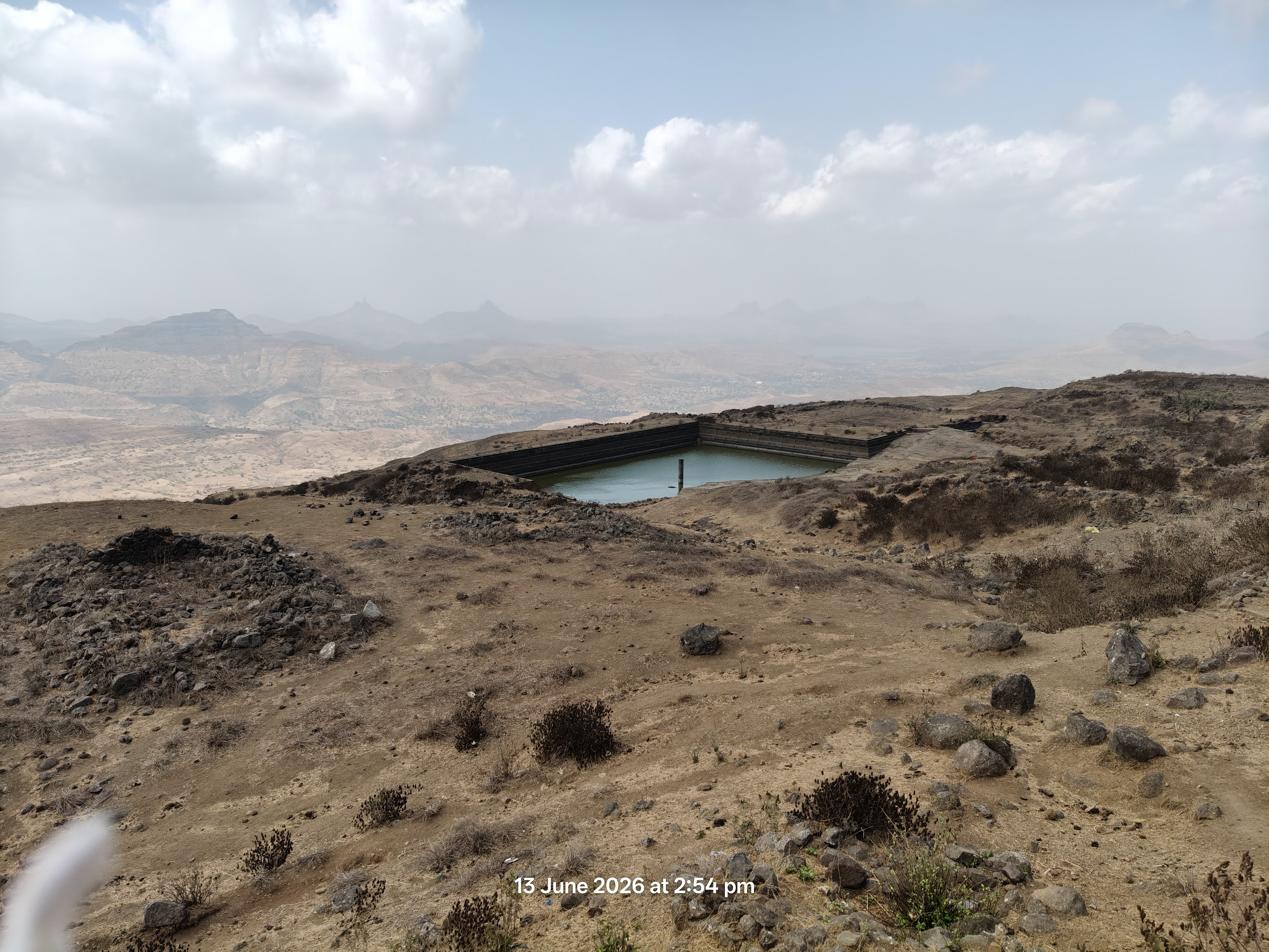
Ganga and Yamuna water tanks (View 1)

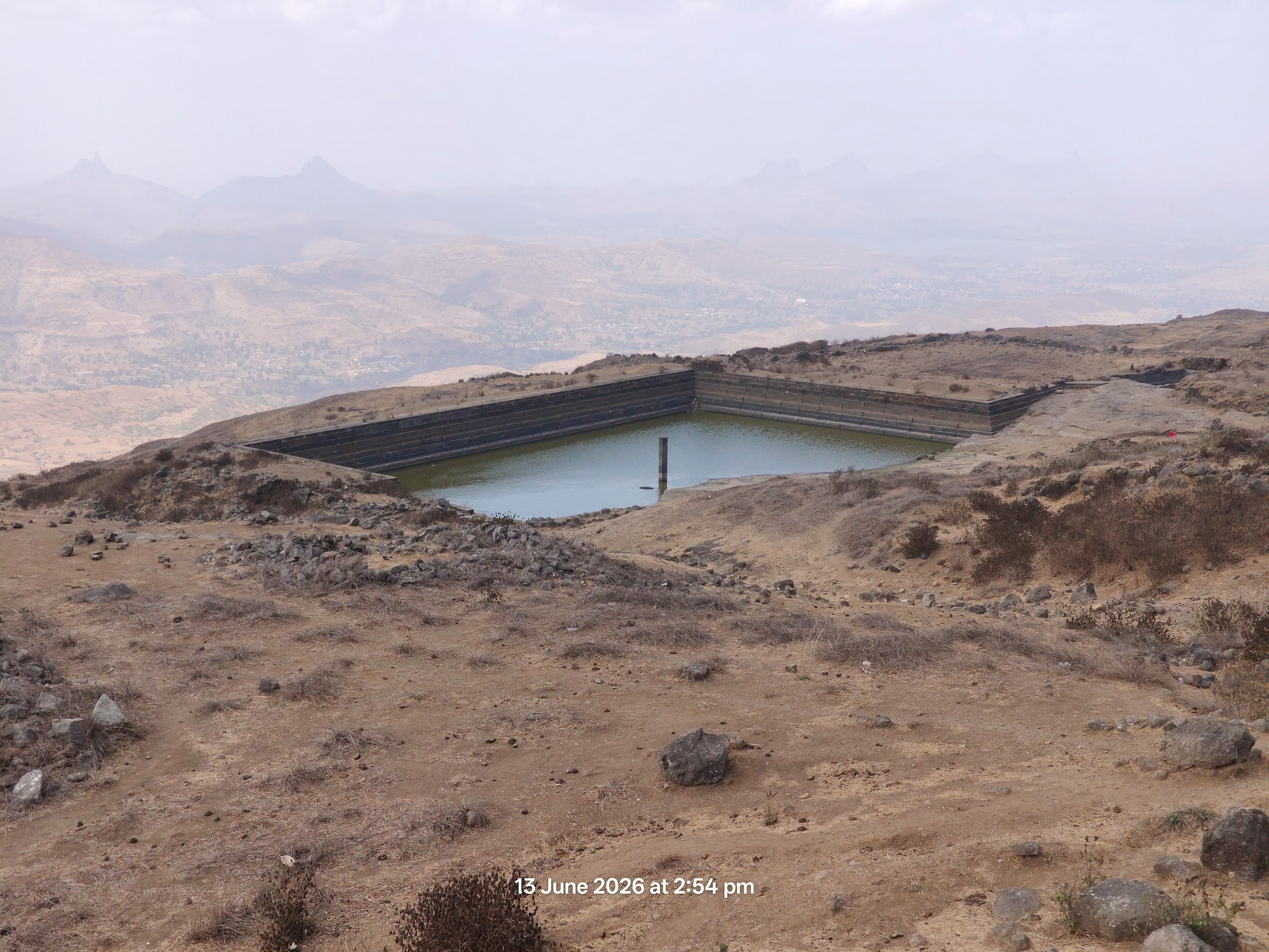
Ganga and Yamuna water tanks (View 2)

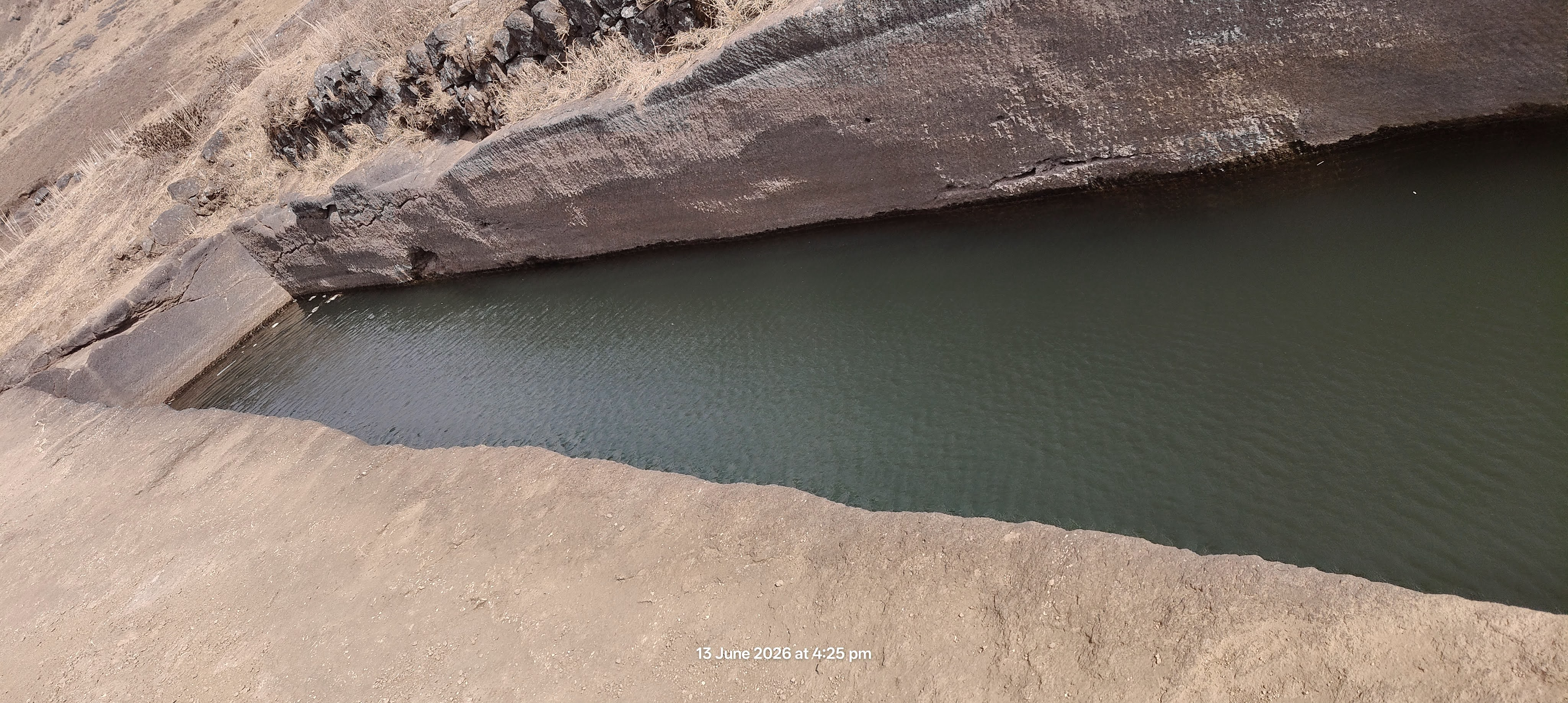
Ganga and Yamuna water tanks (View 3)
