= Greater Nashik Metro =

Proposed rapid transit system in the Indian city of Nashik

Overview
- Owner: Maharashtra Metro Rail Corporation Limited
- Area served: Nashik
- Locale: Nashik, Maharashtra, India
- Transit type: Rapid Transit
- Number of lines: 2
- Number of stations: Total 30; 20 (line 1); 10 (line 2)
- Annual ridership: 70,000-90,000
- Chief executive: Dr Deen Dayal Sharma
- Website: http://www.mahametro.org/

Operation
- Operation will start: Unknown
- Operator: Maharashtra Metro Rail Corporation Limited (Maha Metro)
- Train length: 3 coaches

Technical
- System length: 58 km
- Track gauge: 1,435 mm (4 ft 8 1/2 in) standard gauge
- Electrification: 25 kV 50 Hz AC overhead catenary
- Average speed: 33 km/h
- Top speed: 90 km/h

The Greater Nashik Metro is a proposed rapid transit network in the Nashik Metropolitan Region. Designed to ease traffic congestion, the system will connect Nashik with surrounding suburbs and nodes such as Deolali, Nashik Road, Upnagar, Nashik Airport, Sinnar, Igatpuri, Gangapur Road, Trimbakeshwar, Dindori, Bhagur, Niphad, Adgaon, Ghoti Budruk, and Girnare.

The project was originally conceived as a 32 km (20 mi) Metro Neo electric trolleybus system across two lines with an estimated budget of ₹2,000 crore. However, following updated traffic studies, Maha Metro revised the blueprint in mid-2026 to evaluate a larger 58 km (36 mi) light metro network.

The project is implemented by the Maharashtra Metro Rail Corporation Limited (Maha Metro) in collaboration with the central and state governments, the Nashik Metropolitan Region Development Authority (NMRDA), and the Nashik Municipal Corporation.

== Route ==
Greater Nashik metro or Metro NEO route diagram

== Project details (DPR) ==
=== Budget ===
The initial Maharashtra government outlay for the Metro Neo proposal was ₹2,100.6 crore, which was later expanded under the revised ₹14,520-crore light metro plan.

=== Lines ===
- Line 1: Spans 22.5 km (14.0 mi) from Shramik Nagar (Satpur) in the west to Nasik Road railway station in the east, featuring 17 stations.
- Line 2: Spans 10.5 km (6.5 mi) from Gangapur Road to Mumbai Naka, featuring 10 stations.

=== Depots and Interchange ===
- Depot: Proposed at Shramik Nagar.
- Interchange stations: Proposed at Central Bus Station (CBS) and Gangapur Road.

== Status updates ==
- August 2019: The Maharashtra state government approved the Nashik Metro project.
- June 2020: The Detailed Project Report (DPR) was submitted to the Central Government for approval.
- November 2020: The DPR received approval from the Central Government.
- January 2021: Union Finance Minister Nirmala Sitharaman allocated ₹2,092 crore for the project in the Union Budget.
- March 2025: Following delays, Maha Metro sought renewed consultations with the Central Government regarding project implementation.
- January 2026: Traffic surveys conducted by Maha Metro indicated ridership exceeding the threshold of 20,000 passengers per hour per direction, paving the way for a conventional light metro system instead of Metro Neo.

== See also ==
- Urban rail transit in India
- Nagpur Metro
- Pune Metro
- Metrolite
