= Harihar fort =

Hillfort in Maharashtra, India

Harshagad
- Part of Trymbak Range
- Trimbakeshwar tehsil, Nashik district, Maharashtra, India
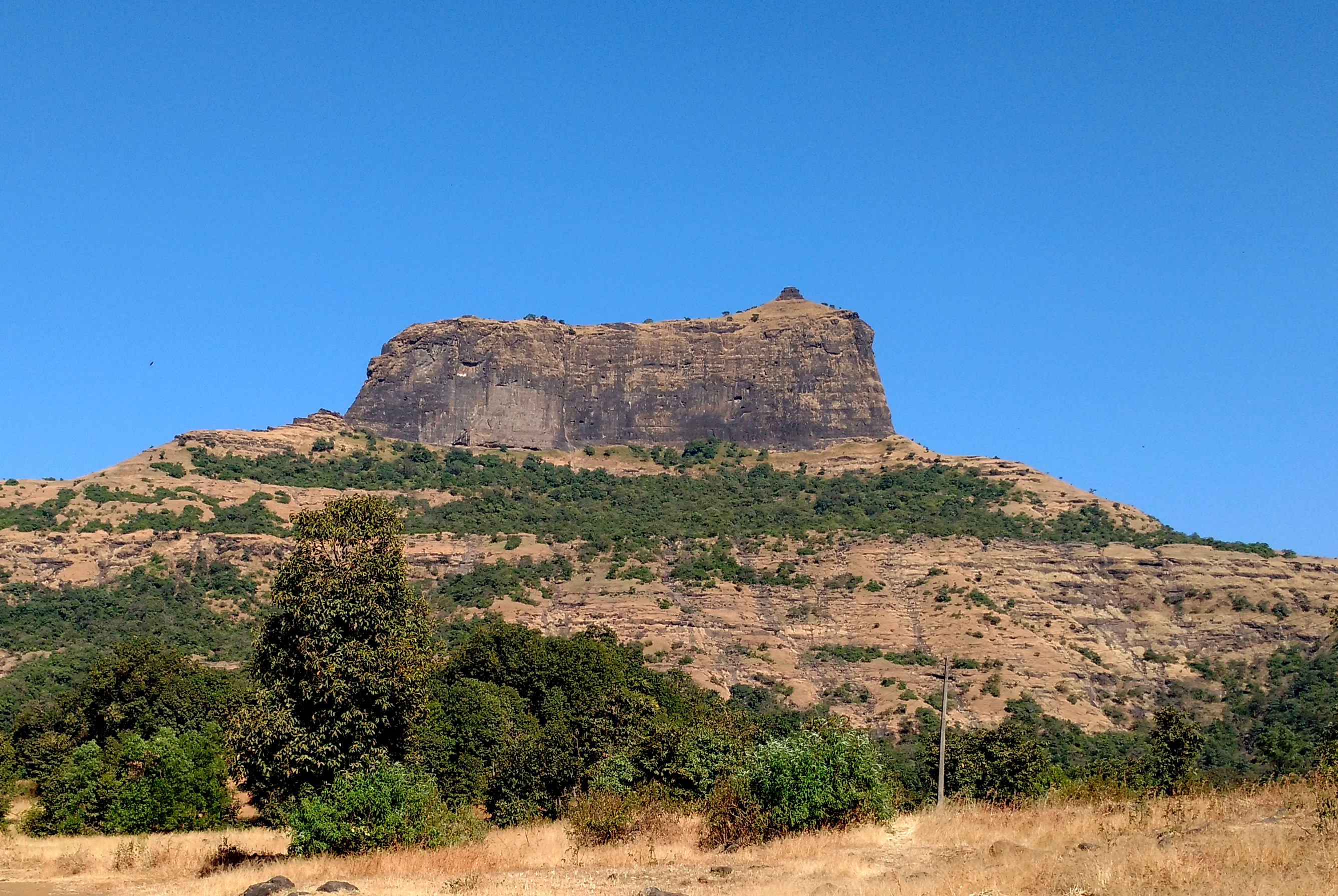
- Harihar fort from Kotamwadi

Site information
- Type: Hillfort
- Open to the public: Yes
- Condition: Ruins

Location
- Shown within Maharashtra
- Location within Maharashtra
- Coordinates: 19°54′17.9″N 73°28′19.2″E
- Height: 3,676 feet (1,120 m)

Site history
- Materials: Stone; brick; alkali

Harihar fort (also known as Harshagad) is a hillfort located about 40 kilometres (25 mi) from Nashik, 48 kilometres (30 mi) from Igatpuri, and 40 kilometres (25 mi) from Ghoti Budruk, in the Nashik district of Maharashtra, India. It receives a high number of visitors due to its peculiar rock-cut steps.

== History ==
Harihar fort was built during the Seuna period. It was surrendered to Khan Zamam in 1636, along with Trymbakgad and other Pune forts. It was captured by John Briggs in 1818, together with 17 other forts.

== Features ==
Harihar fort includes a set of rock-cut water cisterns. There are rock-cut steps leading to a narrow entrance, which have become a tourist draw in recent years.

== Gallery ==
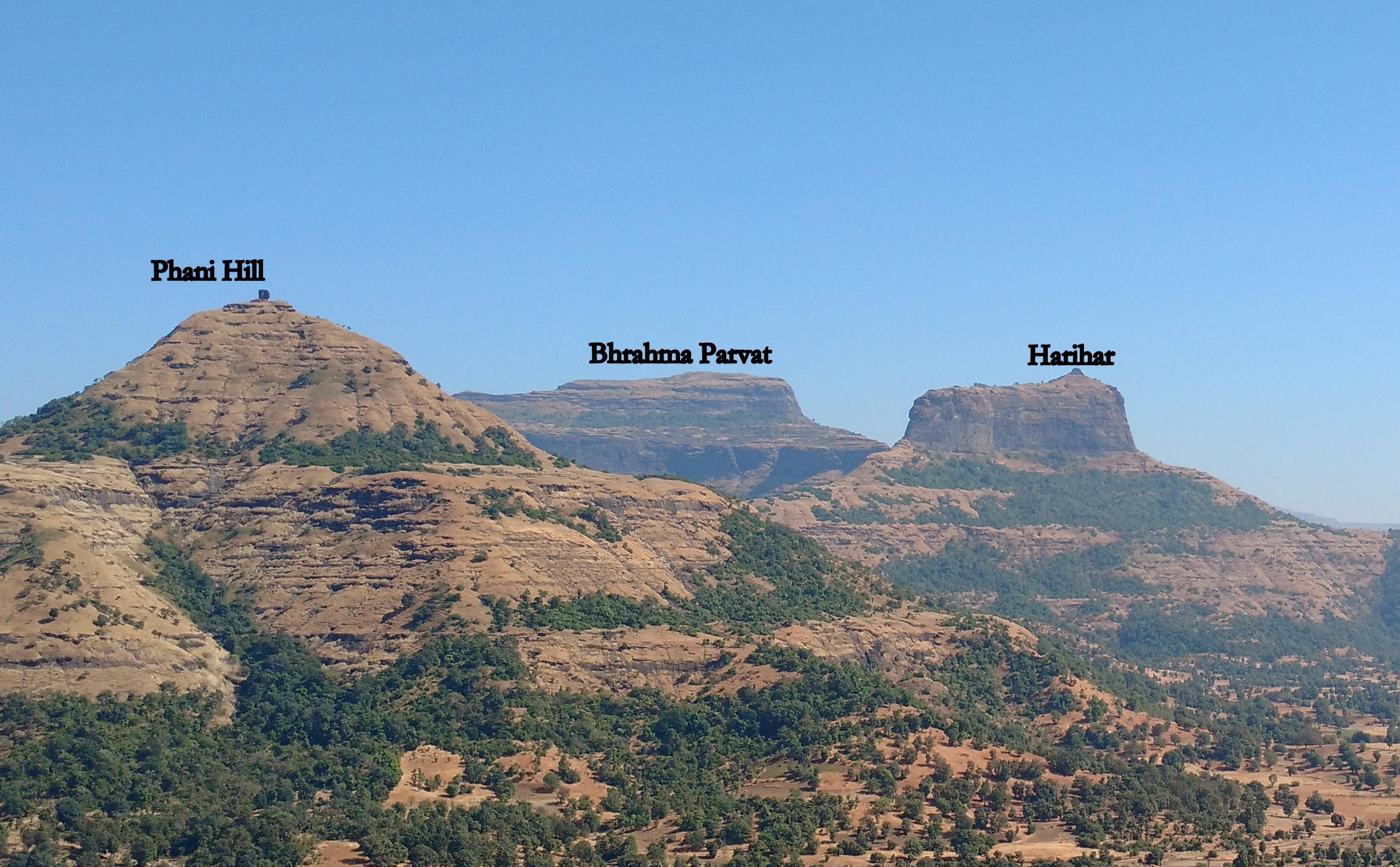
Hills around Harihar fort

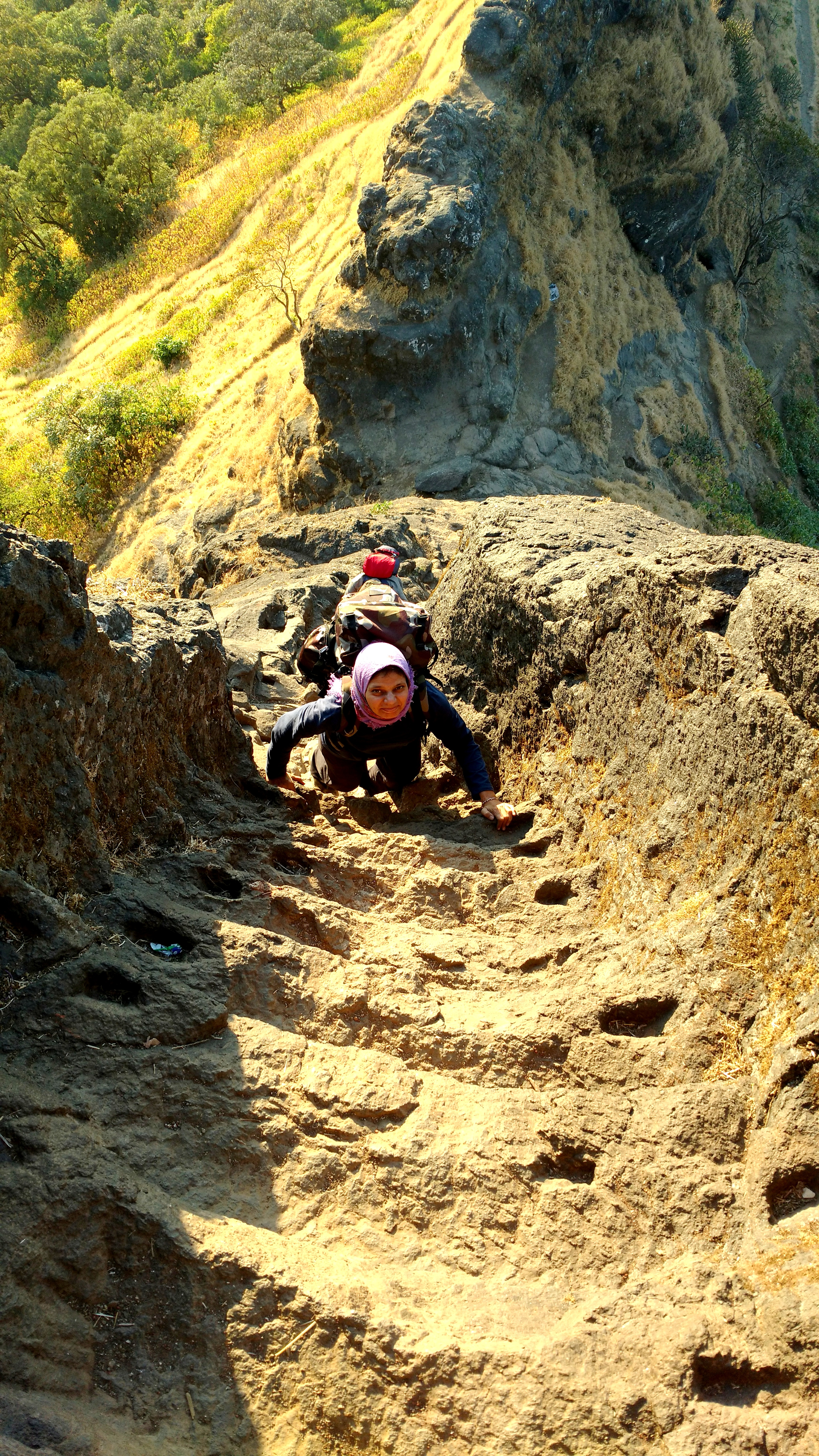
The climb

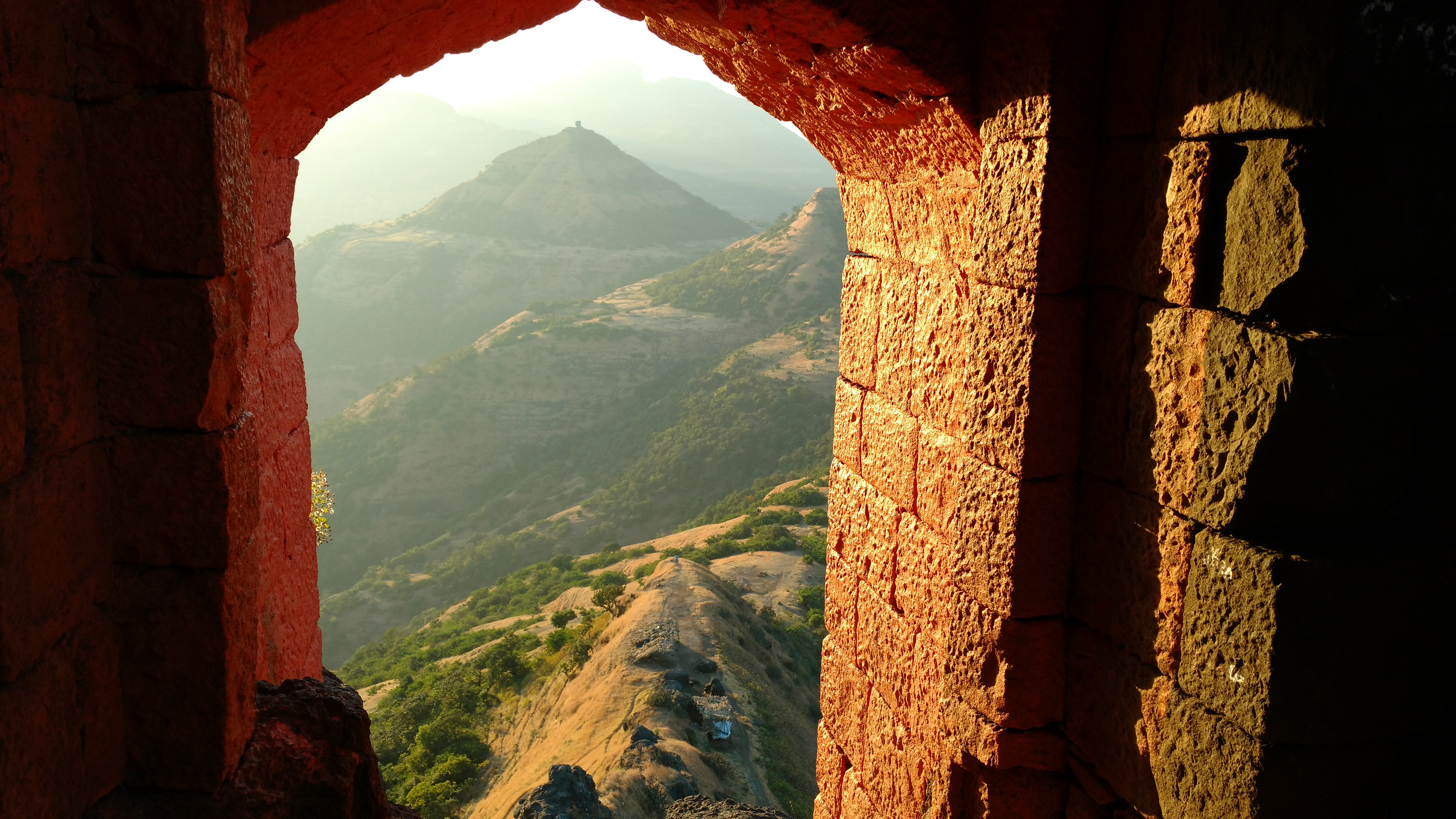
Main gate

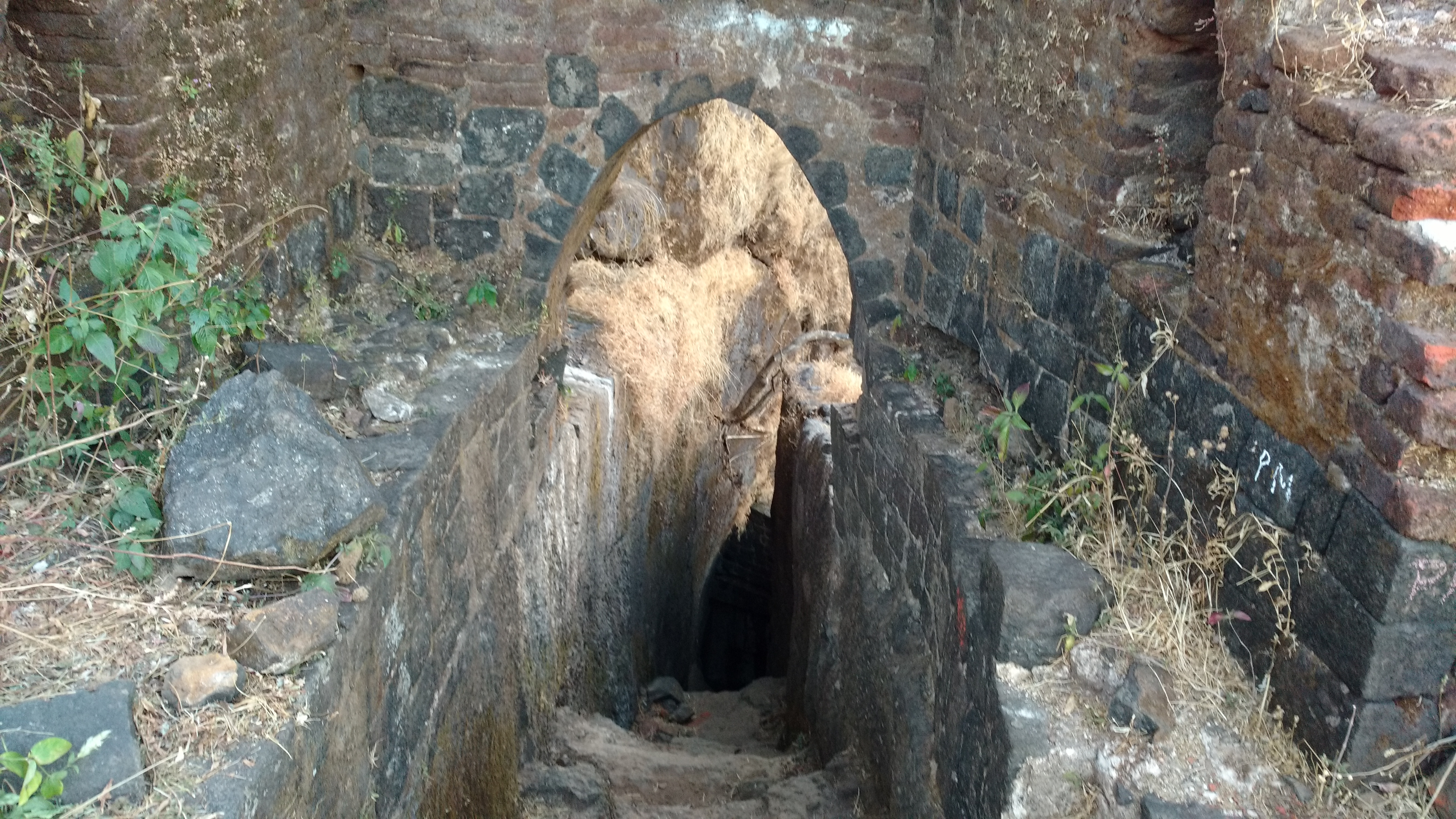
Second entrance

== See also ==
- List of forts in Maharashtra
- List of forts in India
- Military history of India
