= Oshiwara District Centre =

Land developed by Mumbai Metropolitan Region Development Authority

Agency overview
- Jurisdiction: Government of Maharashtra

Oshiwara District Centre , commonly abbreviated as ODC, is 160 acres of land developed by Mumbai Metropolitan Region Development Authority (MMRDA), strategically located between Andheri and Goregaon. It is a planned development and an emerging growth centre, commercially as well as residentially.

== History ==
MMRDA (MMRDA) wanted to set up a district centre in the suburbs as the city inched northwards. The Eastern Suburbs already had a cluster development in (Powai), but the Western Suburbs lacked a flourishing development. Therefore, MMRDA decided to plan ‘’Oshiwara District Centre’’ as the next planned development as it had all the required aspects to make it a successful District Centre. Oshiwara District Centre (ODC) is well connected to arterial roads such as Link Road, S.V. Road, and Western Express Highway. It is at a reasonable distance from the upcoming Metro Line (Dahisar-Charkop-Bandra-Mankhurd). Many hotels, offices and shopping malls are in the vicinity. Premium Hotels like The Westin, Grand Sarovar Premiere, and Orritel West are located in the vicinity. Popular malls such as Oberoi Mall at Goregaon and Infiniti Mall at Andheri are closest to ODC.

== See also ==
- Mumbai Metropolitan Region Development Authority
