= Nashik Metropolitan Region Development Authority =

Indian government agency

Nashik Metropolitan Region Development Authority (NMRDA)
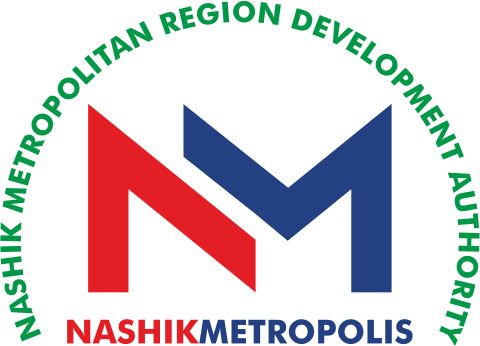

Agency overview
- Formed: 12 January 2018; 8 years ago
- Type: Urban Planning Agency
- Jurisdiction: Nashik Metropolitan Region
- Headquarters: Second Floor, Divisional Commissioner Office Campus, Nashik Road, Nashik, 422101
- Minister responsible: Eknath Shinde, Minister for Urban Development
- Agency executive: Radhakrishna Game, Metropolitan Commissioner
- Website: https://nashikmrda.in/

The Nashik Metropolitan Region Development Authority (NMRDA) is the planning and development authority for the Nashik Metropolitan Region. It was notified in the year 2018, making an urban unit in Maharashtra.

NMRDA covers Nashik city and all Talukas of Nashik: Niphad, Sinnar, Dindori, Igatpuri and Trimbakeshwar. NMRDA has been set up as a legally empowered and a self-financing corporate body by the Urban Development Department of the Government of Maharashtra.

== See also ==
- Mumbai Metropolitan Region Development Authority
- Pune Metropolitan Region Development Authority
- Nagpur Metropolitan Region Development Authority
