= Mukane Dam =

- Location within Maharashtra
- Official name: Mukane Dam D02988
- Location: Igatpuri
- Coordinates: 19.8143122°N 73.6431172°E
- Opening date: 1995
- Owners: Government of Maharashtra, India

Dam and spillways
- Type of dam: Earthfill
- Impounds: Aundha River
- Height: 26.93 m (88.4 ft)
- Length: 1,530 m (5,020 ft)
- Dam volume: 2,271 km^{3} (545 cu mi)

Reservoir
- Total capacity: 203,970 km^{3} (48,940 cu mi)
- Surface area: 3,018 km^{2} (1,165 sq mi)

Mukane Dam, is an earthfill dam on the Aaundha river near Igatpuri, Nashik district in the state of Maharashtra in India.

== Specifications ==
The height of the dam above lowest foundation is 26.93 m (88.4 ft) while the length is 1,530 m (5,020 ft). The volume content is 2,271 km^{3} (545 cu mi) and gross storage capacity is 214,160.00 km^{3} (51,379.72 cu mi).

== Purpose ==
- Irrigation
- industrial purposes

== See also ==
- Dams in Maharashtra
- List of reservoirs and dams in India
