= Datyane =

- town
- Location in Maharashtra, India
- Coordinates: 20°4′48″N 73°58′41″E
- Country: India
- State: Maharashtra
- District: Nashik

Languages
  - Official: Marathi
- Time zone: UTC+5:30 (IST)

Datyane is a village in the Niphad taluka, Nashik district of Maharashtra, India, situated on the river Banganga and on the Ozar-Kasabe Sukena connecting road. It shares borders with Narayangaon (Kherawadi) to the south, Shirasgaon to the north, Dixi and Ozar to the west and Oney and Theragaon .The Famous place is Lord Shiva Temple

== Economy ==
The population of this farming community is slightly over 3000. The village itself has 1,285 people (Male: 679, Female: 606). Major crops include grapes, sugarcane, onions, vegetables, wheat, jwar, bajra, ground nuts, and pulses, and villagers work in other vineyards in the area. Water is plentiful: farmers have access to irrigation supported by Kolhapur-type bunds and wells and the Gangapur, Maharashtra left canal. A few of the larger farmers also use irrigation siphons. The village is near both of the taluka's sugar factories and the Hindustan Aeronautics Limited plant in Ozar.

Schools are the Gram Panchayat primary school and the Maratha Vidyaprasarak Samaj high school.
