= Velunje =

Village in Maharashtra

Velunje (Welunje) is a large village located in Trimbakeshwar of Nashik district, Maharashtra, India.

Welunje village has lower literacy rate compared to Maharashtra. In 2011, literacy rate of Welunje village was 66.53% compared to 82.34% of Maharashtra. In Welunje, male literacy stands at 75.61% while female literacy rate was 57.10%.

As per constitution of India and Panchyati Raaj Act, Welunje village is administrated by Sarpanch (Head of Village) who is elected representative of village.
