= Dugarwadi waterfall =

Coordinates: 19.9406°N 73.4684°E

- Location: Nashik, Maharashtra State, India
- Watercourse: Godavari River

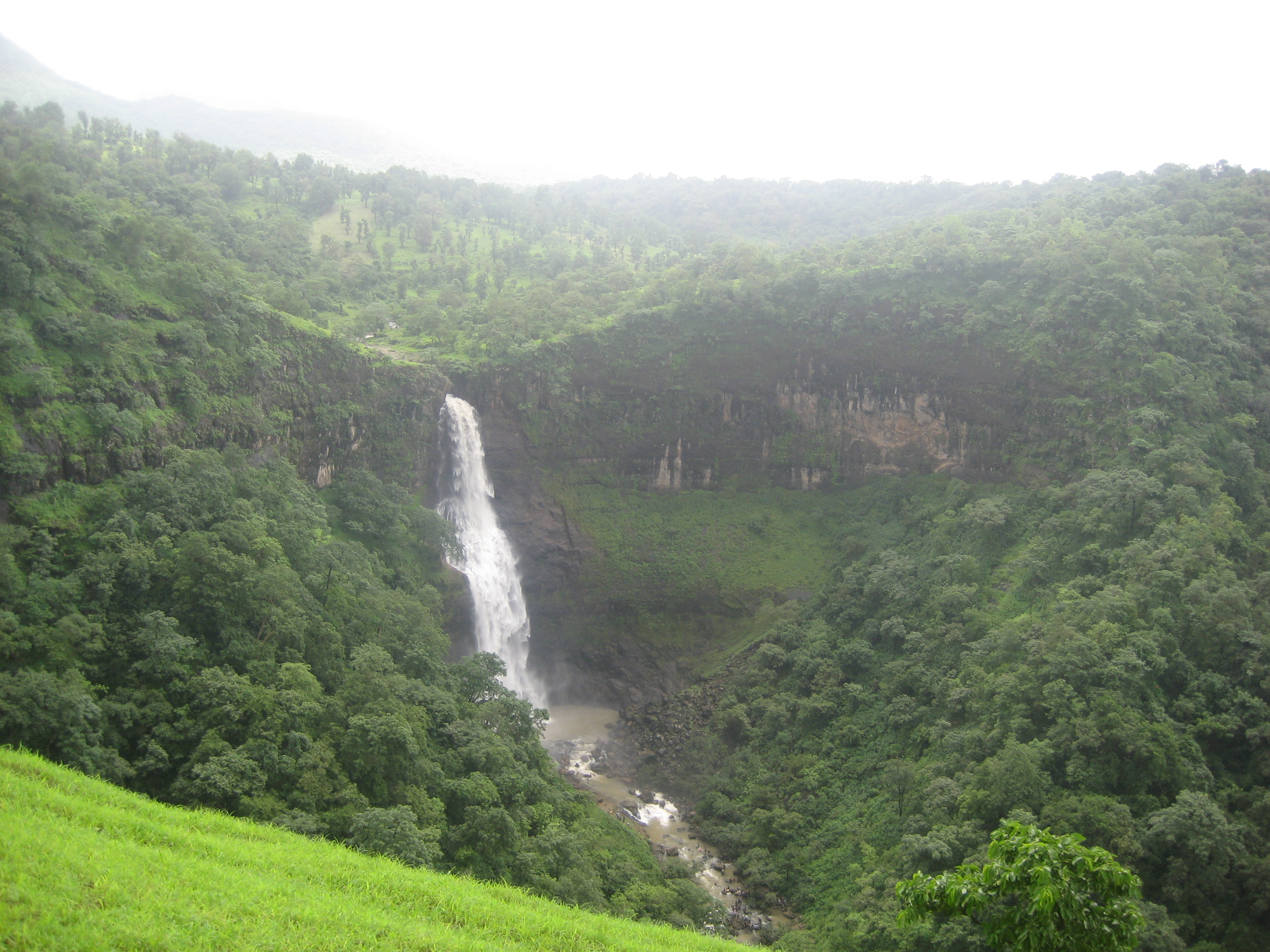
Dugarwadi waterfall, Nashik, Maharashtra, India

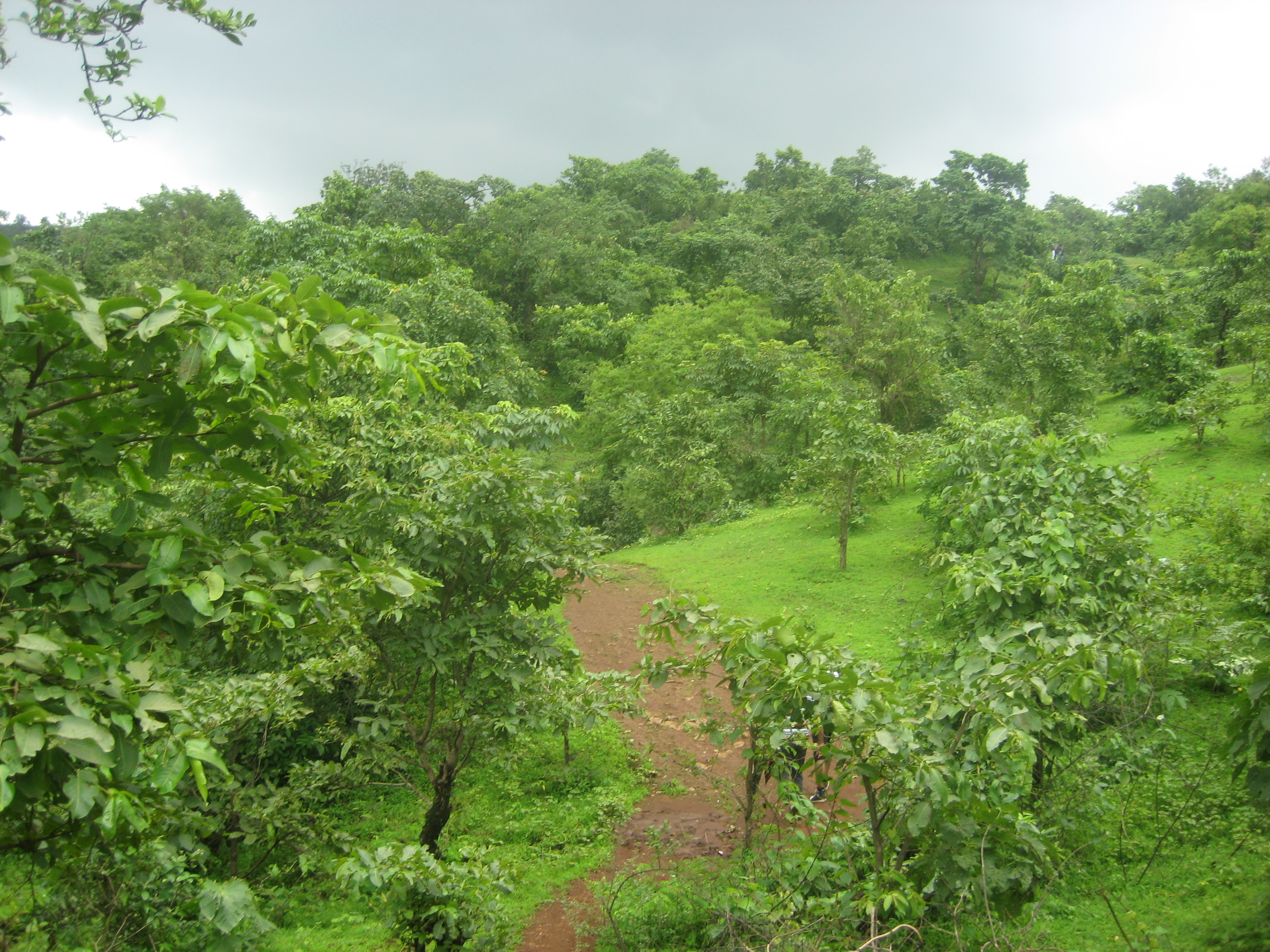
Nature_at_Dugarwadi, Nashik, Maharashtra, India

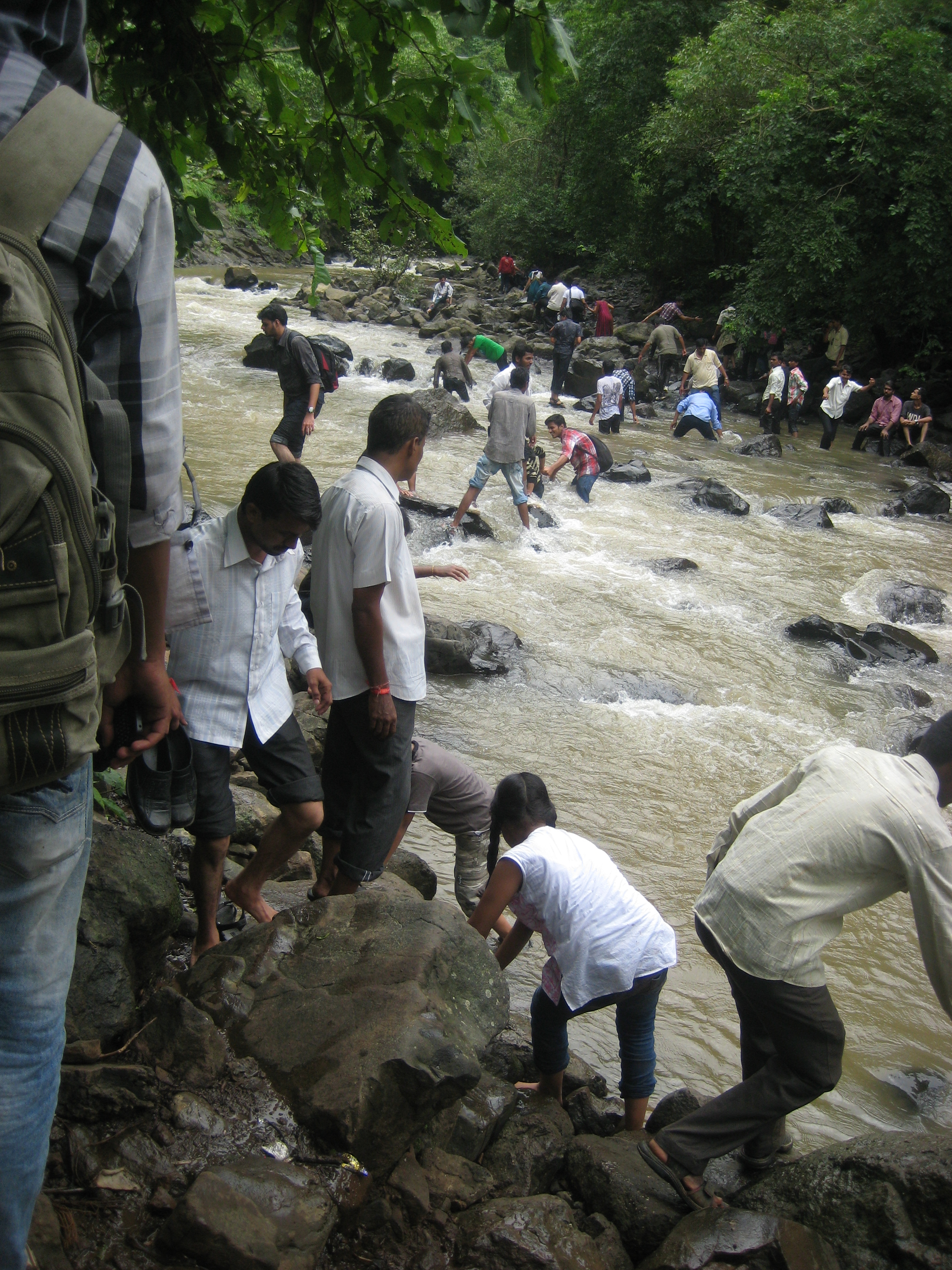
People visiting Dugarwadi waterfall in rainy season

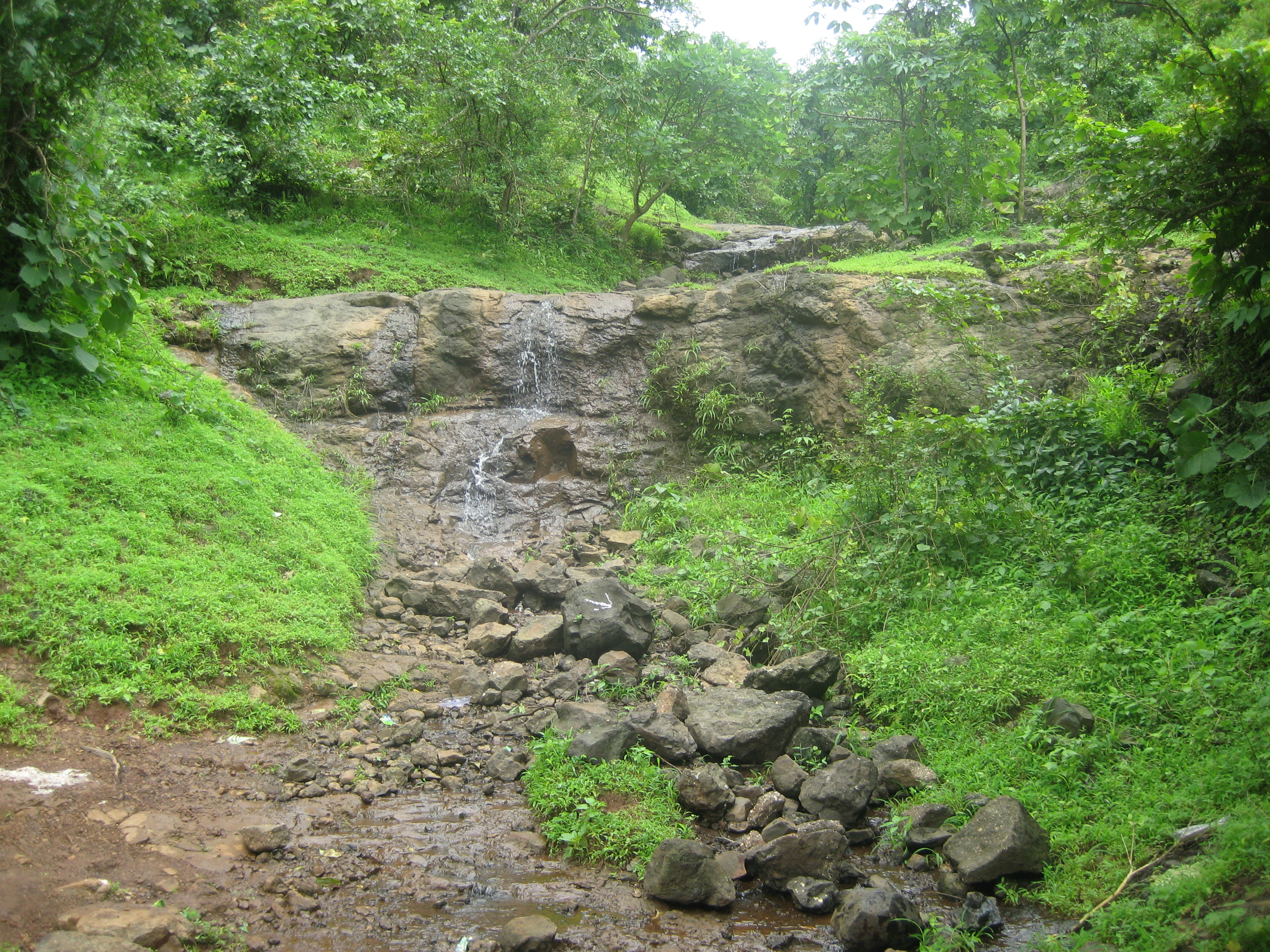
Beauty at Dugarwadi, Nashik, Maharashtra, India

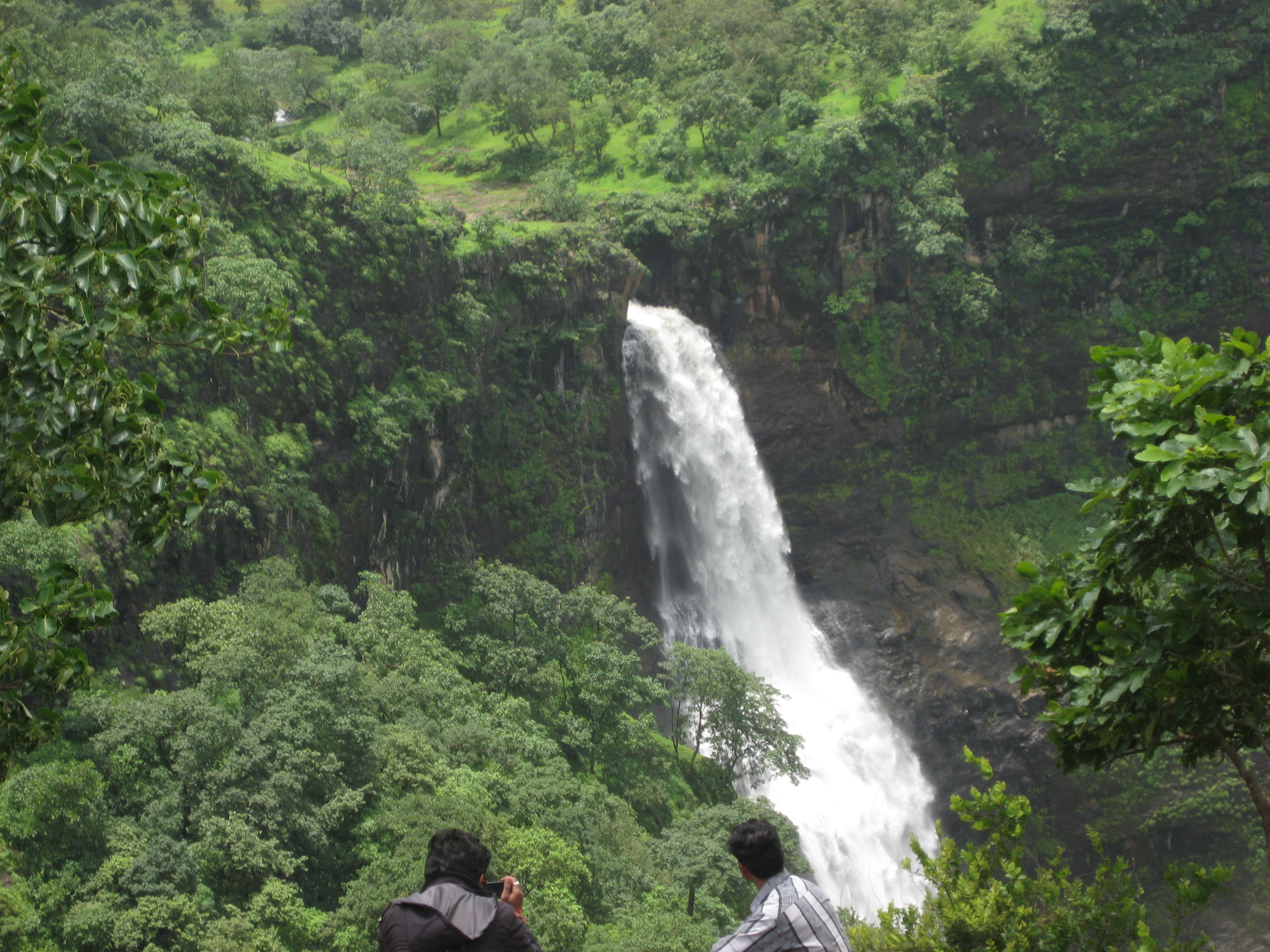
Dugarwadi waterfall

Dugarwadi waterfall is 30 kilometres (19 mi) from Nashik and around 177 kilometers (110 mi) from Mumbai on Trimbakeshwar road and 2 kilometres (1.2 mi) from the Jawhaar road.

In monsoon season, people are advised to take care as the water level suddenly rises.
