= Lake Beale =

- Location in India
- Location: Nashik District, Maharashtra, India
- Coordinates: 58.89338°N 129.10077°W
- Type: Reservoir
- Primary inflows: Darna River
- Basin countries: India

Lake Beale is a lake located in Nashik District, in Maharashtra, India. The estimate terrain elevation above sea level is 547 metres. It is a storage reservoir created in 1911 by the Darna Dam on the Darna River.
