= Nashik Airport =

International Airport in Maharashtra, India

Nashik International Airport
- IATA: ISK; ICAO: VAOZ

Summary
- Airport type: Military/Public
- Owner: Hindustan Aeronautics Limited (HAL)
- Operator: HALCON (HAL & CONCOR)
- Serves: Nashik Metropolitan Region
- Location: Ozar, Nashik district, Maharashtra, India
- Opened: 1964; 62 years ago
- Time zone: UTC+05:30 ({{{utc}}})
- Elevation AMSL: 608 m (1,995 ft)
- Coordinates: 20°07′10″N 073°54′49″E

Map
- Location of the airport in Maharashtra ISK (India)

Runways
Direction	Length		Surface
Direction	m	ft	Surface
09/27	3,000	9,843	Concrete/Asphalt

Statistics (April 2025 - March 2026)
- Passengers: 4,23,634 (▲24.2%)
- Aircraft movements: 5,141 (▲3.8%)
- Cargo tonnage: 9,442.8 (▲120.6%)
- Source: AAI

Nashik International Airport (IATA: ISK, ICAO: VAOZ) is an international airport and Indian Air Force base serving the city of Nashik, Maharashtra, India. It is located at Ozar, 20 km (12 mi) northeast from the city centre. It is owned by Hindustan Aeronautics Limited (HAL), which uses the airport primarily to develop, test and build aircraft for the Indian Armed Forces. It is home to the Indian Air Force's No. 11 Base Repair Depot, and also supports widebody commercial cargo services. A new passenger terminal was inaugurated on 3 March 2014. It serves the Nashik Metropolitan Region (NMR) as well as the North Maharashtra Region.

== History ==
The airport was built in 1964, when Hindustan Aeronautics Limited (HAL)'s Aircraft Division at Nashik commenced licensed manufacturing of fighter aircraft with the MiG-21FL. Other aircraft manufactured here include MiG-21M, MiG-21 BIS, MiG-27 M and Su-30 MKI aircraft.

Kingfisher Airlines commenced scheduled services to Mumbai in 2008, but ended in November 2009 due to poor response. HAL announced the launch of commercial air cargo operations from the airport on 20 September 2011. The cargo services are managed by HALCON, a joint working group between HAL and Container Corporation of India (CONCOR) along with Clarion Solutions. The airport is capable of handling large aircraft like the Antonov AN-124 after having creating additional parking space and medical facilities. Clarion Solutions is the cargo terminal operator.

In 2011, HAL signed a Memorandum of Understanding (MoU) with the Government of Maharashtra for an upgradation of the airport. This involves a passenger terminal worth ₹ 84 crores. The Government of Maharashtra paid ₹ 74 crores of the terminal project cost and HAL funded the remaining ₹ 10 crore. After coming on the Directorate General of Civil Aviation (DGCA)'s air map, HAL is now in the process of appointing a private company to develop, to operate and maintain the airport terminal at the airport on a revenue sharing basis. Scheduled passenger air services to Nashik was revived after a gap of eight years when Air Deccan commenced operations to Mumbai and Pune on 23 December 2017 under the government's UDAN scheme.

In March 2025, HAL announced plans to develop a new runway parallel to the existing one.

== Ozar Air Force Station ==
The 11 Base Repair Depot, one of the eight base repair depots of the Indian Air Force under overall control and supervision of the Maintenance Command, Nashik is based at the airport. It was established in 1975 and is an ISO 9001:2000 certified maintenance facility. It conducts overhaul programmes for the IAF's MiG-21 (FL, BIS), MiG-23s and MiG-29s.

== Terminal ==
The new terminal building, spread over 22 acres with 8,267 sq.m. built-up area can accommodate 300 passengers. The adjoining apron can handle up to six aircraft. The groundbreaking ceremony of the terminal was performed by the then PWD Minister and Guardian Minister, Chhagan Bhujbal, on 2 January 2012, and the terminal was inaugurated on 3 March 2014 by the then Union Minister for the Heavy Industries and Public Enterprises, Praful Patel. The facilities include departure lobby, check-in counters, security, holding and VIP areas, retail, airport administration and airlines offices, flying and ground crew services, physically challenged friendly and childcare facilities, and dedicated smoking areas. The airport boasts of modern systems like integrated baggage handling, flight information display systems (FIDS), CCTVs, public address and voice annunciation systems, access control, Building Management System (BMS), Fire and Safety Systems, and Terminal Control Center.

== Airlines and destinations ==
Airlines	Destinations
IndiGo	Ahmedabad, Bengaluru, Delhi, Goa, Hyderabad

== Cargo ==
Air cargo operations at Nashik International Airport are managed by HALCON, a joint venture between Hindustan Aeronautics Limited (HAL) and Container Corporation of India (CONCOR). The airport has emerged as a significant regional hub for international exports, particularly agricultural and pharmaceutical goods.

Between January and November 2025, the airport handled 7,155 tonnes of cargo, a 183% increase compared to the previous year.

Cargo airlines and destinations
Airlines	Destinations
Fly Vaayu	Ras Al Khaimah, Dubai

=== Export Commodities ===
Commodities exported from the facility include:

- Agriculture: Grapes, onions, and horticultural crops.
- Livestock: Poultry and live animals (supported by quarantine facilities in Ras Al Khaimah).
- Industrial and Medical: Pharmaceutical products, defense equipment, and engineering goods.

== Statistics ==
Annual passenger traffic at Nashik Airport
Financial Year	Passengers	% Change	Ref.
2022–23	107,772	—	
2023–24	242,261	▲124.8%	
2024–25	340,000	▲40.3%	
2025–26	421,887	▲24.8%	

== Future expansion ==
In preparation for the Simhastha Kumbh Mela (scheduled from October 2026 to July 2028), the Nashik-Trimbakeshwar Kumbh Mela Development Authority approved a ₹556 crore expansion project for the airport in November 2025.

The expansion plan, targeted for completion by March 2027, includes:

- A new 17,800 sqm terminal building that will increase the hourly passenger capacity from 300 to 1,000.
- A new 1.15 lakh sqm apron to accommodate additional aircraft parking.
- Adding modern passenger facilities, including aerobridges and advanced security systems.

== See also ==
- List of airports in Maharashtra
