= Pragati Aerospace Museum =

Aerospace museum in Nashik, Maharashtra, India

Coordinates: 20°06′10″N 73°56′56″E

- Established: August 2001
- Location: Ozar, Nashik District, Maharashtra, India
- Type: Aerospace museum

Pragati Aerospace Museum (also known as "Hindustan Aeronautics Limited Pragati Museum") is situated in the town of Ozar, approximately 20 km from Nashik in India. In August 2001, HAL opened this museum to showcase their technical achievements and commendable journey. Models of aircraft manufactured by HAL are kept here for display. The models are mounted on pylons.

== Museum highlights ==
The aerospace museum is divided into two rooms. One room showcases pictorial history of HAL, including flight history, fighter plane technology among others. The other room contains polished components of aircraft, including the Sukhoi Su-30, Mig-21, and Mig-27. A Mig-21 pilot's helmet and flight suit dating from 1963 are displayed here.

== Gallery ==
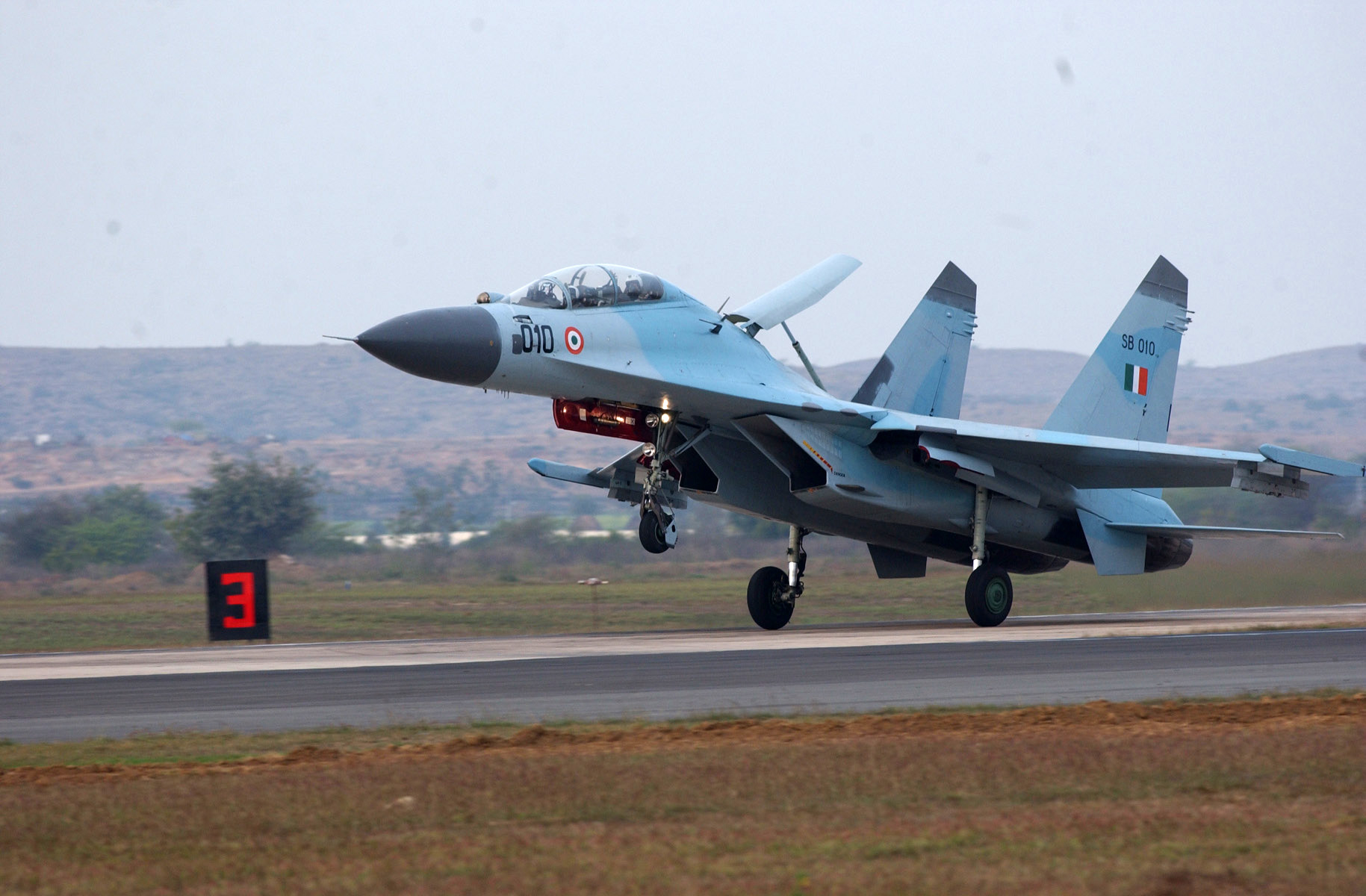
SU-30MKI India

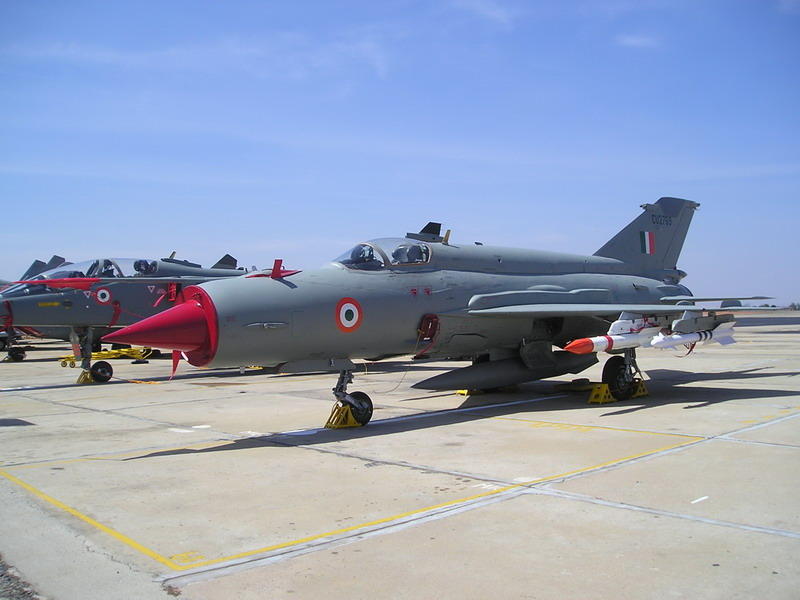
MiG-21
