= Narayan nagbali =

Hindu ritual

Narayan Nagbali is a three-day Hindu ritual performed at Trimbakeshwar in the Nashik District of Maharashtra, India. The Narayan bali ritual is performed by families to liberate souls of family members who met an untimely death and the Nag bali to absolve the sin of killing a king cobra respectively.

== Ritual ==
In practice, Narayan Nagbali Poojan comprises two separate rituals. Narayan Bali is said to enable a person get rid of an ancestral curse, which is also called as Pitru Dosha while Nag Bali is a way that enables a person to get rid of sin by killing a snake (a cobra made from wheat dough). By having Narayan Bali Pooja performed, one can satisfy the unfulfilled worldly desires of the deceased souls, which could be bothering the progeny or relatives.

Narayan Bali Poojan is similar to a funeral wherein an artificial body of wheat flour is used. By use of Mantras, souls that have desires remaining in this world are invoked. With the rituals, they are able to possess the body made using wheat flour and the funeral liberates them to the other world. Similarly, Nag Bali allows the deceased to get rid of their sins.

By having the Narayan Nagbali Poojan performed, one can get rid of problems of Bhoot Pishaach Badha, not getting success in business, health problems or lack of peace within the family, hindrances in marriage, etc.

The ritual consists of two important parts called Narayan Bali' and Nag Bali, which are performed on the first and second day respectively. The third day is reserved for a ritual called Ganesh Pujan, Punya Wachan and Nag Pujan. The 40th chapter of the Garuda Purana is dedicated to the Narayan Bali Rites. Narayan bali is a necessary ritual which is performed to relieve the dead person's soul who has undergone abnormal death whereas Nag bali is performed to get rid of the sin caused by killing a snake, especially a cobra, which is worshiped throughout India.

The ritual is performed mainly at the Hindu pilgrimage site of Trimbakeshwar in Maharashtra, India.

=== Narayan Bali Puja ===
Narayan Bali Puja is a ritual described in Garuda Purana which is performed in all cases of unnatural death of a family member. Death can be by one of the following reasons :

- Starvation
- Animals
- Accident
- Arson
- Curse
- Epidemics such as Cholera or other diseases causing untimely death
- Suicide,
- Fall from a mountain, tree or any height,
- Drowning,
- Murder
- Snake bite,
- Lightning

It is also performed for the dead persons who were great sinners. For all these people there is neither ritual for cremation, nor tarpana, nor sraddha nor asaucham. Narayan Bali consists of the same rituals as a Hindu funeral shortened to three days instead of the customary thirteen. A Brahmin priest at Timbakeshwar experienced in conducting these rituals is engaged by the family performing the ritual. Five rituals are offered to Brahma, Vishnu, Shiva, Yama and Preta. The ritual for Brahma is not known by Brahmins outside Trimbakeshwar. A dummy body mostly made of wheat dough is used. Vedic Mantras are chanted to invoke such lost souls. It is believed that the ritual makes the souls of the dead to possess the dummy body which is later set alight with the pyre supposed to let the soul to liberate and transcend.

=== Nag Bali ===
Nag bali ritual is similar to Narayan Bali.the only difference being that instead of a dummy human body, a dummy body of a snake (made of dough) is used but the purpose of both the rituals are entirely different.

== Ritual Participants ==
The families performing these rituals usually do in the hope of them getting rid of family misfortune, infertility or for the desire to have a male child. They blame the curse of the unnatural death of a family member or the killing of the king cobra for the problems faced by their family.

== Priests ==
Trimbakeshwar has around three hundred Brahmin families offering their services to conduct the ritual. Since the ritual does not involve an actual funeral, these priests are not socially shunned by other Brahmins unlike the ones who conduct funerals.
