= Station Area Traffic Improvement Scheme =

Urban mobility project

Station Area Traffic Improvement Scheme (SATIS) is a World Bank funded station area traffic improvement project. It is implemented by Mumbai Metropolitan Region Development Authority (MMRDA) and Thane Municipal Corporation. This project is executed under Mumbai Urban Transport Project road component. The project aims at easing commuter and pedestrian movement by building skywalks, foot over bridges, separate parking areas for auto-rickshaws and taxis at four crowded suburban railway stations Borivali, Dadar, Chembur and Ghatkopar implement by MMRDA and Thane SATIS is implemented by Thane Municipal Corporation. On 22 October 2022, MMRDA announced new SATIS implementation at Ambernath railway station.

== Bandra SATIS ==
Under this project, MMRDA built city's first skywalk on eastern side of Bandra Railway Station. It is 1.3 km long & four meter wide skywalk built at cost of ₹130 million (US$1.4 million). The skywalk is on the eastern side of Bandra railway station and it goes till Bandra Kurla Complex.

== Thane SATIS ==
Under this project Thane station has a completely elevated deck for TMT Buses and an elevated concourse for suburban ticket booking office. Which is connected to existing foot over bridges of Thane railway station. It is also has two skywalks on the south end and north end of the station. These foot over bridges are aligned with the elevated decks so that commuters can directly enter and exit through elevated decks and also directly connected to railway stations foot over bridges. This skywalk has been built at a cost of ₹80 million (US$850,000).
