= Ozar, Nashik District =

Ozar OZAR MIG
- town
- Location in Maharashtra, India
- Coordinates: 20.0945°N 73.9275°E
- Country: India
- State: Maharashtra
- District: Nashik

Government
  - Body: Nagar parishad

Population (2011)
  - Total: 51,297

Languages
  - Official: Marathi
- Time zone: UTC+5:30 (IST)
- Postal code: 4222XX

Ozar (also written as Ojhar or Ozhar) is a census town in Nashik District in the Indian state of Maharashtra. It is a part of Nashik Metropolitan Region. The town hosts an aircraft manufacturing unit run by Hindustan Aeronautics Limited, and 11 Base Repair Depot of the Indian Air Force's Maintenance Command. Nashik International Airport is located in Ojhar.

== Demographics ==
As of 2011 India census, Ozar had a population of 51,297. Males constitute 52% of the population and females 48%. Ozar has an average literacy rate of 78.9%, higher than the national average of 74.04%: male literacy is 82%, and female literacy is 75%. 12.35% of the population is under 6 years of age. Ozar has some major central government installations, housing an HAL aircraft manufacturing plant, and an Indian Air Force & Military Engineering Services (MES) Station. The town is famous for its vineyards, grapes, sugarcane, and onions.

Nashik Airport, also known as Ozar Airport, is situated in Ozar, with daily cargo services and domestic flights. The new terminal building, spread over 22 acres with 8,267 sq.m. built-up area, can accommodate 300 passengers. The adjoining apron can handle up to six aircraft.

The Pragati Aerospace Museum is also located in Ozar.

The town is situated on the Indian National Highway No. 3, the Mumbai Agra National highway.

In early 1920s, the tropical viticulture or table grape revolution was started in Ozar by Shri Raosaheb Jairam Krishnaji Gaikwad (1894–1980). Table grapes are exported to Europe, the Middle East and the Americas.
