= Ghoti Budruk =

Ghoti Budruk Ghotikar
- Census town
- Nickname: Rice mill town of Nashik
- Location in Maharashtra, India
- Coordinates: 19.7167°N 73.6333°E
- Country: India
- State: Maharashtra
- District: Nashik

Government
  - Type: Gram Panchayat

Area
  - Total: 5 km^{2} (1.9 sq mi)
- Elevation: 580 m (1,900 ft)

Population (2011)
  - Total: 24,838
  - Density: 5,000/km^{2} (13,000/sq mi)

Languages
  - Official: Marathi
- Time zone: UTC+5:30 (IST)
- Postal code: 422402
- Vehicle registration: MH15

Ghoti Budruk is a census town in Nashik district in the Indian state of Maharashtra.It is a special growth center in Nashik Metropolitan Region.Ghoti Budruk, khambale and Dahalewadi together forms a Growth Center.It is the biggest town and market place in Igatpuri.It is also called as mini Mumbai. It is situated on the bank of Darna River. This small town is having largest number of hospitals in Igatpuri. So it is also called as town of hospitals and medicals. Average rainfall of the town per year is 2998mm.

== Demographics ==
As of 2001 India census, Ghoti Budruk had a population of 20,204. Males constitute 52% of the population and females 48%. Ghoti Budruk has an average literacy rate of 70%, higher than the national average of 59.5%: male literacy is 77%, and female literacy is 62%. In Ghoti Budruk, 16% of the population is under 6 years of age.

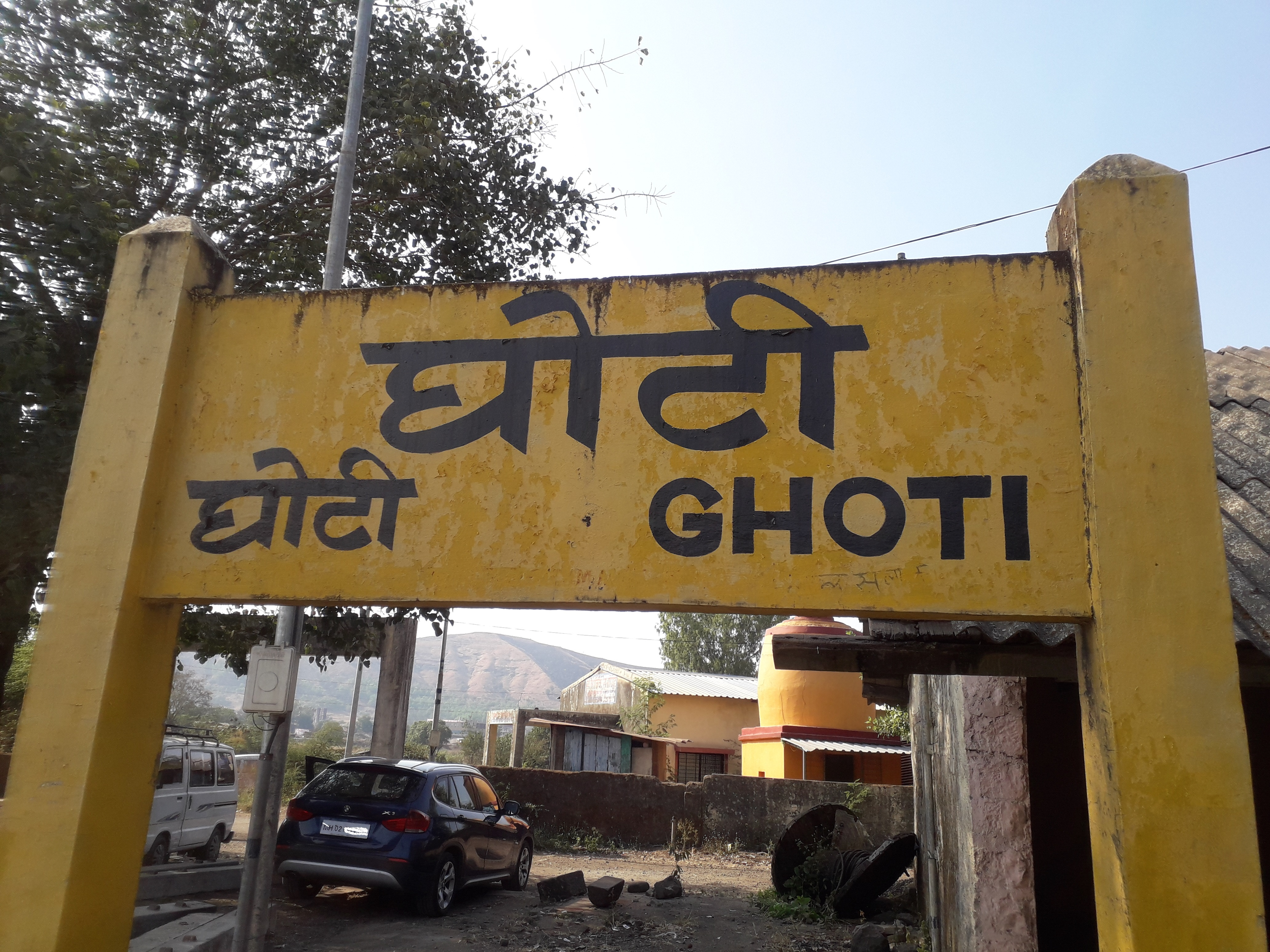
Ghoti railway station - Station board

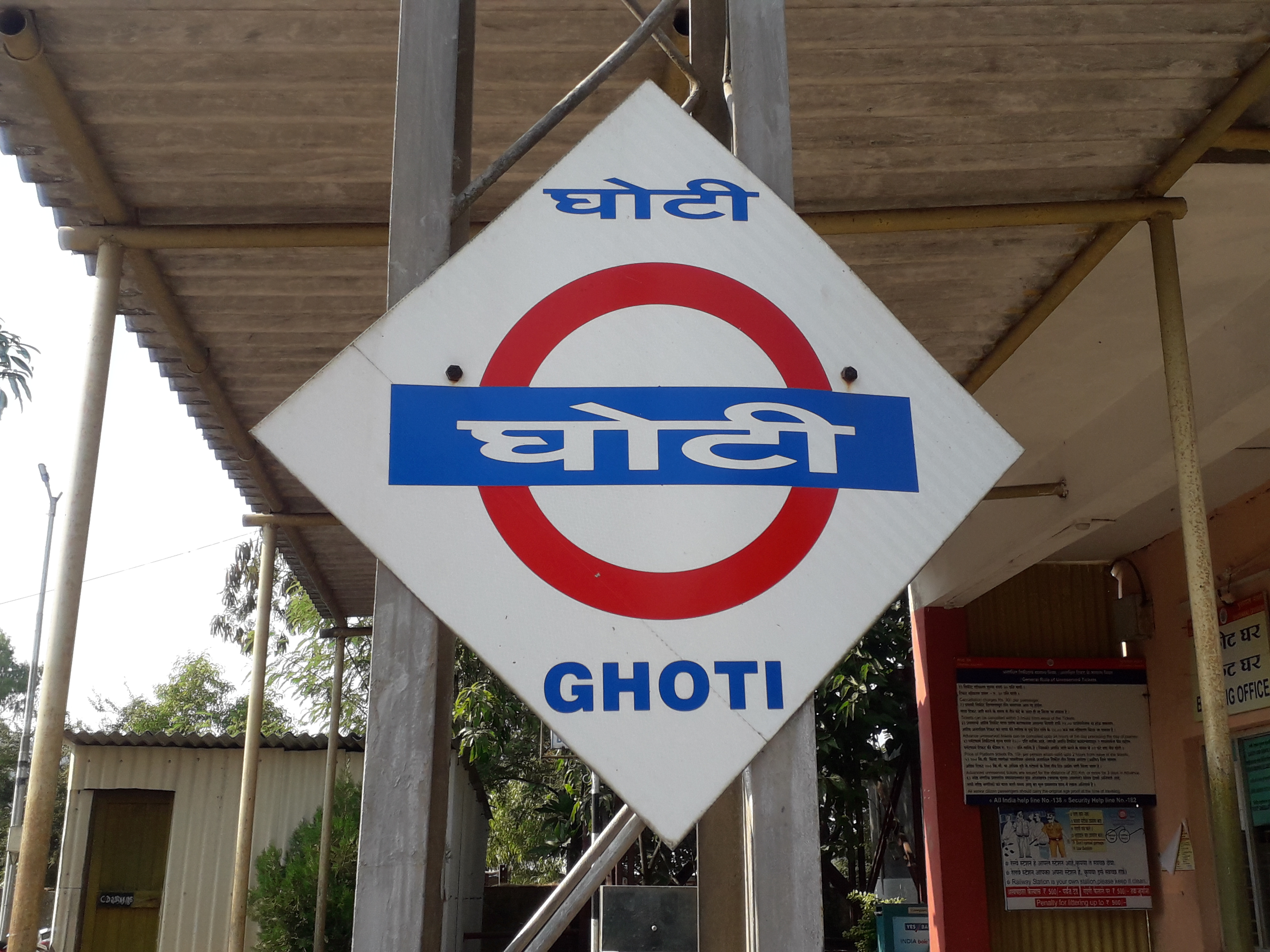
Ghoti railway station - Platform board

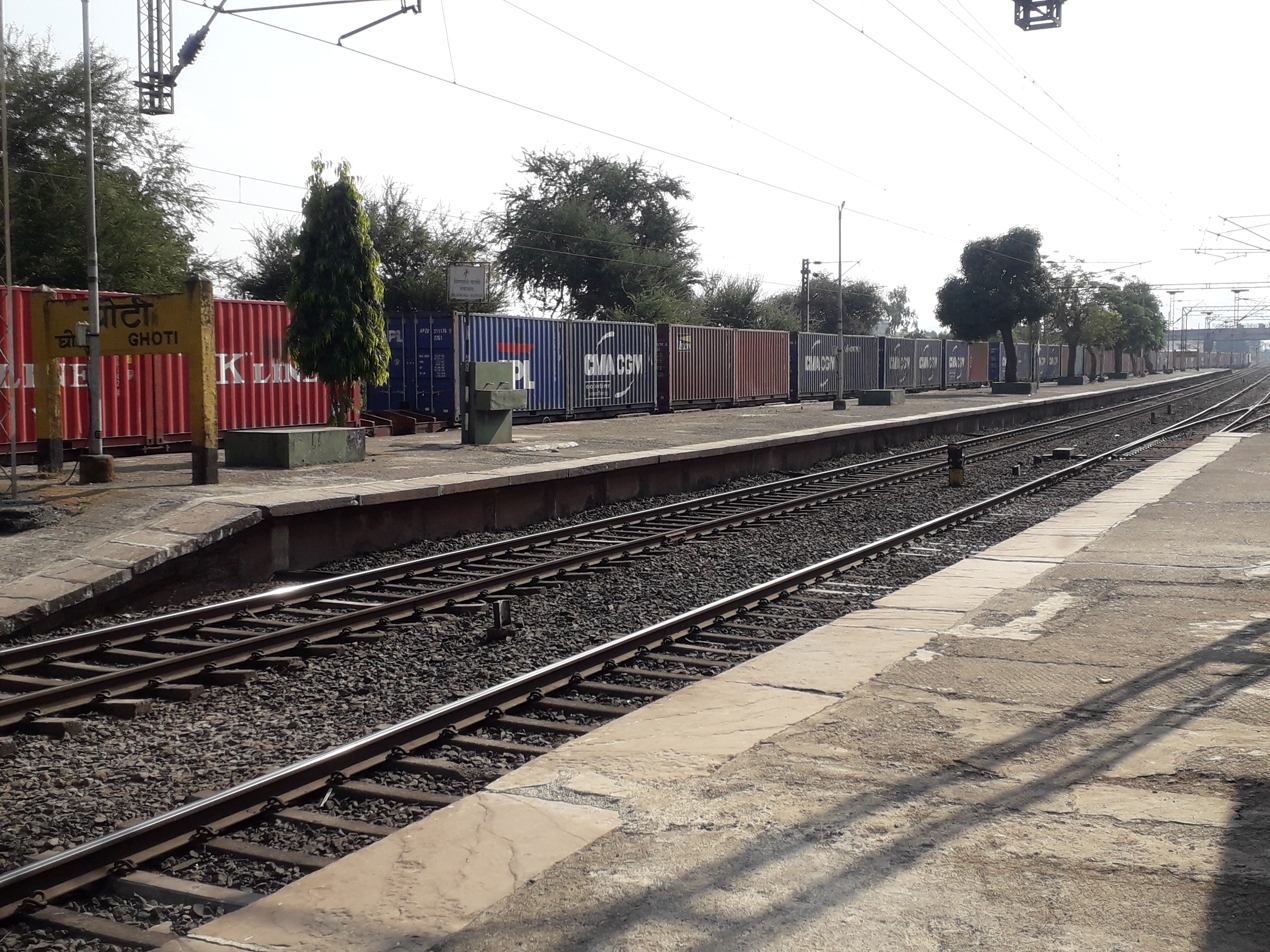
Ghoti railway station -Overview
