= Mumbai Skywalk Project =

Series of skyways

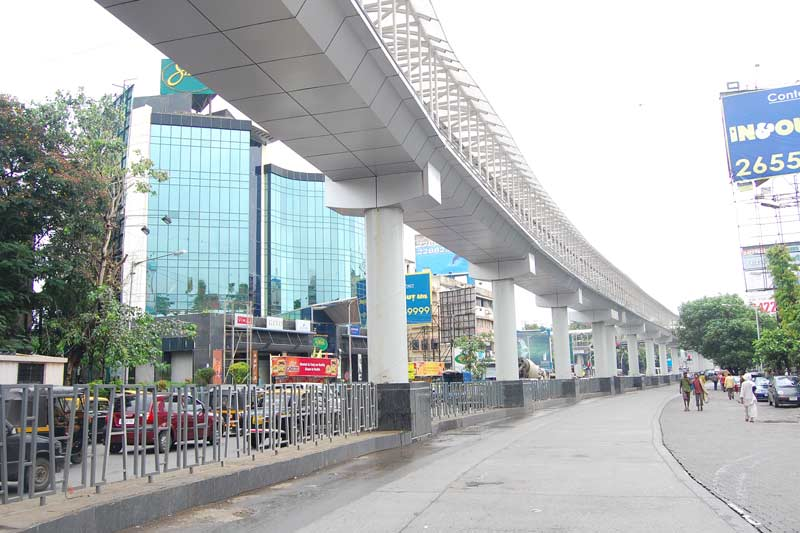

Overview
- Owner: MMRDA, MSRDC
- Locale: Mumbai Metropolitan Region, India
- Transit type: Footbridge
- Number of lines: 37
- Daily ridership: 565,000 daily (August 2010)

Operation
- Began operation: 24 June 2008

The Mumbai Skywalk Project is a series of pedestrian skyways in the Mumbai Metropolitan Region. The skywalks connect Mumbai Suburban Railway stations and other high-concentration commercial areas with various destinations. The purpose of the skywalks is efficient dispersal of commuters from congested areas to strategic locations, such as bus stations, taxi stands, shopping areas, etc. and vice versa.

The first skywalk was inaugurated on 24 June 2008. There are 36 skywalks in the Mumbai Metropolitan Region. The average daily foot count for 23 skywalks in August 2010 was estimated at 565,000.

== History ==
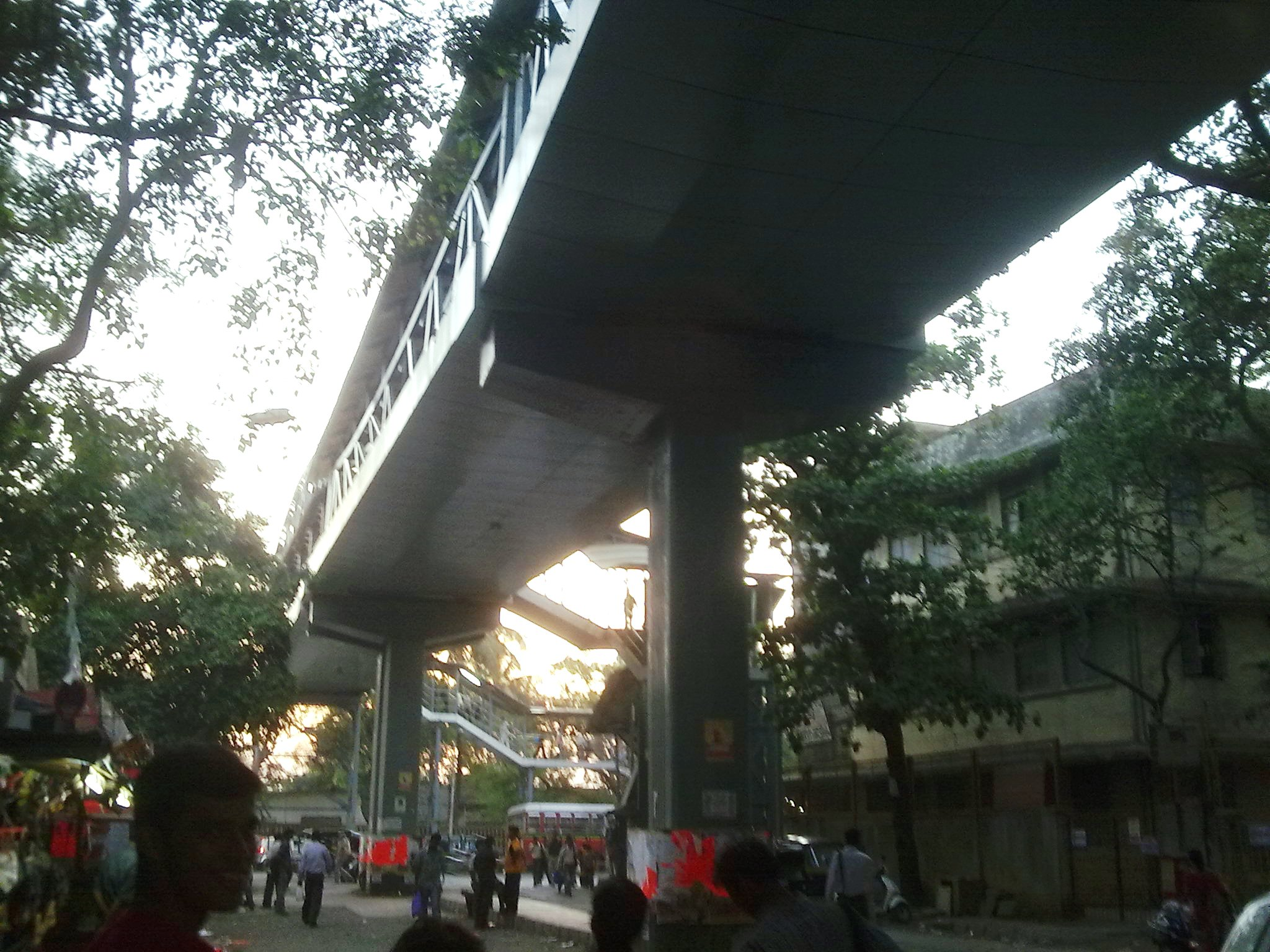
Vile-Parle-Skywalk

Mumbai's Suburban Railway has one of the highest passenger densities of any urban railway system in the world. With almost 7 million passengers using the system daily, as well as the associated transport interchanges in their vicinity (bus stations, taxi stands, autorickshaw stands, car parks, etc.) the areas around the suburban railway stations are the most congested in the city. The problem is further aggravated by the presence of hawkers and parked vehicles, making the commute hazardous for pedestrians. The skyways were constructed to reduce risk to pedestrians.

MMRDA planned to build 50 skywalks in the first phase, ranging from 1 to 2 miles in length. The first 18 skywalks were to be built by the Maharashtra State Road Development Corporation (MSRDC). Following feedback and criticism of some of the skywalks based on the proposed routes or other conflicting development plans, 17 of these were cancelled and others added.

The first phase of Mumbai Skywalks consisting of 50 skywalks was expected to cost about ₹6.0721 billion (US$60 million). The proposed Mahim East skywalk was challenged by the Mahim Skywalk Protest Committee. MMRDA announced in June 2009 that it was cancelling the proposed Mahim East skywalk due to "alignment conflicts with the Dharavi Redevelopment Project."

The first Skywalk was completed in June 2008 from Bandra station to Kalanagar Junction, measuring 1.3 km. It is used by over 100,000 pedestrians daily. As of 2024, both Bandra east and Bandra West skywalks have been demolished.

MMRDA recovered some of the cost of maintenance through the sale of advertising space on the walkways.

== Skywalks ==
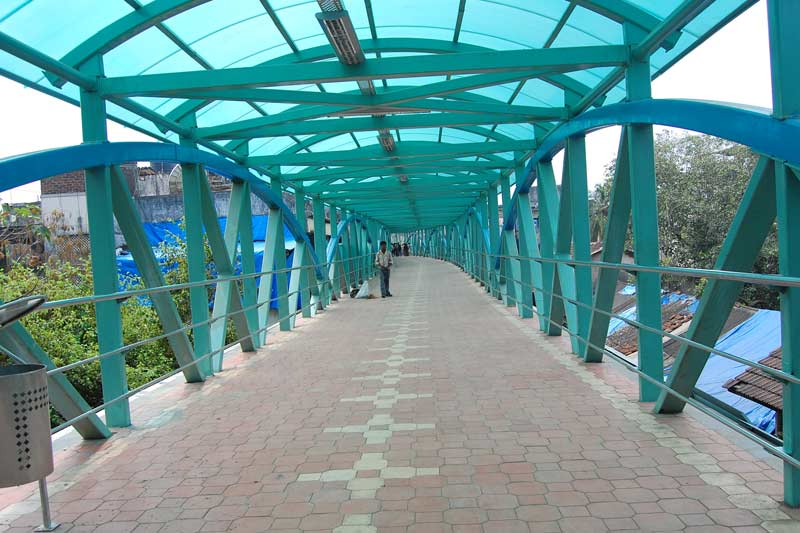
Vasai Skywalk Inside View

There are currently 37 skywalks in Mumbai Metropolitan Region.

S. No.	Location	Length (m)
1	Ambarnath (W)	350
2	Andheri (E)	581
3	Bandra (E) Court	494
4	Bandra (E) – Kalanagar	970
5	Bandra (W)	864
6	Badlapur (E)	449.12
7	Badlapur (W)	391.5
8	Bhandup (W)	465
9	Bhayandar (W)	225
10	Borivali (W)	1395
11	Chembur	323
12	Cotton Green	385
13	Dahisar (E)	410
14	Dahisar (W)	850
15	Dombivli (W)	
16	Dombivli (E)	
17	Goregaon (W)	625
18	Ghatkopar (W)	315
19	Grant Road	650
20	Kalyan (E)	637
21	Kalyan (W)	1287
22	Kandivali (E)	1025
23	Kanjurmarg (E)	222
24	Mira Road (E)	525
25	Santacruz (E)	685
26	Santacruz (W)	438
27	Sion	1041
28	Thane (E)	1350
29	Thane (W)	
30	Ulhasnagar (E)	445
31	Ulhasnagar (W)	890
32	Vasai Road (W)	615
33	Vidyavihar (E)	191
34	Vidyavihar (W)	149
35	Vikhroli (W)	440
36	Vile Parle (W)	460
37	Virar (E)	285
38	Virar (W)	630
39	Wadala	750
40	Kharghar	1780
