= Darna Dam =

- Location within Maharashtra
- Official name: Darna Dam D00972
- Location: Igatpuri
- Coordinates: 19.7619781°N 73.7371876°E
- Opening date: 1916
- Owners: Government of Maharashtra, India

Dam and spillways
- Type of dam: Gravity
- Impounds: Darna River
- Height: 28 m (92 ft)
- Length: 1,634 m (5,361 ft)
- Dam volume: 0.018861 km^{3} (0.004525 cu mi)

Reservoir
- Total capacity: 0.209820 km^{3} (0.050338 cu mi)
- Surface area: 34.750 km^{2} (13.417 sq mi)

Darna Dam, is a gravity dam on Darna river near Igatpuri, Nashik district in the state of Maharashtra in India.

== Specifications ==
The height of the dam above lowest foundation is 28 m (92 ft) while the length is 1,634 m (5,361 ft). The volume content is 0.018861 km^{3} (0.004525 cu mi) and gross storage capacity is 0.226870 km^{3} (0.054429 cu mi).

== See also ==
- Dams in Maharashtra
- List of reservoirs and dams in India
