= Trimbakeshwar Temple =

Ancient Hindu temple in Nashik, Maharashtra, India

Trimbakeshwar Shiva Temple
- Trimbakeshwar Jyotirlinga
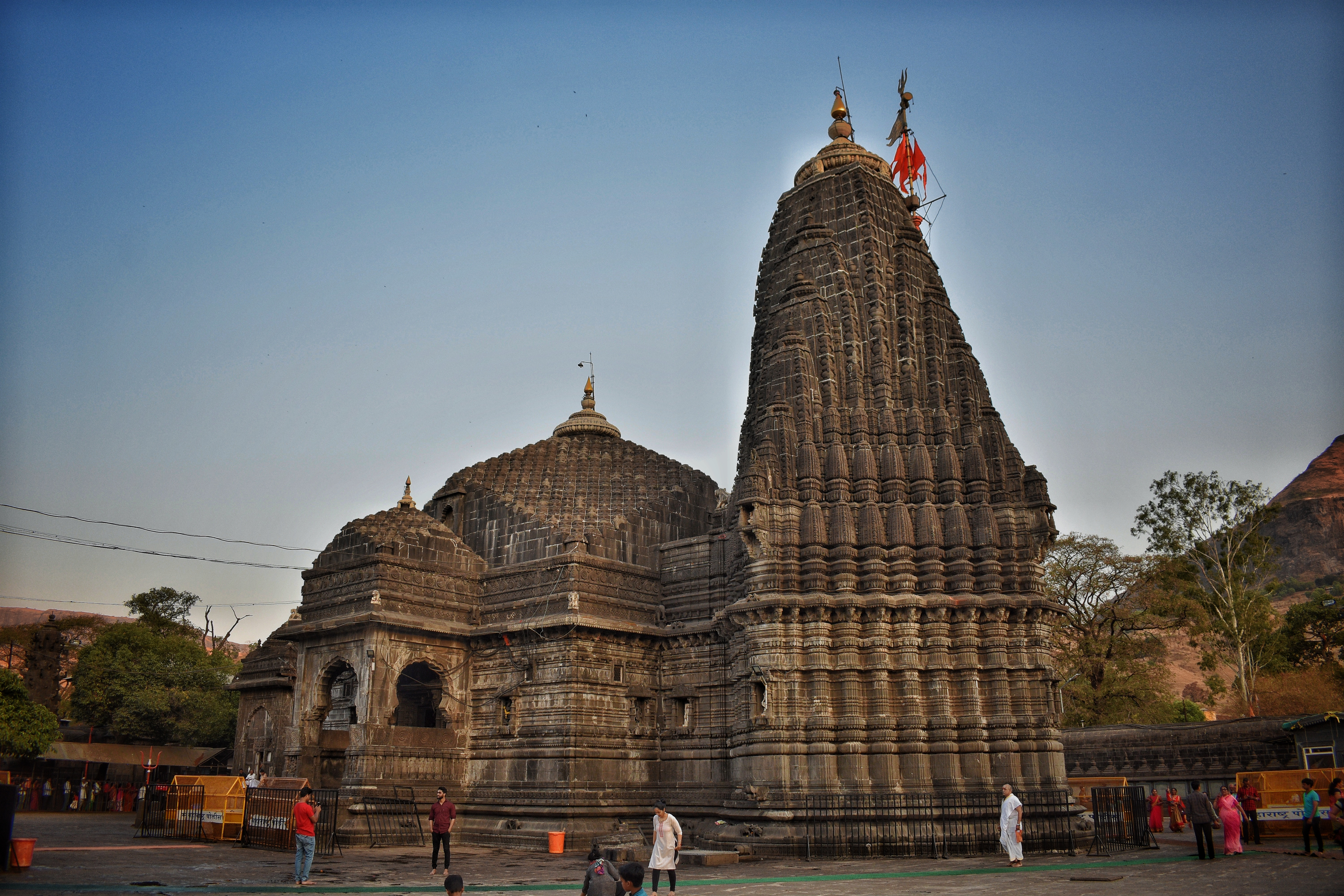
- Shri Trimbakeshwar Mandir

- Location within Maharashtra

Religion
- Affiliation: Hinduism
- District: Nashik
- Deity: Shiva
- Festival: Maha Shivaratri

Location
- Location: Trimbak
- State: Maharashtra
- Country: India
- Coordinates: 19°55′56″N 73°31′51″E

Architecture
- Type: Hemadpanthi
- Creator: Balaji Baji Rao

Website
- Trimbakeshwar Trust Website

Trimbakeshwar Shiva Temple (श्री त्र्यंबकेश्वर ज्योतिर्लिंग मंदिर) is an ancient Hindu temple in the town of Trimbak, in the Trimbakeshwar tehsil, in the Nashik District of Maharashtra, India, 28 km from the city of Nashik and 40 km from Nashik road. It is dedicated to the Hindu god Shiva and is one of the twelve jyotirlingas where the Hindu genealogy registers at Trimbakeshwar, Maharashtra are kept. The origin of the sacred Godavari River is near Trimbak. Several Hindu rituals are carried out in Trimbakeshwar, for that pilgrims travel from all over India.

The Kusavarta kunda (sacred pond) in the temple premises, built by Shrimant Sardar Raosaheb Parnerkar, who was the Fadnavis of Indore State, is the source of the Godavari River, the second longest river in India. A bust of Sardar Fadnavis and his wife can be seen on the edge of the kunda. The current temple was built by Peshwa Balaji Baji Rao after it was destroyed by Mughal ruler Aurangzeb.

== Architecture ==
The temple is located between three hills namely:

- Brahmagiri,
- Nilagiri and
- Kalagiri.

The temple has three lingas (an iconic form of Shiva) representing:

- Shiva,
- Vishnu and
- Brahma.

The temple tank is called Amritavarshini, which measured 28 m (92 ft) by 30 m (98 ft). There are three other bodies of water, namely:

- Bilvatirtha,
- Viswanantirtha and
- Mukundatirtha.

There are images of various deities, namely,

- Ganga,
- Jaleswara,
- Rameswara,
- Gautameswara,
- Kedarnatha,
- Rama,
- Krishna,
- Parashurama and
- Lakshmi Narayana.

The temple also has several monasteries and samadhis of saints.

== Jyotirlinga ==
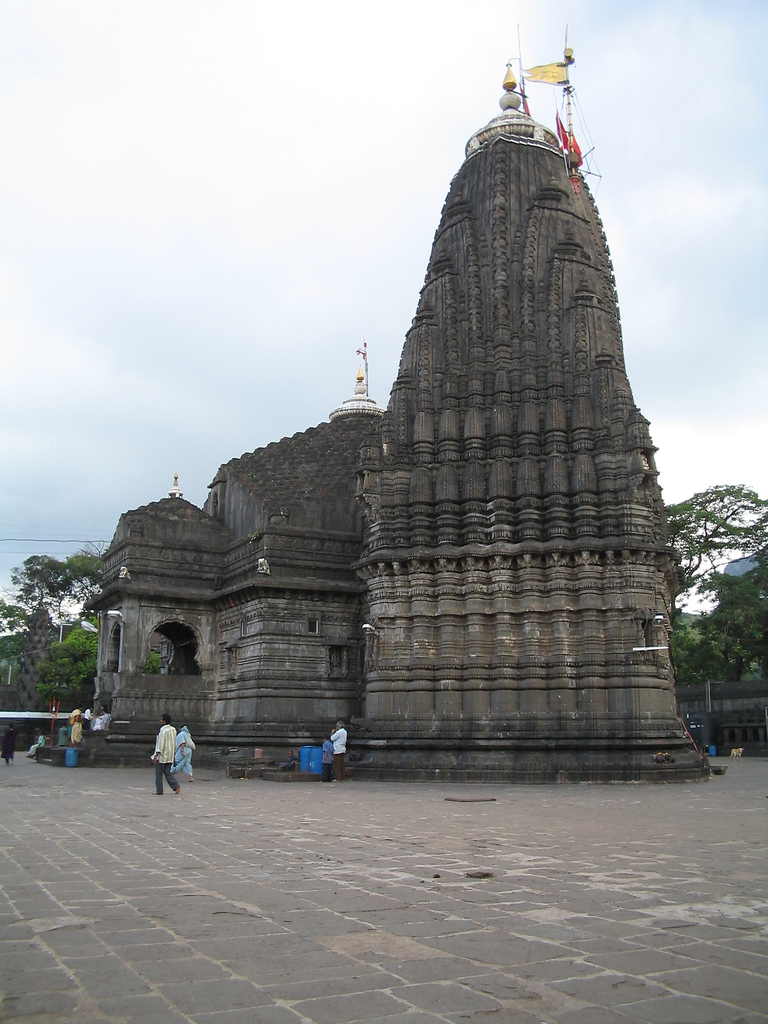
Triambakeshwar Temple, Nashik

As per the Shiva Purana, once Brahma (the Hindu God of creation) and Vishnu (the Hindu God of preservation) had an argument in terms of supremacy of creation. To test them, Shiva pierced the three worlds as a huge endless pillar of light, the jyotirlinga. Vishnu and Brahma split their ways to downwards and upwards respectively to find the end of the light in either direction. Brahma lied that he found out the end, while Vishnu conceded his defeat. Shiva, then assumed his true form and cursed Brahma that he would have no place in ceremonies while Vishnu would be worshipped till the end of eternity. The jyotirlinga is the supreme partless reality, out of which Shiva partly appears. The Jyotirlinga shrines, thus are places where Shiva appeared as a fiery column of light. Originally there were believed to be 64 jyotirlingas, while 12 of them are considered to be very auspicious and holy. Each of the twelve jyotirlinga sites take the name of the presiding deity - each considered different manifestation of Shiva. At all these sites, the primary image is lingam representing the beginningless and endless Stambha pillar, symbolizing the infinite nature of Shiva. The twelve jyotirlingas are:

- Somnath at Veraval in Gujarat,
- Mallikarjuna at Srisailam in Andhra Pradesh,
- Mahakaleswar at Ujjain in Madhya Pradesh,
- Omkareshwar in Madhya Pradesh,
- Kedarnath in Uttarakhand ,
- Bhimashankar in Maharashtra,
- Viswanath at Varanasi in Uttar Pradesh,
- Triambakeshwar in Nashik in Maharashtra,
- Vaidyanath at Deoghar in Jharkhand,
- Nageshwar Temple at Dwaraka in Gujarat,
- Rameshwar at Rameswaram in Tamil Nadu and
- Grishneshwar at Chhatrapati Sambhajinagar in Maharashtra.

Shiva showed himself as a Jyotirlinga on the night of the Aridra Nakshatra. It is believed that a person can see the Jyotirlingas as columns of fire piercing through the earth when he reaches a higher level of spiritual attainment. Each Jyotirlinga site takes the name of the presiding deity. Basically, the Jyotirlinga signifies the infinite nature of Shiva. At the highest level, Shiva is regarded as formless, limitless, transcendent and unchanging absolute Brahman and the primal Atman (soul, self) of the universe.

=== Genealogy registers ===
Hindu genealogy registers at Trimbakeshwar are the genealogy registers of pilgrims maintained here by pandits.

== Temple legend ==
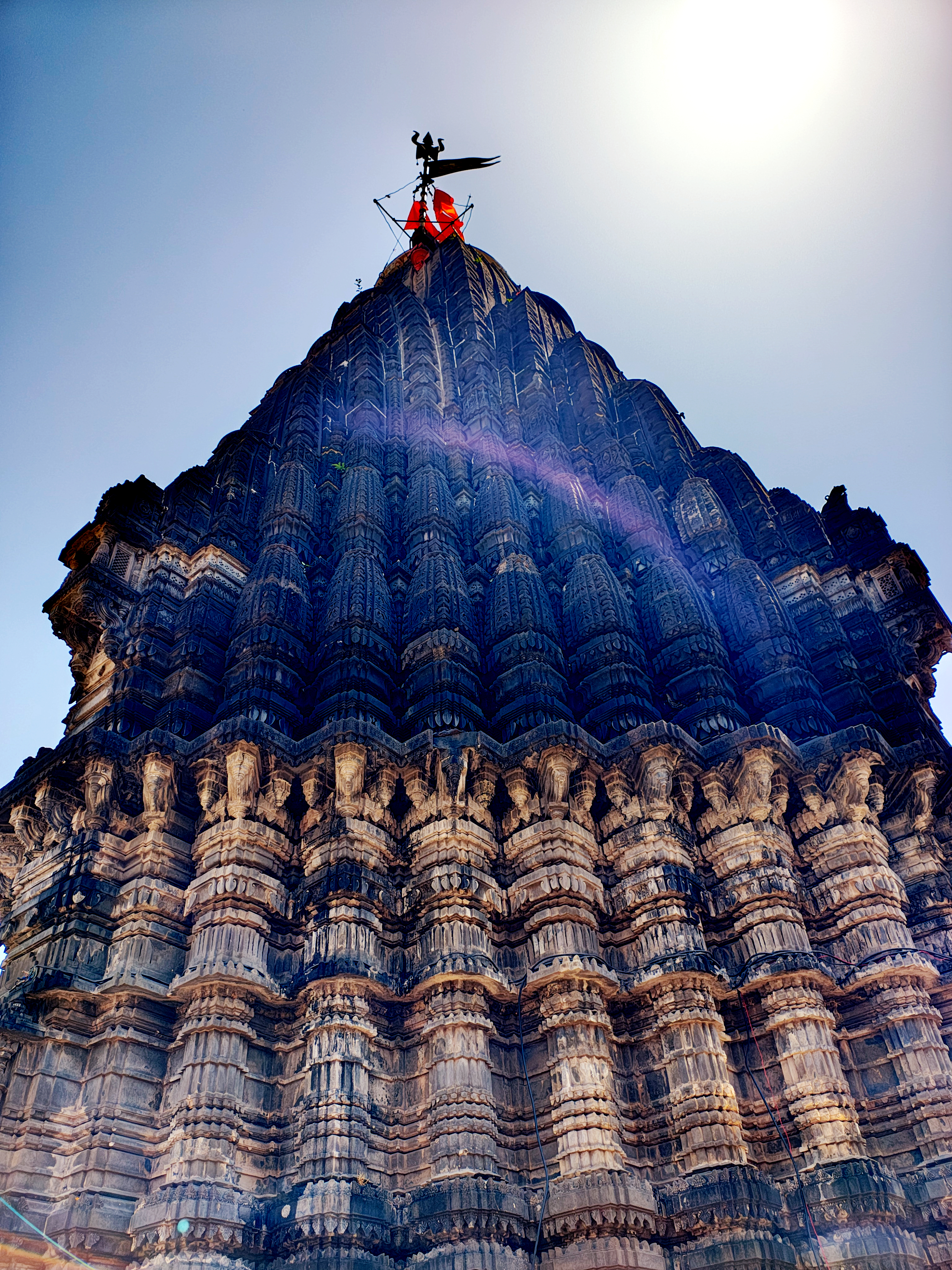
Trimbakeshwar Shiva Temple Gopuram

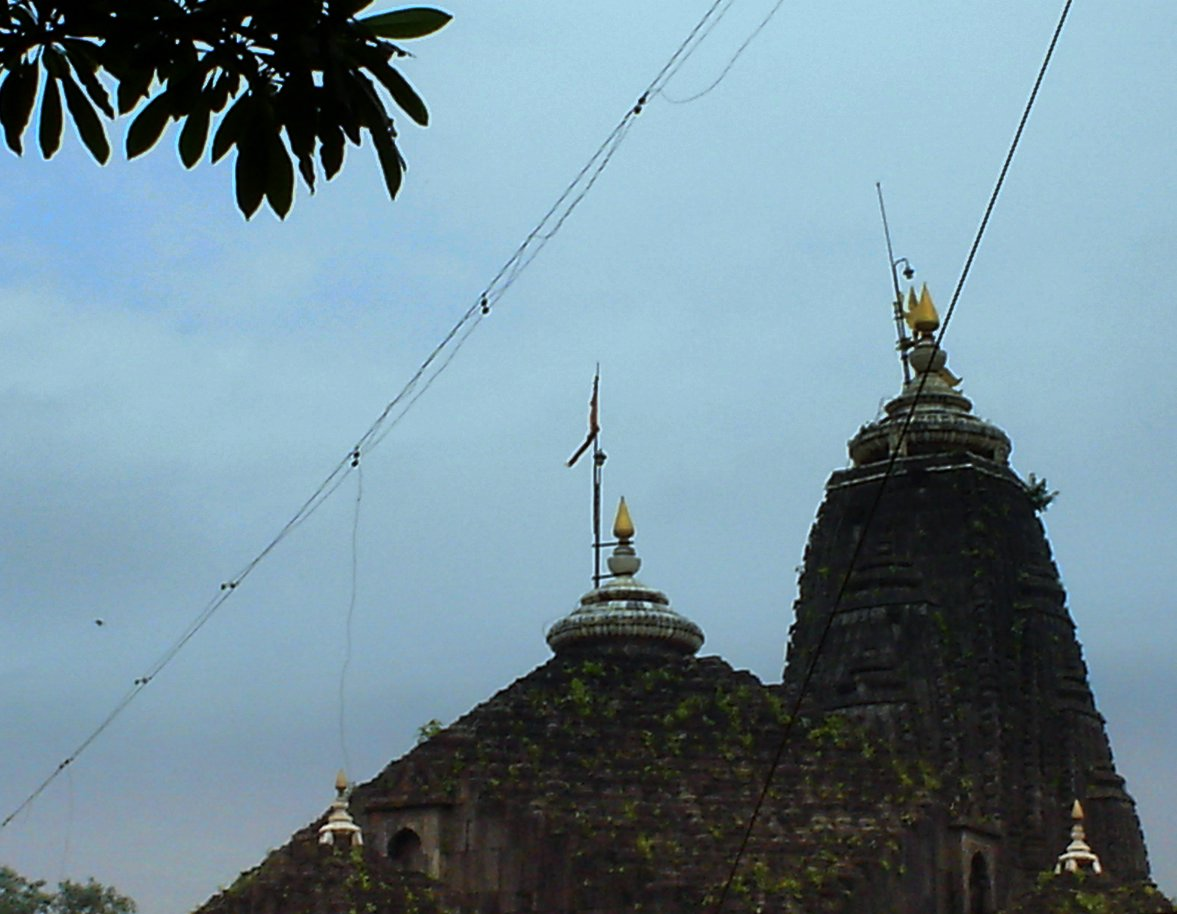
Close up of the top of Trimbakeshwar Shiva Temple

Shri Trimbakeshwar is a religious center having one of the twelve Jyotirlingas. The extraordinary feature of the Jyotirlinga located here is its three faces embodying Brahma, Vishnu, and Shiva. Due to the excessive use of water, the linga has started to erode. It is said that this erosion symbolizes the eroding nature of human society. The Lingas are covered by a jeweled crown which is placed over the Gold Mask of Trideva (Brahma Vishnu Shiva). The crown is said to be from the age of Pandavas and consists of diamonds, emeralds, and many precious stones. The original Nassak Diamond which adorned the revered linga was eventually stolen by the British and currently is placed on a sword. The crown is displayed every Monday from 4-5 pm (Shiva).

All other Jyotirlingas have Shiva as the main deity. The entire black stone temple is known for its appealing architecture and sculpture and is at the foothills of a mountain called Brahmagiri. Three sources of the Godavari originate from the Brahmagiri mountain.

== Story related to the Godavari River ==
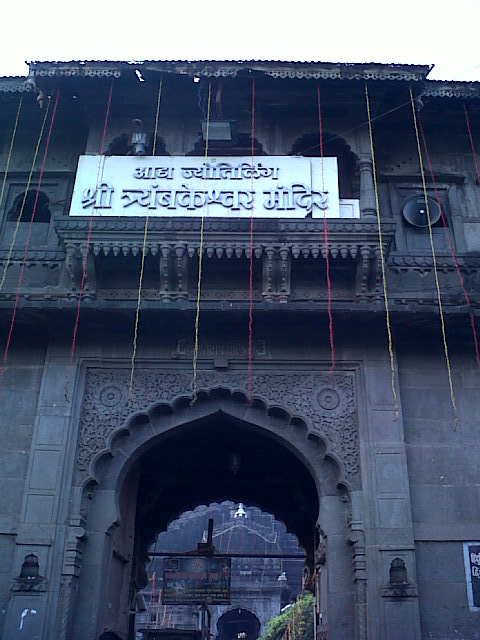
Entrance to the Trimbakeshwar Shiva Temple.

The Godavari River is often referred to as the Ganga of the South due to its significance. According to Hindu mythology, the Godavari has a divine origin, and several stories are linked to its creation.

The Birth of the Godavari – Sage Gautama’s Penance:

Sage Gautama is a central figure in the story of the Godavari's origin. It is said that Gautama Rishi once lived in a secluded ashram with his wife, Ahalya, in the region of Trimbakeshwar (near modern-day Trimbak in Maharashtra). There was a severe drought that affected the region, and the local people suffered from hunger and thirst. To alleviate their suffering, Sage Gautama prayed to the river Ganges for help. However, the Ganges was reluctant to come to the region due to the disturbance caused by her descent from the heavens. Sage Gautama performed intense penance and austerities for thousands of years at the peak of Brahmagiri Hill, located in the Trimbakeshwar area. Pleased with his devotion, Lord Shiva agreed to bless Gautama and directed the Ganges to flow in that region. However, the river could not directly flow due to the wrath of Shiva, and instead, the Ganges appeared as a stream and flowed to the earth through the Trimbak hills. This stream eventually became known as the Godavari River. The Godavari river is considered sacred, and it is believed that Sage Gautama bathed in its waters to purify himself from the sin of unintentionally killing a cow. This act of penance and purification is a key part of the origin of the river according to tradition.

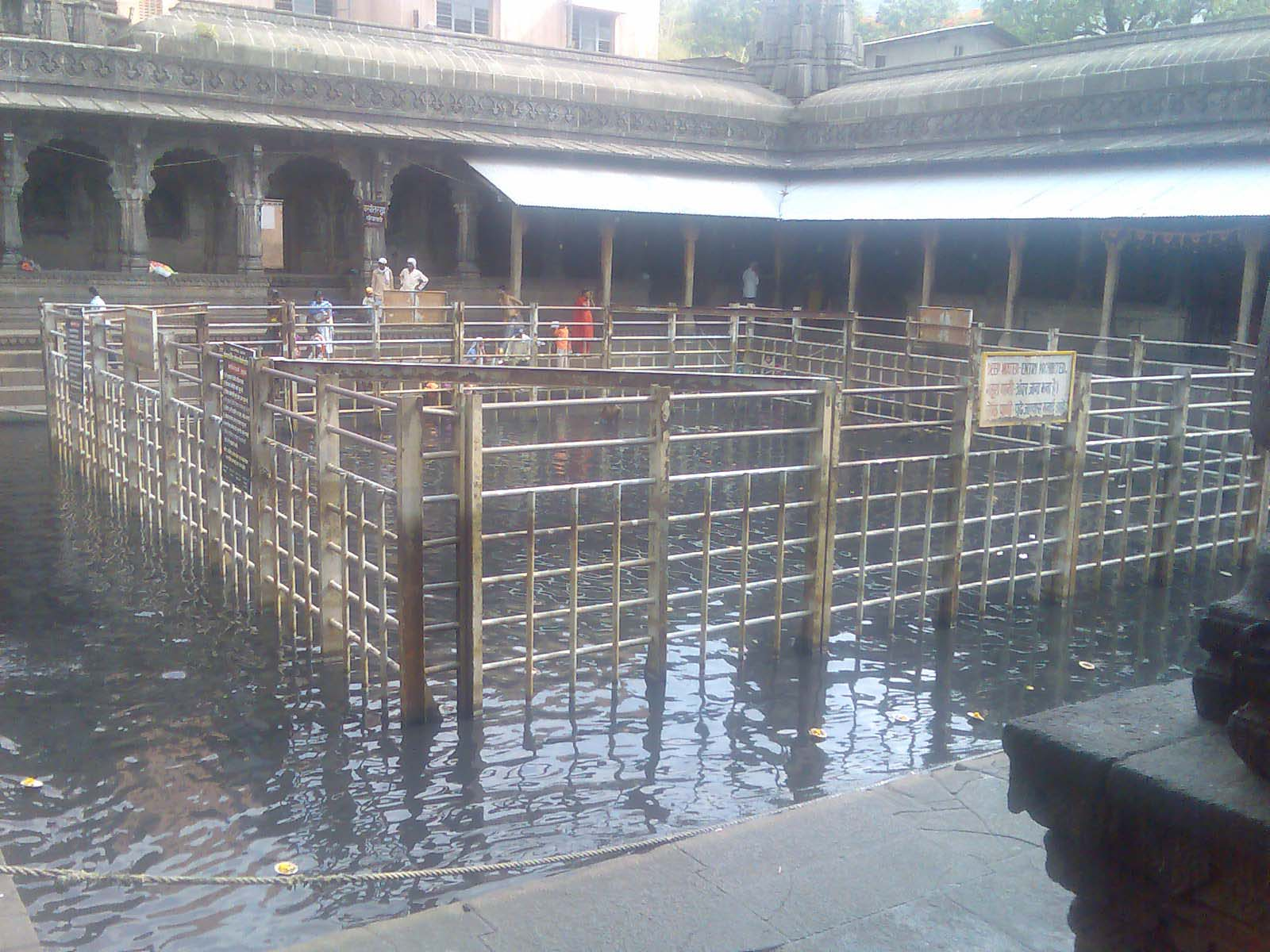
Kusavarta, a place where river Godavari takes course.

Connection to Lord Vishnu and Lord Shiva:

Another legend states that the river Godavari was created by Lord Vishnu in the form of Trivikram (the Vamana avatar), who pressed the earth with his foot to release water, which eventually formed the Godavari River. Some accounts suggest that the river emerged from the feet of Lord Vishnu. Another part of the story involves Lord Shiva, who, when pleased with Sage Gautama’s penance, allowed the Ganges to flow from the heavens and take the form of the Godavari, thus further associating the river with divine blessings.

This place is known for its many religious rituals (vidhis). Narayan Nagbali, Kalsarpa Shanti, Tripindi Vidhi are done here. Narayan Nagbali puja is performed at Trimbakeshwar only. This puja is performed in three days. This puja is performed on special dates. Some days are not suitable to perform this puja. This puja is performed for many reasons like: to cure an illness, going through bad times, killing a Cobra (Nag), childless couples, financial crisis or if you want to perform some religious puja to have everything.

Trimbakeshwar town has a large number of Brahmin households and is also a centre for Vedic Gurukuls (a kind of boarding school). It also has ashrams and Muths devoted to Ashtanga Yoga, the Hindu art of living.

The existing temple was built out of basalt after it was commissioned by Peshwa Nanasaheb. It so happens that the Peshwa made a bet on whether the stone surrounding the Jyotirlinga, is hollow from the inside or not. The stone was proved to be hollow, and on losing the bet, the Peshwa built a marvelous temple out of it.

The Shiva deity of the temple consisted of the famous Nassak Diamond. It was looted by the British in the Third Anglo-Maratha War and lies with one owner or the other ever since. The diamond presently lies with Edward J. Hand, a trucking firm executive from Greenwich, Connecticut, USA.

The place is known for its scenery in the rainy/monsoon season.

== Shri Nilambika/Dattatreya/ Matamba Temple ==
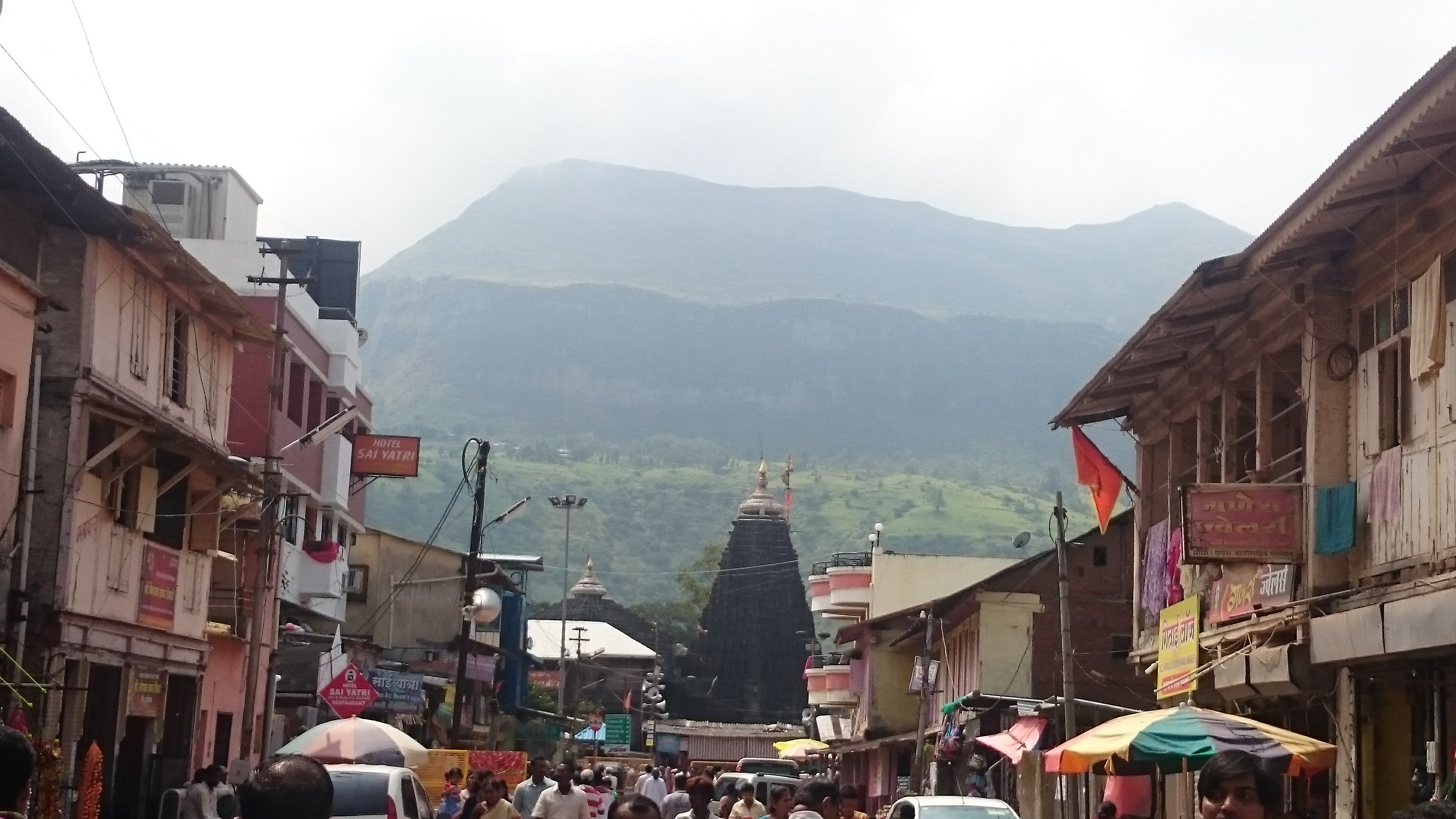
Back view of Trimbakeshwar Shiva Temple

This temple is on top of the Neel mountain. All goddesses ('Matamba', 'Renuka', 'Mananmba') came here to see Parashuram when he was performing penance (tapas). After his penance, he requested all goddesses to stay there and the temple was formed for these goddesses.

Akhil Bhartiya Shree Swami Samarth Gurupeeth, Trimbakeshwar Temple of Shri Swami Samarth Maharaj is 1 km from Shiva Temple. This temple is a marvelous example of Vastu Shastra.

== Connectivity ==
Shri Trimbakeshwar Shiva Temple is 30 kilometers on road from Nashik, and 157 kilometers from Thane. The best way to reach the temple is by road. The closest railway station is the Nashik Road Railway Station that is 39 kilometers by road.

== Other Jyotirlinga In Maharashtra ==
- Jyotirlinga
- Grishneshwar Temple
- Bhimashankar Temple
- Shri Vaijnath Temple
- Aundha Nagnath Temple

== Notes ==
- Chaturvedi, B. K. (2006), Shiva Purana (First ed.), New Delhi: Diamond Pocket Books (P) Ltd, ISBN 81-7182-721-7
- Eck, Diana L. (1999), Banaras, city of light (First ed.), New York: Columbia University Press, ISBN 0-231-11447-8
- Gwynne, Paul (2009), World Religions in Practice: A Comparative Introduction, Oxford: Blackwell Publication, ISBN 978-1-4051-6702-4.
- Harding, Elizabeth U. (1998). "God, the Father". Kali: The Black Goddess of Dakshineswar. Motilal Banarsidass. pp. 156–157. ISBN 978-81-208-1450-9.
- Lochtefeld, James G. (2002), The Illustrated Encyclopedia of Hinduism: A-M, Rosen Publishing Group, p. 122, ISBN 0-8239-3179-X
- R., Venugopalam (2003), Meditation: Any Time Any Where (First ed.), Delhi: B. Jain Publishers (P) Ltd., ISBN 81-8056-373-1
- Vivekananda, Swami. "The Paris Congress of the History of Religions". The Complete Works of Swami Vivekananda. Vol. 4.
