= Darna River =

Darna river

Location
- Country: India
- State: Maharashtra
- District: Nashik
- City: Nashik

Physical characteristics
- Source: Kulang hill
  - location: Sahyadris, Nashik, North Maharashtra, Maharashtra, India
  - coordinates: 19°58′27″N 73°56′12″E
- Mouth: Godavari River
  - location: Darnasangvi, Nashik, Khandesh, Maharashtra
  - coordinates: 19°10′46″N 73°02′24″E
  - elevation: 550 m (1,800 ft)
- Length: 80 km (50 mi)

Basin features
- Tributaries
  - left: Vaki River, Aaundha River, Waldevi River
  - right: Kadva river

Darna is a minor right-bank tributary of the Godavari in the Nashik District, Maharashtra, India. Rising north of the Kalsubai range, it drains Igatpuri, Nashik and Niphad Talukas of Nashik District. The conjunction with Godavari is situated at Darnasangvi.

== Origin ==
The Darna rises on the northern slopes of the Kulang hill fort in the Sahyadris about 13 km. south-east of Igatpuri.

== Course ==
Though the straight line distance from the source to its confluence with the Darna is only about 50 km., it has a very long and winding course which measures about 80 km. Its banks are like those of the Godavari below Nashik, of no great height, but broken by scores of small streams, making the passage along the banks of the river very difficult for laden carts. It is crossed by a bridge at Chehedi on the Nasik-Pune road, on the way to Sinnar. The bed is for the most part wide and sandy, though at times, the water flows over rocks. The Darna Dam is constructed across the Darna near Nandgaon village giving rise to the storage known as Lake Beale, which is visible for considerable distance while travelling by train from Mumbai to Nasik on the right hand side. This has enabled the construction of a pick-up weir on the Godavari river at Nandur-Madhmeshwar to divert the water into the Godavari canals.

On the right bank, at Belu, the river Darna receives the Kadva, not the large river of that name, but a small stream flowing north-eastwards between Mhordan-Katlia hills on the west and Kalsubai-Bitangad-Patta range on the east in the south-eastern part of Igatpuri taluka. On the left bank the Darna has only three tributaries of any size, and they hold little water during the hot season. They are the Waki, the Unduhol and the Valdevi.

== Tributaries ==
- Vaki: the Vaki nadi rises in the Dhoria hill and flows in a general southerly direction. The Tringalwadi Dam is located on the river. It passes between Igatpuri and Ghoti joins the Darna.
- Aaundha: the river is also spelt as Unduhol or Aund Vahal. It rises to the south of Anjaneri hill and flows in a south-easterly course. Here the river is impounded by the Mukane Dam. The reservoir waters turn in a northerly direction to the north of Kavnai hill, expelling the Aundha river to resume its easterly course before it joins the Darna just below the Darna dam.
- Waldevi: the Valdevi river comes to exist on the eastern slopes of the Anjaneri hill. It flows in a general easterly direction passing by Dadhegaon, runs through the outskirts of Nashik city and joins the Darna near Chehdi. It the longest tributary of Darna and joins it on the left-bank.

== Dams ==
- Darna Dam
- Bhavali Dam

== See also ==
- List of rivers of India
- Rivers of India
