= Kedarnatha =

Scientific classification
- Kingdom: Plantae
- Clade: Tracheophytes
- Clade: Angiosperms
- Clade: Eudicots
- Clade: Asterids
- Order: Apiales
- Family: Apiaceae
- Subfamily: Apioideae
- Tribe: Selineae
- Genus: Kedarnatha; P.K.Mukh. & Constance

Synonyms
- Indoschulzia Pimenov & Kljuykov

Genus of plants

Kedarnatha is a genus of flowering plants belonging to the family Apiaceae.

Its native range is Himalaya to Northern Myanmar.

Species:

- Kedarnatha garhwalica (H.Wolff) Pimenov & Kljuykov
- Kedarnatha hameliana (Farille & S.B.Malla) Pimenov & Kljuykov
- Kedarnatha meifolia Pimenov & Kljuykov
- Kedarnatha oreomyrrhiformis (Farille & S.B.Malla) Pimenov & Kljuykov
- Kedarnatha sanctuarii P.K.Mukh. & Constance
- Kedarnatha vaginata Pimenov & Kljuykov
