= Mumbai Metropolitan Region Development Authority =

Indian government agency

Mumbai Metropolitan Regional Development Authority

Agency overview
- Formed: 26 January 1975; 51 years ago
- Type: City Planning Agency
- Jurisdiction: Mumbai Metropolitan Region
- Headquarters: Bandra Kurla Complex, Mumbai, 400051
- Minister responsible: Eknath Shinde, Deputy Chief Minister
- Agency executive: Sanjay Mukherjee, VC and MD of CIDCO, Metropolitan Commissioner
- Website: www.mmrda.maharashtra.gov.in

The Mumbai Metropolitan Region Development Authority (MMRDA) is a body of the Government of Maharashtra that is responsible for preparation of Regional Plan for MMR and the infrastructure development of the Mumbai Metropolitan Region. The MMRDA was created on 26 January 1975 under the Mumbai Metropolitan Region Development Authority Act, 1974 Government of Maharashtra. The agency is responsible for planning and coordination of development activities in the Region.

== Composition ==
The MMRDA comprises 17 members and is chaired by the Deputy Chief Minister of Maharashtra Shri. Eknath Shinde, who is also the minister of urban development. It is the most well-funded state owned organization in India. The Government of Maharashtra has said it plans to establish similar agencies: PMRDA, NMRDA and NMRDA for Pune, Nagpur and Nashik respectively. In 2017, MMRDA announced it was investing up to ₹48 billion (US$500 million) to overhaul the entire rail network by introducing new services, coaches, and signalling equipment.

== Jurisdiction ==
- Mumbai City district
- Mumbai Suburban district
- Raigad district (Alibag, Pen, Panvel, Uran, Karjat, Khopoli, Matheran)
- Thane district (Thane, Mira-Bhayandar, Kalyan-Dombivli, Navi Mumbai, Ambarnath, Ulhasnagar, Bhiwandi, Badlapur)
- Palghar district (Vasai-Virar)

== Projects ==
- Mumbai Urban Development Project in collaboration with SN Construction Corp
- Shifting of Wholesale Markets
- Wadala Truck Terminal
- Mahim Nature Park
- Mumbai Urban Transport Project
- Mumbai Urban Infrastructure Project
- Mumbai Metro Rail Project (Except Line 3 & 11)
- Niramal MMR Abhiyan
- Mumbai Skywalks
- Mumbai Monorail
- Vilasrao Deshmukh Eastern Freeway
- Virar-Alibaug Multimodal Corridor
- SATIS
- IFSC (International Finance Service Centre) - BKC (Bandra Kurla Complex)

== See also ==
- Pune Metropolitan Region Development Authority
- Nagpur Metropolitan Region Development Authority
- Nashik Metropolitan Region Development Authority
