= Nashik Metropolitan Region =

- Metropolitan region
- Country: India
- State: Maharashtra
- District: Nashik
- Time zone: UTC+5.30 (IST)
- Development Authority: Nashik Metropolitan Region Development Authority
- Chairman: Eknath Shinde, Deputy CM; Minister of Urban Affairs
- Minister Responsible: Dadaji Bhuse, MLA; Guardian Minister of Nashik
- Metropolitan Commissioner: Radhakrishna Game, IAS

Nashik Metropolitan Region (NMR) is the metropolitan region around the city of Nashik. The Nashik Metropolitan Region Development Authority (NMRDA) is the planning and development authority of the region formed. NMRDA is headed by the Deputy Chief minister of Maharashtra (presently by Eknath Shinde). Radhakrushna Game, IAS, is the chief executive officer. The authority is responsible for various town planning schemes.

== Municipal Corporation ==
- Nashik Municipal Corporation

== Cantonment Board ==
- Deolali Cantonment Board

== Growth Centers ==
- Growth Center of Ghoti (bk), Khambale & Dahalewadi
- Gonde -Vadivarhe Growth Center
- Pimpalgaon Basvant Urban Growth Center
- Sinnar Urban Growth Center
- Ozar Urban Growth Center
- Dindori Growth Center

== Villages Under NMRDA in Nashik Taluka ==
- Ambe Bahula
- Govardhan
- Mungsare
- Shinde
- Babhaleshwar
- Govindpur
- Nagalwadi
- Shivangaon
- Belatgavhan
- Hinganvedhe
- Naikwadi
- Subhash Nagar
- Belgaon Dhaga
- Indira Nagar
- Nanegaon
- Sultanpur
- Bhagur (Gramn)
- Jakhori
- Odha
- Talegaon-Anjneri
- Chandgiri
- Jalalpur
- Ojharkhed
- Tiradshet
- Chandashi
- Jategaon
- Palse
- Vadgaon
- Dahegaon
- Kalvi
- Pipalgaon Garudeshwar
- Vaishnav Nagar
- Dari
- Kasyap Nagar
- Pimpalad Nashik
- Vanjar Wadi
- Devargaon
- Kotamgaon
- Pimpri Sayyad
- Villholi
- Donvade
- Ladchi
- Rahuri
- Vinchur Gavali
- Dudgaon
- Lahvit
- Raykad Nagar
- Vasali
- Dugaon
- Lakhalgaon
- Rajewadi
- Yashwant Nagar
- Ganeshgaon Naik
- Lohshingave
- Rahurbahula
- Sandgaon
- Ganeshgaon Trambak
- Madsangavi
- Sansari
- Dondegaon
- Gangamhalungi
- Mahadevpur
- Sarul
- Nandur Bahula
- Ganga Padhli
- Mahiravani
- Savargaon
- Aswali Bahula
- Gangavare
- Manoli
- Shastri Nagar
- Shingave Bahula
- Gaulane
- Matori
- Shevgedarna
- Samangaon
- Girnare
- Mohgaon
- Shilapur
- Eklahre
- Ambad Bu.

== Villages under NMRDA in Niphad Taluka ==
- Savali
- Godegaon
- Maouje Sukene
- Kokangaon
- Darna Sangavi
- Pimpalas
- Oune
- Shirasgaon
- Lalpadi
- Palkhed
- Narayangaon
- Behad
- Shimpi Takli
- Davachvadi
- Amrut Nagar
- Ambarkhed
- Chatori
- Raulas
- Ojhar
- Pimpalgaon (Baswant)
- Varhedarna
- Pimpri
- Vijaynagar
- Talvade
- Chehdi Khu.
- Ahergaon
- Banganga Nagar
- Pimpalgaon (Ni.)
- Nagapur
- Lonvadi
- Datyane
- Mahajanpur
- Chitegaon
- Karsul
- Thergaon
- Bhendali
- Chandori
- Narayan Tembhe
- Jivhale
- Ramnagar
- Saykheda
- Vadala Najik
- Dikshi
- Songaon
- Shingave
- Kasabe Sukene
- Sakore

== Villages under NMRDA in Sinnar Taluka ==
- Pandhurli
- Paaste
- Jongaltembhi
- Kundavadi
- Sawatamali Nagar
- Chincholi
- Naygaon
- Saradvadi
- Ghorvad
- Mohdari
- Jaygaon
- Maparvadi
- Khaprale
- Malgaon
- Belu
- Varagaon Pimpri
- Chandrapur
- Moh
- Agaskhind
- Patpimpri
- Vinchur Dalvi
- Brahmanvadi
- Harsule
- Deshvandi
- Jambgaon
- Vadjhire
- Shashtri Nagar
- Sinnar Gramin
- Vadgaon Pingla
- Songiri
- Bhatvadi
- Chandrapur
- Mirpur

== Villages under NMRDA in Dindori Taluka ==
- Dindori
- Madkijamb
- Indore
- Ramshej
- Manori
- Pimpalnare
- Talegaon Dindori
- Vanarvadi
- Khatvad
- Dhakambe
- Varvandi
- Shivnai
- Ambedindori
- Ganeshgaon
- Akrale
- Korhate
- Khadaksukene
- Chinchkhed
- Kurnoli
- Janori
- Jaulake Dindori
- Gavalvadi
- Mohadi
- Vilvandi
- Kochargaon
- Bhoryacha Pada
- Tiloli
- Ravalgaon
- Deherevadi
- Ghagur
- June Dhagur
- Rasegaon

== Villages under NMRDA in Igatpuri Taluka ==
- Ghoti Budruk
- Avchitvadi
- Devle
- Daudat
- Khambale
- Vaki
- Manik khamb
- Mundhegaon
- Kavnai
- Mukne
- Padli Deshmukh
- Shenvad Khurd
- Garudeshwar
- Laxminagar
- Janori
- Krushn Nagar
- Nandurvaidya
- Kurhegaon
- Belgavhan Kurhe
- Gonde Dumala
- Vadivarhe
- Lahamgevadi
- Shenit
- Sakur
- Nandgaon Bu.
- Ghoti Khu.
- Pimpalgaon Dukra
- Kavad dara
- Dhamangaon
- Gambhirvadi
- Belgaon Varhale
- Malunje
- Samnere
- Mogre
- Somaj
- Umbarkon
- Ubhade
- Vaghere
- Dhamni
- Pimpalgaon Mor
- Khairgaon
- Kushegaon
- Shirsale
- Modale
- Gadgadsangavi
- Murambi
- Sanjegaon

== Villages under NMRDA in Trambakeshwar Taluka ==
- Kharoli
- Samundi
- Jharvad Khu.
- Dhadoshi
- Kajoli
- Bhilmal
- Pahine
- Mulegaon
- Vadholi
- Metghera Killa
- Talegaon (Trambak)
- Kochurli
- Ambai
- Sapgaon
- Shirasgaon
- Pimpalad (Trambak)
- Pengalvadi
- Talwade (Trambak)
- Anjneri
- Khambale
- Sakore
- Benjhe
- Brahmanvade (Trambak)
- Ghumodi
- Amboli
- Ganeshgaon Vaghera
- Divyacha Pada
- Pimpri Trambak
- Hirdi
- Rohile
- Malegaon
- Vinayak Nagar
- Gorthan
- Saapte
- Trimabak (Gramin)

== See also ==
- Nashik Metropolitan Region Development Authority
