= Trimbakeshwar tehsil =

Division of Nashik, Maharashtra, India

- town
- Location in Maharashtra, India
- Coordinates: 20°15′30.41″N 73°30′10.99″E
- Country: India
- State: Maharashtra
- District: Nashik

Area
  - Total: 900.27 km^{2} (347.60 sq mi)

Population
  - Total: 168,423
  - Density: 187.08/km^{2} (484.54/sq mi)

Languages
  - Official: Marathi
- Time zone: UTC+5:30 (IST)

Trimbakeshwar is a tehsil of Nashik subdivision of Nashik district in Maharashtra, India.

== Demographics ==
Religions in Trimbakeshwar taluk (2011)
| Religion | Percent |
| Hinduism | 97.89% |
| Islam | 1.06% |
| Buddhism | 0.48% |
| Other or not stated | 0.57% |

Trimbakeshwar taluka has a population of 168,423 according to the 2011 census. Trimbakeshwar had a literacy rate of 68.91% and a sex ratio of 975 females per 1000 males. 26,691 (15.85%) are under 7 years of age. 12,056 (7.16%) lived in urban areas. Scheduled Castes and Scheduled Tribes make up 4.56% and 80.20% of the population respectively.

Languages of Trimbakeshwar taluk (2011)
1. Marathi (98.6%)
2. Hindi (1.02%)
3. Others (0.42%)

At the time of the 2011 Census of India, 98.56% of the population in the district spoke Marathi and 1.02% Hindi as their first language.
