= Igatpuri =

- Town
- Igatpoora
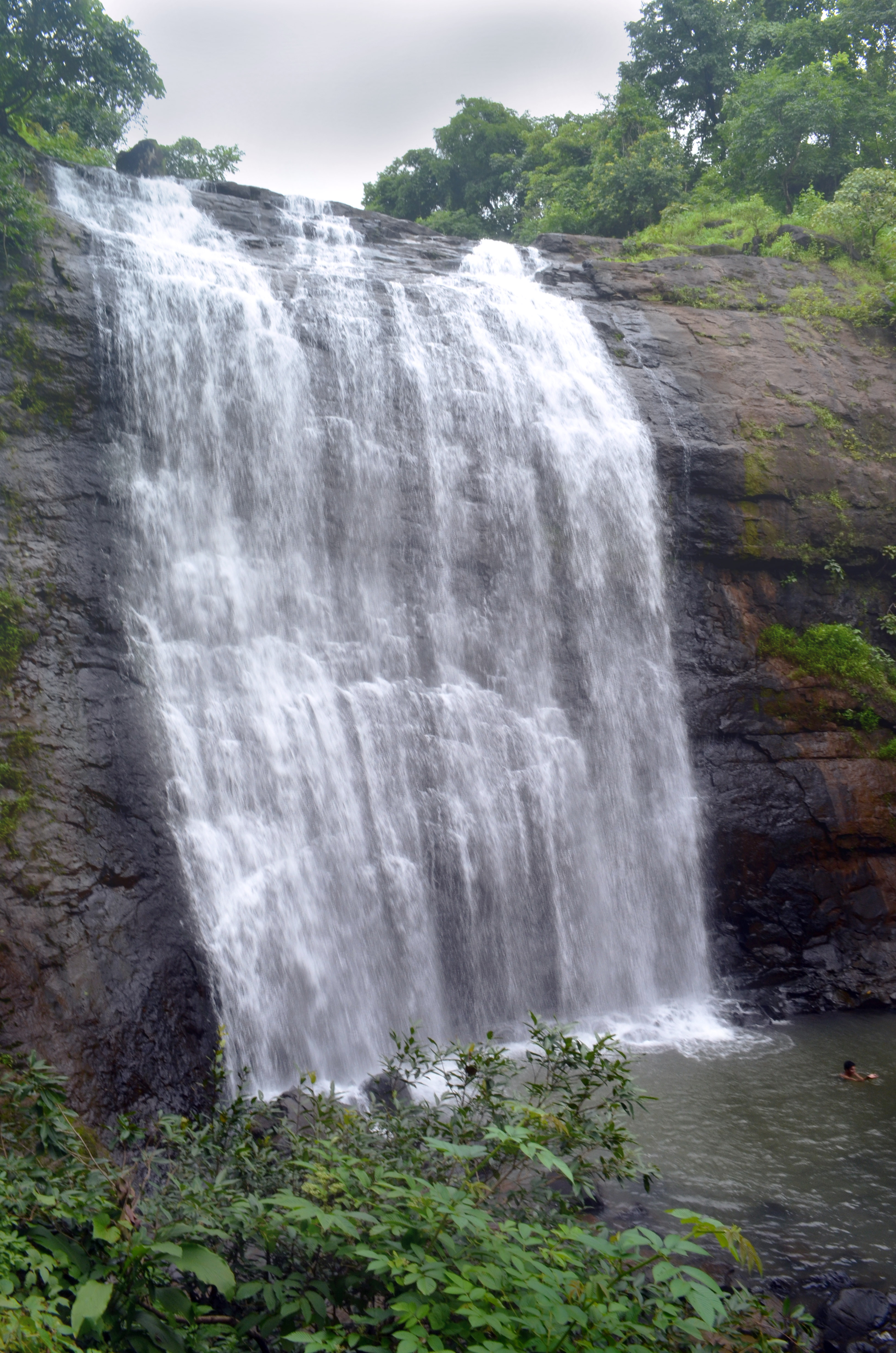
- Waterfall in Igatpuri
- Nicknames: Vipassana city, Hill station in Sahyadri
- Location in Maharashtra, India
- Coordinates: 19.7°N 73.55°E
- Country: India
- State: Maharashtra
- District: Nashik

Government
  - Type: Municipal Council
  - Body: Igatpuri Municipal Council

Area
  - Total: 15 km^{2} (5.8 sq mi)
- Elevation: 600 m (2,000 ft)

Population (2001)
  - Total: 31,572
  - Density: 2,100/km^{2} (5,500/sq mi)

Languages
  - Official: Marathi
- Time zone: UTC+5:30 (IST)
- PIN: 422403
- Vehicle registration: MH-15

Igatpuri ([iɡət̪puɾiː]; formerly known as Egutpoora) is a town and a Hill Station.

== Demographics ==
As of 2001 India census, Igatpuri had a population of 31,572. Males constitute 52% of the population and females 48%. Igatpuri has an average literacy rate of 74%, higher than the national average of 59.5%: male literacy is 80%, and female literacy is 67%. In Igatpuri, 14% of the population is under 6 years of age. People of Agri community can be found in the city, they are also called Patharvat.

Religions in Igatpuri
Religion	Percent
Hindus	77%
Muslims	14%
Buddhists	8.6%
Christians	1.4%
Jains	2.7%
Others†	0.3%
Distribution of religions †Includes Sikhs (0.2%), Buddhists (<0.2%).
