= List of Hindu temples in Pune =

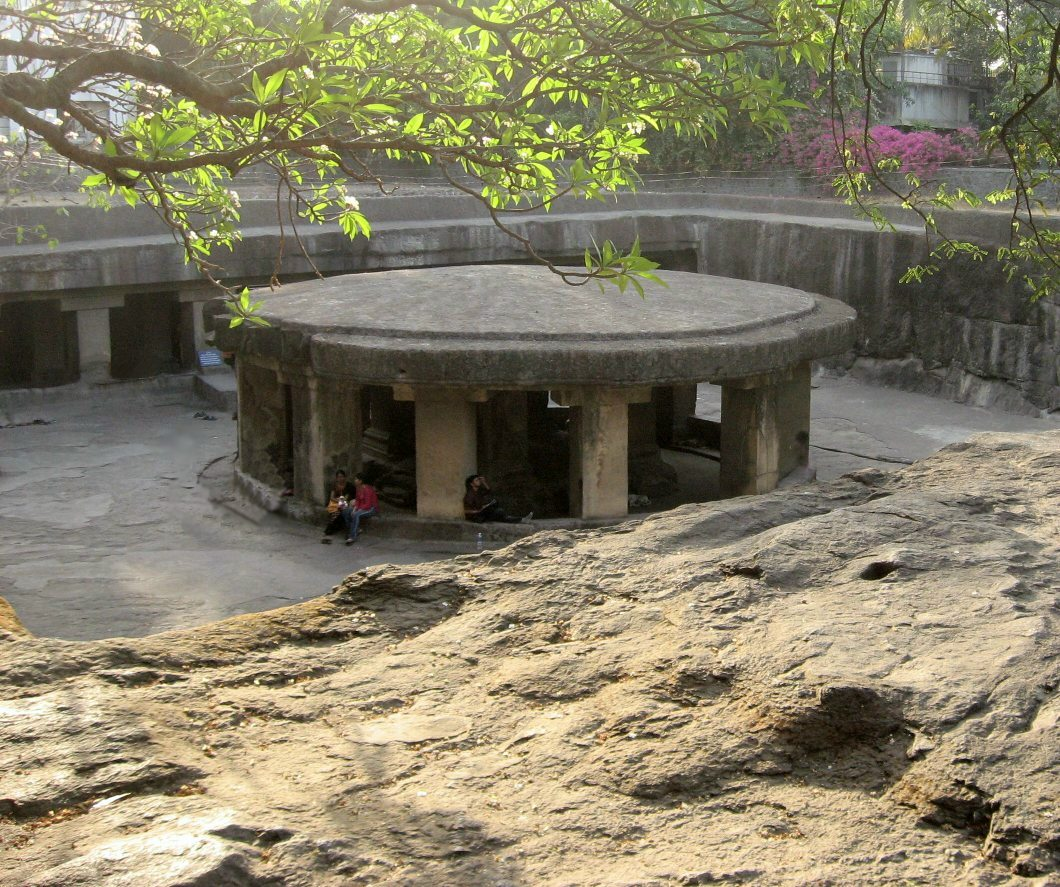
The circular Nandi Mandapa at the Pataleshwar Caves temple, built during the Rashtrakuta dynasty, is one of Pune's oldest manmade structures.

The city of Pune and the surrounding district have been at the centre of the history of Maharashtra for more than eight hundred years. A number of places revered by Marathi Hindu people are there, including five of the eight Ashtavinayak Ganesh temples. The samadhi (resting) places of the two most revered Marathi Bhakti saints, Dnyaneshwar and Tukaram, are at Alandi and Dehu respectively. The main temple of Khandoba, the family deity for most Marathi Hindus, is also in the district at Jejuri. The city's oldest temple is the Pataleshwar Caves rock-cut temple complex, built in the 8th century.

== Notable historic temples ==
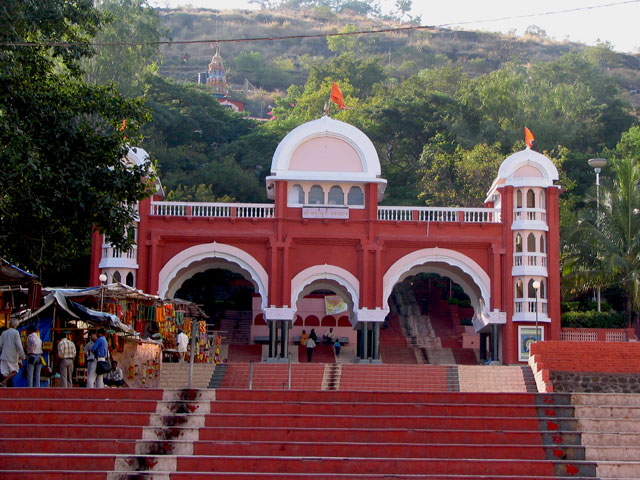
Gates of Chaturshringi temple

The patronage of the 18th century Peshwas resulted in construction of around 250 temples in the city, including those on Parvati Hill. Many of the Maruti, Vithoba, Vishnu, Mahadeo, Rama, Krishna and Ganesh temples were built in this era. The city also conducted many public festivals. The Peshwa era rulers provided endowments to more Maruti temples than to temples of other deities such as Shiva, Ganesh or Vitthal. Even in the present time, there are more Maruti temples than those of other deities.

- Pataleshwar Caves -8th century rock-cut Shiva temple.
- Chaturshringi - Temple of Goddess Chaturshringi on a hill.
- Kasba Ganapati - One of the Oldest temples in the city. It was commissioned by Jijabai during her stay in Pune in 1630s. The Ganesh temple is considered one of the presiding deity (gramdevata) of the city. There is a social custom among Marathi Hindus in Pune that any auspicious ceremony such as a wedding should commence with the families obtaining the blessing of this Ganapati.
- Tambdi Jogeshwari temple - This is very old temple in the heart of the city, dedicated to the Goddess Jogeshwari, one of the guardian deities of the city.
- Parvati - The temple complex on a hill is part of the Peshwa palace dating back to mid 1700s. There are several temples with a main Shiva temple.
- Dulya Maruti - One of the historic Maruti temples. This is also considered one of the Guardian deities of the city.
- Belbag - Built by Nana Fadnavis in late 1700s. Has a Vishnu temple.
- Tulshi baug- Peshwa era complex with a mix of temples and market for household goods.
- Omkareshwar(Marathi: ओंकारेश्वर) -A Peshwa era river-side temple, dedicated to Mahadeo.
- Khunya Murlidhar(Marathi: खुन्या मुरलीधर)- Old temple built by Sadahiv Raghunath alias Dada Gadre in 1797. The idols in the temple are of Lord Krishna and Radha. There was bloody fight between Bajiro Peshwa-II army and Dada Gadre for acquiring the idol in which 60 men were killed hence the name of the deity.
- Narpatgiri Datta Mandir:- The only seated Datta idol in entire Maharashtra.
- Satyanarayan Temple, Raviwar Peth:- A rare Satyanarayan temple.
- Gundacha Ganpati:- A temple with beautiful ganpati idol
- Laxmi Narsimha Temple, Sadashiv Peth:- A beautiful temple containing beautiful idol and bricks of broken temple of multan of lord Narsimha in Pakistan.

== Notable temples in the metro area and the district ==
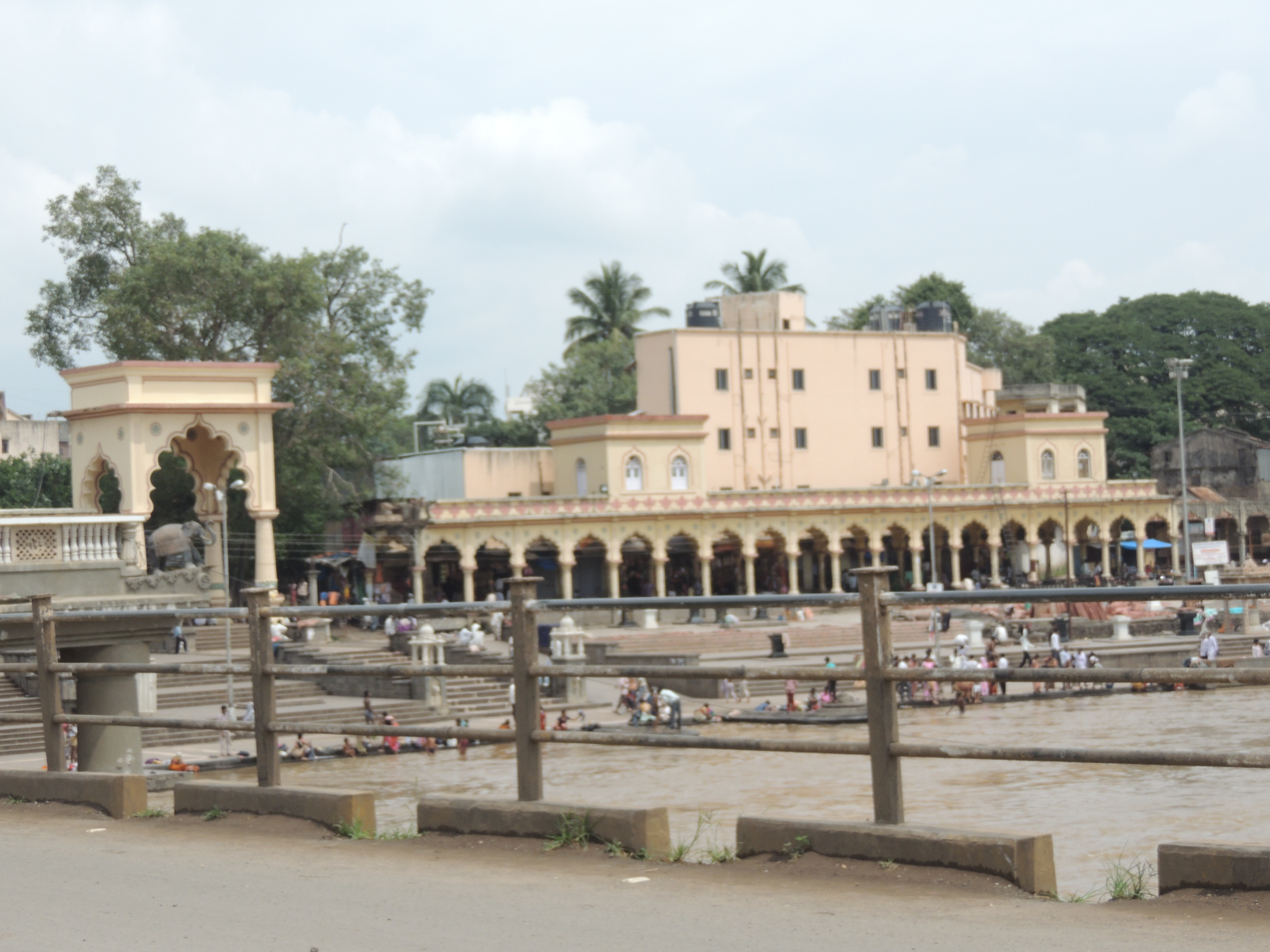
A view Alandi on the Banks of Indrayani river

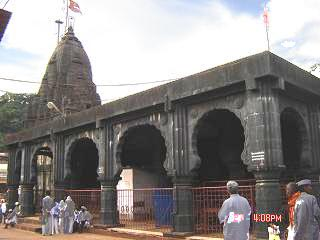
Bhimashankar temple

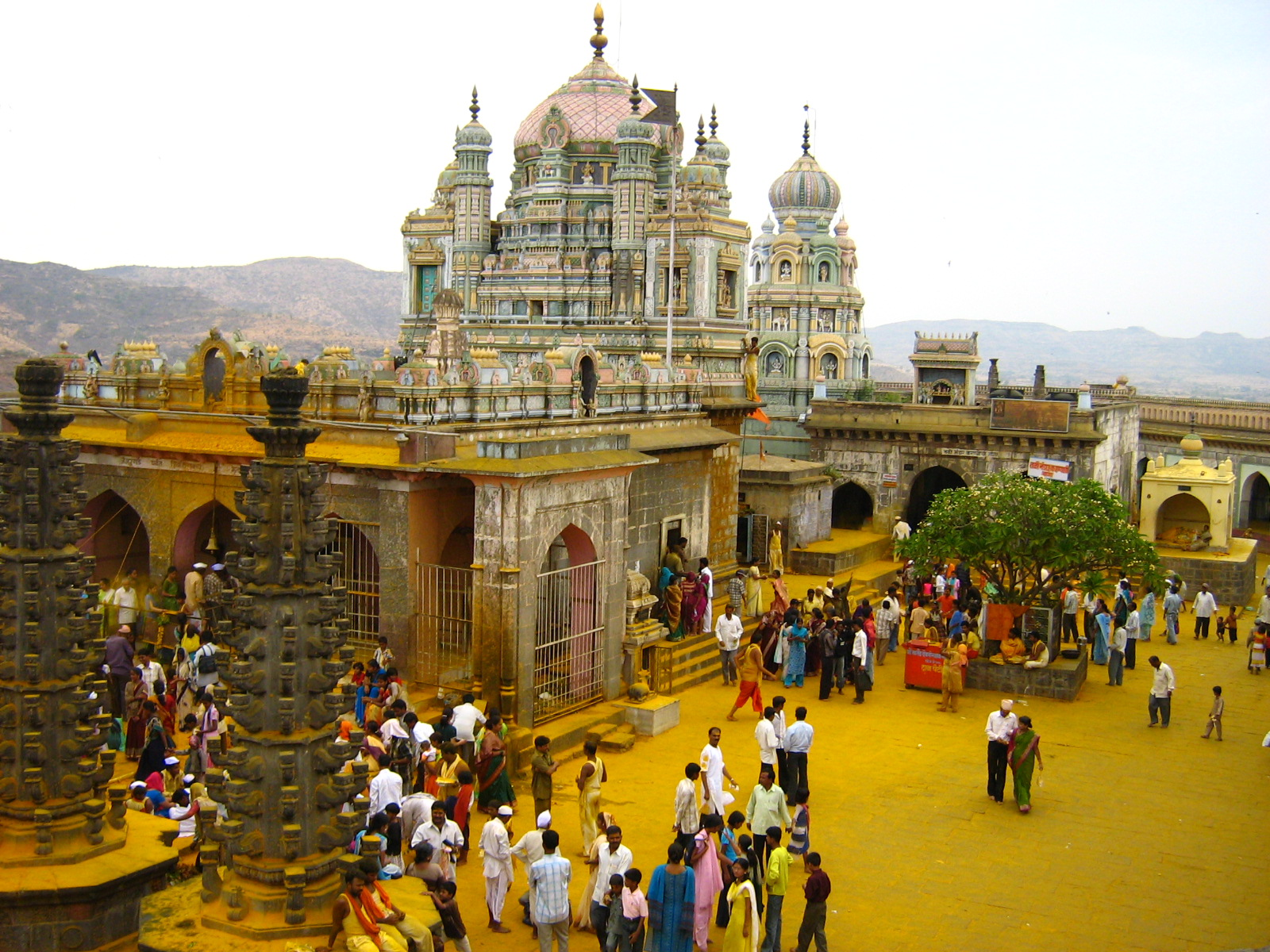
The Principal temple of God Khandoba, the family deity for many Marathi Hindu families

- Alandi -The town attracts millions of devotees annually to the resting place or (Samadhi) of the 13th century Marathi Bhakti saint, Sant Dnyaneshwar
- Bhimashankar -Bhimashankar is one of the twelve Jyotirlinga Shiva temples in India. It is located high in the Sahyadri mountains, 127 km from Pune. Bhīmāshankar is also the source of the Bhima River, the main tributary of the Krishna River.
- Dehu - The town on the banks of the indrayani river is associated with Tukaram, the 17th-century poet-saint of the Bhakti movement in Maharashtra. The town is visited by hundreds of thousands of people for the annual Pandharpur Wari when the paduka (symbolic sandals) of the saint are carried to Pandharpur in a palkhi.
- Nira Narsingpur - The town has an historic temple dedicated to Lord Narasimha, an Avatar. The temple is located close to the ghat at the confluence of Bhima River and Nira River, at the south eastern tip of Pune district, in Indapur taluka. Shri Narsimha of Nira Narsingpur is the family deity of many families from Maharashtra and Karnataka
- Jejuri - The town is foremost center of worship of the regional deity of Khandoba It is situated 48 km from Pune, Maharashtra. Khandoba at Jejuri is the family deity of a large number of families from different MarathiHindu communities. There are two temples: the first is an ancient temple known as Kadepathar. Kadepathar is difficult to climb. The second one is the newer and more famous Gad-kot temple, which is easy to climb. Both temples are fort-like structures.
- Bhuleshwar temple - A 13th century Shiva temple on top of a hill. It is 45 kilometres from city of Pune and 10 km from Pune Solapur highway from Yawat. The temple is unique as its architecture is Islamic from outside and appears more as a mosque than a temple due to its resemblance of a circular tomb and minarets.
- Morya Gosavi - Ganesh temple and tomb of Morya Gosavi at Chinchwad

=== Ashtavinayak temples ===
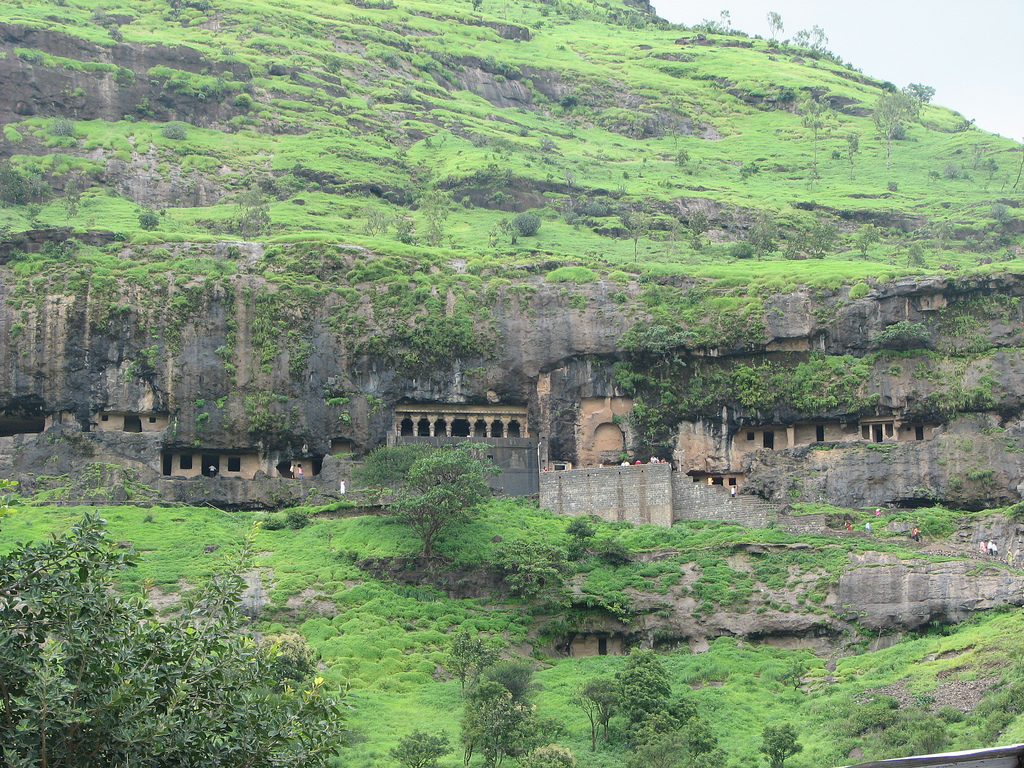
Lenyadri temple in an ancient former Buddhist cave

Ashtavinayak refers to eight Ganesh temples in Pune district and adjacent areas. Each of these temples has its own individual legend and history. Five of these temples are situated in Pune district.

- Girijatmak of Lenyadri - This temple is in a former Buddhist cave on a hilltop near Junnar
- Moreshwar of Morgaon
- Mahaganesh of Ranjangaon
- Chintamani of Theur -This temple is closest Ashtavinayak temple to the city.
- Vigneshwara of Ozar - This temple is about 85 km from Pune.

=== New temples ===
Many new temples have been built in the Pune metro area and other parts of the district in recent years by different Hindu sects. Amongst these the large and notable ones are:

- BAPS Shri Swaminarayan Mandir in Ambegaon
- Dagdusheth Halwai Ganpati Temple
- ISKON NVCC temple in Kondhwa
- Prati Balaji temple at Ketkawale near Narayanpur
- Ramdhara temple near Loni Kalbhor
- Ramakrishna Math in Dattawadi- Founded in 1984 near the hills of Parvati & was Inaugurated on Ram Navami in 2002 By Swami Ranganathananda
