= Siddhivinayak Temple, Siddhatek =

Hindu temple dedicated to Ganesha in Siddhatek India

Siddhi Vinayak Temple
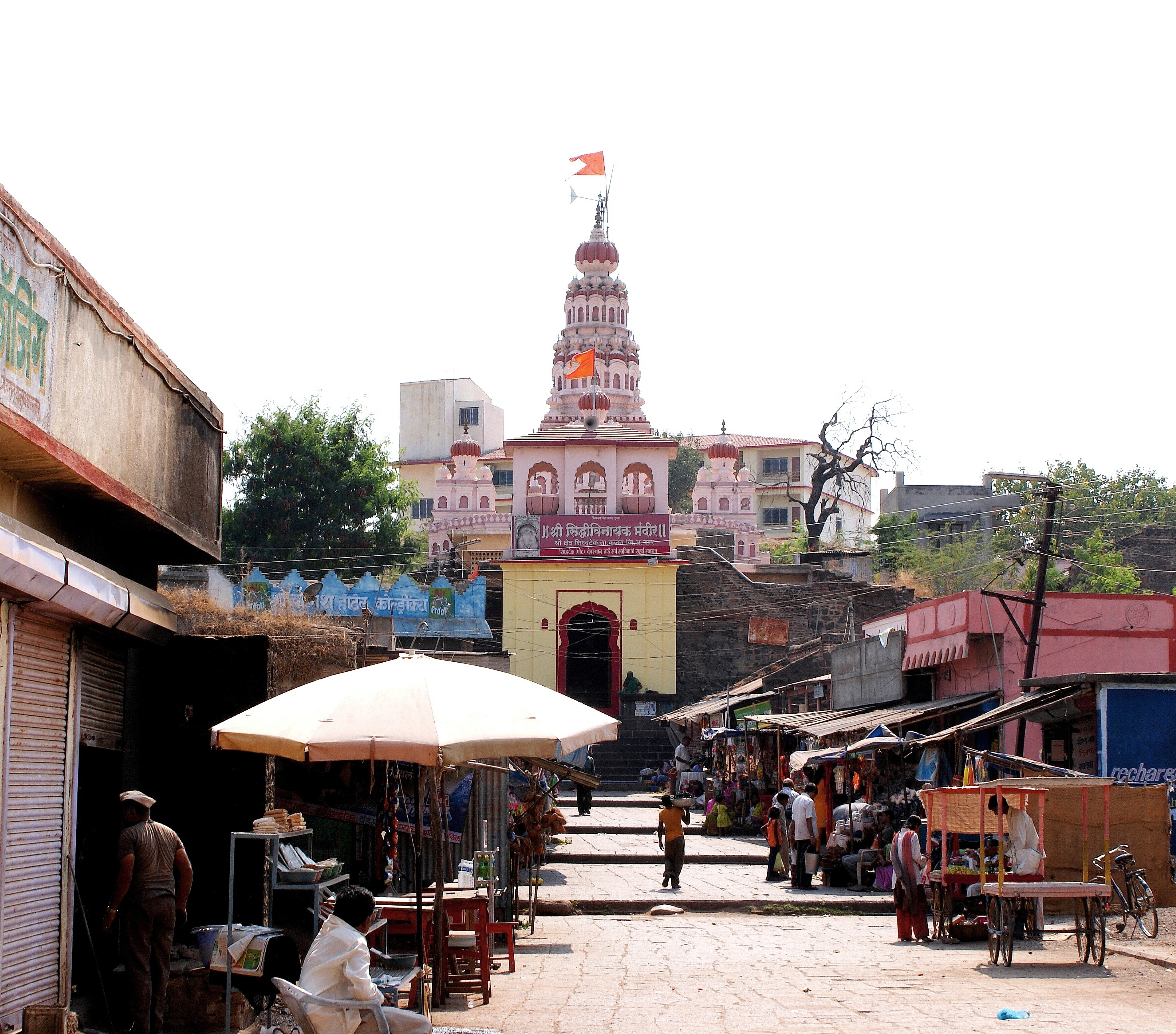
- The temple and the paveway leading to it

- Location within Maharashtra

Religion
- Affiliation: Hinduism
- District: Ahilyanagar District
- Deity: Ganesha as Siddhivinayak
- Festivals: Ganesh Chaturthi, Ganesh Jayanti

Location
- Location: Siddhatek
- State: Maharashtra
- Country: India
- Interactive map of Siddhi Vinayak Temple
- Coordinates: 18°26′38.81″N 74°43′34.53″E

Architecture
- Type: Mandir architecture
- Creator: Ahilyabai Holkar
- Established: Before 17th century
- Completed: 18th century

The Siddhivinayak Temple of Siddhatek is a Hindu temple dedicated to Ganesha, the elephant-headed god of wisdom. The temple third of the Ashtavinayaka, the eight self formed (swayambu) shrines of Ganesha in the Indian state of Maharashtra and the only Ashtavinayaka shrine in Ahmednagar district.

== Location ==
The temple is located on the northern bank of the river Bhima in Siddhatek in the Karjat taluka of Ahmednagar district. The nearest station is Daund (19 km). The temple is accessible from the small village of Shirapur in Pune district, on the southern bank of the river, from where it can be reached by boat or newly constructed bridge. Other routes are (48 km) Daund-Kasti-Padgaon, Shirur-Shrigonda-Siddhatek, Karjat-Rashin-Siddhatek

The temple stands on a hillock, surrounded by thick foliage of Babul trees and is located approximately 1 km from the core Siddhatek village. To propitiate the deity, devotees often perform pradakshina (Circumambulation) of the hillock seven times, even though there is no paved road and the path passes through thorny shrubs.

== Religious importance ==
Though Siddhatek is prescribed to the second temple to be visited in the Ashtavinayak circuit after the foremost Morgaon, pilgrims often visit it third after Morgaon and Theur, as it is a more convenient route.

The Ganesha icon here is with his trunk turned to the right. Usually, the trunk of Ganesha is depicted turned to his left. It is believed that the right-trunked Ganesha is very powerful, but difficult to please. This is the only Ashtavinayaka shrine where the deity has his trunk to the right. Traditionally, an icon whose trunk is to the right is named "Siddhi-Vinayaka", the giver of siddhi ("accomplishment, success", "supernatural powers"). The temple is thus considered as a jagrut kshetra where the deity is said to highly powerful.

The Mudgala Purana narrates that at the beginning of Creation, the creator-god Brahma emerges from a lotus, that rises the god Vishnu's navel as Vishnu sleeps in his yoganidra. While Brahma starts creating the universe, two demons Madhu and Kaitabha rise from the dirt in Vishnu's ear. The demons disturb Brahma's process of creation, thereby compelling Vishnu to awake. Vishnu battles the battle, but cannot defeat them. He asks the god Shiva the reason for this. Shiva informs Vishnu that he cannot succeed as he had forgotten to invoke Ganesha – the god of beginning and obstacle removal – before the fight. Therefore, Vishnu performs penance at Siddhatek, invoking Ganesha with his mantra – "Om Sri Ganeshaya Namah". Pleased, Ganesha bestows his blessings and various siddhis ("powers") on Vishnu, returns to his fight and slays the demons. The place where Vishnu acquired siddhis was thereafter known as Siddhatek.

== History ==
The original temple is believed to be built by Vishnu, however it was destroyed over time. Later, a cowherd is believed to have had a vision of the ancient temple and found the icon of Siddhi-vinayaka. The cowherd worshipped the deity and soon others learned of the shrine.

The present temple was built in the late 18th century by Ahilyabai Holkar, the Philosopher Queen of Indore, who built and renovated many Hindu temples. Sardar Haripant Phadke, an official with the Peshwa rulers, built the Nagarkhana - a chamber which stores Nagaras (kettle drums) and a paved pathway to the main door of the temple. Haripant Phadke got his post as commander-in-chief back after praying to the deity for 21 days, daily circumbulating the temple 21 times. The outer sabha-mandapa (hall) – previously built by Mairal, a landlord from Baroda – was broken in 1939 and was rebuilt in 1970.

The Ganapatya, a sect that worships Ganesha as the Supreme Being, Saint Morya Gosavi (dated between 13th to 17th century), and his son Narayan Maharaj are described as having worshipped at the temple, where they attained siddhi.

Currently, the temple is under the administration of the Chinchwad Devasthan Trust, which also governs Morgaon and Theur Ashtavinayak temples.

== Architecture ==
The temple - constructed in black stone - faces north. The temple has sabha-mandapa (assembly hall) of black stone and another sabha-mandapa, which is a later addition. The threshold of the main shrine has a small demonic head sculpture. The temple also has a Nagarkhana.

The garbhagriha (sanctum) is 15 ft high and 10 ft wide. It has the Jaya-Vijaya – the gatekeepers of Vishnu's abode – brass sculptures flanking the central icon of Siddhivinayaka. It has a dome-shaped stone ceiling. Like all Ashtavinayaka shrines, the central Ganesha image is believed to be svayambhu (self-existent), naturally occurring in the form of an elephant-faced stone. The central icon of Siddhi-Vinayaka is seated cross-legged with his consort Siddhi seated nearby, though often she is hidden with flower garlands and the sindoor paste that covers the image. The icon is sheathed in brass and with its trunk turned to the right. The sanctum also has a Shiva-panchayatana (Shiva surrounded by Ganesha, Vishnu, the Goddess and the Sun-god Surya) and a shrine to goddess Shivai.

== Festivals ==
The temple celebrates three main festivals. The Ganesh Chaturthi festival is celebrated from the first to the fifth day of the Hindu month of Bhadrapada, where Ganesh Chaturthi is the fourth day. A festival is held to commemorate the birthday of Ganesha – Ganesha Jayanti, on the fourth day of the Hindu month of Magha. This festival is celebrated from the first to the fifth day of Magha. The palkhi of Ganesha is taken for three consecutive days in these festivals.

A festival and fair is also held on Vijayadashami and Somavati Amavasya, a no-moon day that falls on a Monday.
