= List of places of worship in Maharashtra =

== Hinduism ==
=== Temples of Deities ===
- Shri Vitthal Temple, Pandharpur, Solapur district
- Shri Mayureshwar Temple, Morgaon, Pune district
- Shri Siddhivinayak Temple, Siddhatek, Ahmednagar district
- Shri Ballaleshwar Temple, Pali, Raigad district
- Shri Varadavinayak Temple, Mahad, Raigad district
- Shri Chintamani Temple, Theur, Pune district
- Shri Girijatmaj Temple, Lenyadri, Pune district
- Shri Vighneshwar Temple, Ozar, Pune district
- Shri Mahaganapati Temple, Ranjangaon, Pune district
- Shri Mahalakshmi Temple, Kolhapur, Kolhapur District
- Mata Renuka Devi Temple, Mahur, Nanded district
- Shri Saptashrungi Temple, Vani, Nashik district
- Shri Tulja Bhavani Temple, Tuljapur, Osmanabad district
- Shri Shani Temple, Shani Shingnapur, Ahmednagar district
- Shri Khandoba Temple, Jejuri, Pune district
- Shri Grishneshwar Jyotirlinga Temple, Verul, Aurangabad District
- Shri Bhimashankar Jyotirlinga Temple, Khed taluka, Pune district
- Shri Trimbakeshwar Shiva Temple, Trimbak, Nashik District

=== Temples of Saints ===
- Shri Sant Dnyaneshwar Maharaj Samadhi Mandir, Alandi, Pune district
- Shri Sant Chokhamela Maharaj Samadhi, Pandharpur, Solapur district
- Shri Sant Eknath Maharaj Samadhi, Paithan, Aurangabad district
- Shri Sant Tukaram Maharaj Samadhi Mandir, Dehu, Pune district
- Shri Sant Nivruttinath Maharaj Samadhi, Trimbakeshwar, Nashik district
- Shri Sant Sai Baba Mandir, Shirdi, Ahmednagar district
- Shri Sant Gajanan Maharaj Mandir, Shegaon, Buldhana District

== Islam ==
- Haji Ali Dargah, Worli, Mumbai

== Jainism ==
- The Jain monuments, Ellora Caves, Aurangabad district
- Jain Temple, Kumbhoj, Kolhapur district
- Jain Temples, Mangi-Tungi, Nashik district
- Godiji Parshwanth Temple, Mumbai
- Gajpanth, Nashik district

== Sikhism ==
- Hazur Sahib, Nanded district

== Judaism ==
- Knesset Eliyahoo Synagogue, Fort, Mumbai
- Shaar Harahamim Synagogue, Masjid Bhandar, Mumbai
- Magen David Synagogue, Byculla, Mumbai

== Christianity ==
- Church of Our Lady of Health, Cavel, Mumbai
- St. Andrew's Church, Mumbai
- St. John the Baptist Church, SEEPZ Industrial Area, Andheri, Mumbai
- St. John the Baptist Church, Marol, Mumbai
- St. John the Baptist Church, Thane
