= Sukhakarta Dukhaharta =

Marathi song devoted to the Hindu god Ganesha

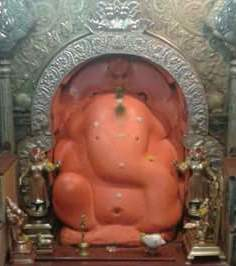
Ganesha as Mayureshwara with consorts Riddhi and Siddhi, Morgaon. Samarth Ramdas composed the arati inspired by Mayureshwara.

Sukhakarta Dukhaharta (literally "harbinger of happiness and dispeller of distress", Marathi: सुखकर्ता दु:खहर्ता, sukhakartā duḥkhaharta), also spelled as Sukhkarta Dukhharta, is a popular Marathi arati, song or bhajan (devotional song) dedicated to the Hindu god Ganesha, composed by the saint Samarth Ramdas (1608 - 1682 CE). It is included in the "most standard and almost universal" aarti songs sung at the start of Puja (worship rituals) of Ganesha in Maharashtra, especially in his festival Ganesh Chaturthi as well as in Ganesha temples in the region.

== Background ==
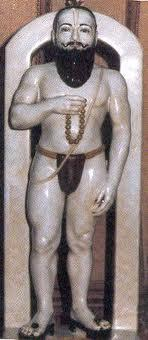
Samarth Ramdas, the poet.

Ganesha is the Hindu god of wisdom, knowledge and new beginnings. He is depicted with an elephant head. Samarth Ramadas was inspired to compose the arati by seeing the icon of Mayureshwara (a form of Ganesha) at Morgaon Ganesha Temple, the chief shrine in the Ashtavinayaka pilgrimage circuit, consisting of eight Ganesha temples around Pune. The arati is composed in the raga (musical mode) Jogiya (Jogia).

Pratapaditya Pal describes the "addresses and references" to Ganesha in the song as "remarkable", considering Samarth Ramdas's patron deity was Rama, not Ganesha.

The genre of arati songs is written in vernacular languages, as opposed the hymns of Hindu religious rituals and mantras, which are in Sanskrit. These songs are sung at the finale of the Puja (worship rituals), while a worshipper offers light to the god. This is done by waving a plate with oil- or ghee-soaked lit wicks in front of the icon.

== Contents and commentary ==
Sukhakarta Dukhaharta contains three stanzas as well as a chorus stanza that is repeated after every stanza.

सुखकर्ता दुखहर्ता, वार्ता विघ्नांची।
नुरवी; पुरवी प्रेम, कृपा जयाची।
सर्वांगी सुंदर, उटी शेंदुराची।
कंठी झळके माळ, मुक्ताफळांची॥१॥

The first stanza begins by addressing Ganesha as harbinger of happiness and dispeller of distress/sorrow and obstacles. It implores the beautiful-bodied, saffron coloured god who wears a pearl necklace to come and bless the singer (devotee) and fill his life with love. Lokprabha comments the word nuravi (नुरवी) is often mispronounced as nurvi (नुर्वी) in the stanza.

जय देव, जय देव जय मंगलमूर्ती|
दर्शनमात्रे मन कामना पुरती ॥धृ॥

The chorus starts with "Victory to God! Victory to God!" and praises Ganesha as Mangalamurti, one with an auspicious form. The mere sight of the god is said to fulfil all desires.

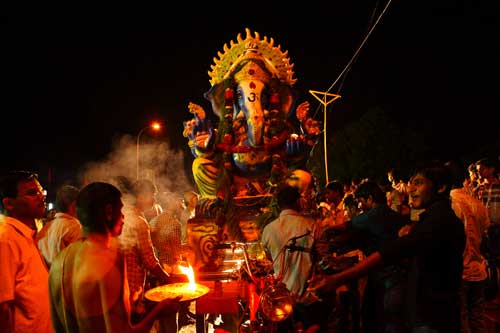
A priest (left, bottom) performs aarti of Ganesha.

रत्नखचित फरा, तुज गौरीकुमरा|
चंदनाची उटी, कुमकुम केशरा|
हिरेजडित मुकुट, शोभतो बरा |
रुणझुणती नूपुरे, चरणी घागरिया|
जय देव जय देव जय मंगलमूर्ती ॥२॥

The second stanza extols Ganesha, as the son of Gauri (Parvati, Ganesha's mother) adorned with jewels. His forehead is smeared with sandalwood, saffron and kumkum. He wears a diamond-studded crown and anklets that shine and jingle melodiously. The chorus is then repeated.

लंबोदर पीतांबर, फणिवरबंधना |
सरळ सोंड, वक्रतुंड त्रिनयना|
दास रामाचा, वाट पाहे सदना|
संकटी पावावे, निर्वाणी रक्षावे, सुरवरवंदना|
जय देव जय देव, जय मंगलमूर्ती|
दर्शनमात्रे मनकामना पुरती ॥३॥

The last stanza praises Ganesha as One who with a pot belly, who wears yellow silken garments. His pot belly is interpreted to have grown his favourite sweet modaks as well as the sins of his devotees, thus absolving them. A serpent is around his waist. He has three eyes and a soft trunk. His third eye is interpreted to the source of knowledge. Lokprabha notes that the third eye, usually not depicted in Ganesha's iconography, is seen in the Ganesha of Morgaon. He is called Vakratunda, "One with a curved trunk". Another translation of the word means one who destroys the crooked. In the second last line, the poet's name is given: "Your humble servant Ramadas waits for you to come". Further, the song requests Ganesha, the Lord who worshipped by all, to be pleased with the devotee in trouble and protect him in distress. The chorus is repeated.

== Contemporary versions ==
External videos
- Lata Mangeshkar version

The collection of Ganesha aratis, including the "timeless" Sukhakarta Dukhakarta by singer-sister Lata Mangeshkar and Usha Mangeshkar, became popular on release in the 1970s. Anuradha Paudwal has the song in her music album Ganesh mantra. The song was used as the theme song for a Rock music concert by musicians Vishal Rane and Sameer Bangare. The song was adapted for the movie Bajirao Mastani and helped set the world record for the largest formation of human mosaic of the form of the God.
