= Ashtavinayaka =

Pilgrimage to eight Indian Hindu temples

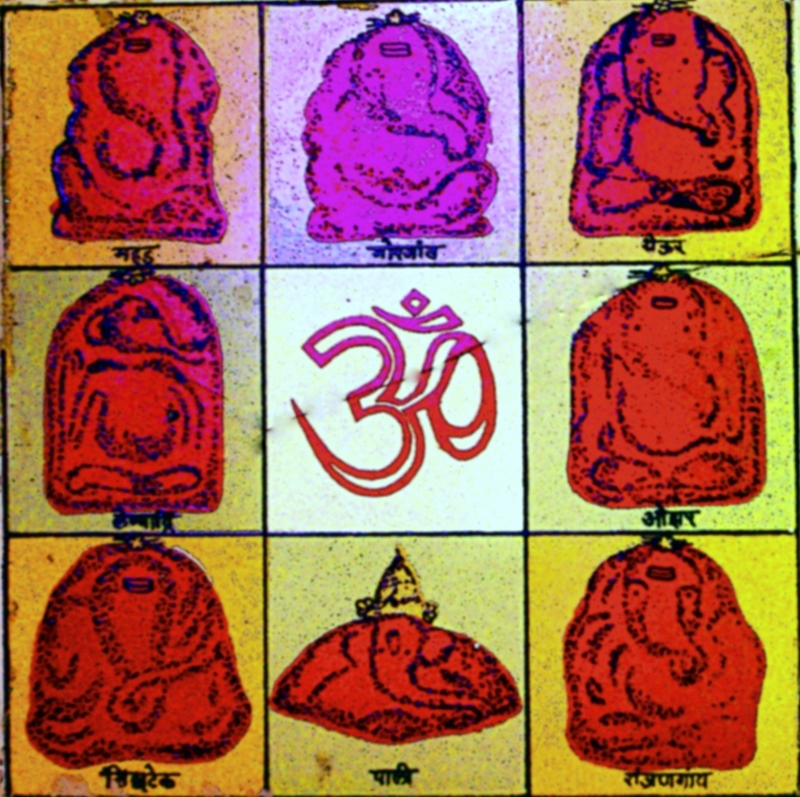
Ashtavinayaka with an Om featured in the centre

Ashtavinayaka (Marathi: अष्टविनायक) is a Sanskrit term which means "eight Ganeshas". The Ashtavinayaka Yatra refers to a pilgrimage to the eight Hindu temples in the state of Maharashtra, India, centered around the city of Pune. The eight temples house eight distinct idols of Ganesha, the Hindu deity of unity, prosperity, learning, and removing obstacles. Each of these temples has its own individual legend and history, as distinct from each other as the murtis in each temple. The form of each murti of Ganesha and his trunk are distinct from one another. There are other temples of eight Ganesha in various other parts of Maharashtra; however, the ones around Pune are more well known and visited. To complete the Ashtavinayaka Yatra, one must revisit the first temple after visiting all the eight temples.

The Ashtavinayaka Yatra is a pilgrimage covering these eight holy abodes of Ganesha in and around Pune and Raigad districts of Maharashtra. Out of these 8 Temples, 5 are in Pune district, 2 are in Raigad district and 1 is in Ahmednagar (Ahilyanagar) District. Ganesha is worshiped first before any other worship service is carried out to any other deity. The pilgrimage takes 3 days to complete. As per scriptures travel starts from Moreswar in Moregaon then Siddhivinayak temple of Siddhatek, Pali, Mhad, Theur Chintamani Ganesh in Pune, Lenyandri, Ozar, Ranjangaon then back to Moregaon where pilgrimage had started.

== Temples ==
Location of Ashtavinayak Temples along with Pune in Maharashtra

The eight temples/idols of the Ashtavinayaka in their religious sequence are:

Ashtavinayaka Temples
#	Temple	Location
1	Mayureshwar Temple	Morgaon, Pune district
2	Siddhivinayak Temple	Siddhatek, Ahmednagar district
3	Ballaleshwar Temple	Pali, Raigad district
4	Varadavinayak Temple	Mahad, Raigad district
5	Chintamani Temple	Theur, Pune district
6	Girijatmaj Temple	Lenyadri, Pune district
7	Vighneshwar Temple	Ozar, Pune district
8	Mahaganapati Temple	Ranjangaon, Pune district

Traditionally, Moreshwar of Moregaon is the first temple visited by the pilgrims. The temples should be visited in this order Moregaon, Siddhatek, Pali, Mahad, Theur, Lenyandri, Ozar, Ranjangaon. The pilgrimage is concluded with a second visit to Moregaon.

All these murtis are called svayambhu idols in Sanskrit (self-originating/self-existent images, and not carved images).

=== Mayureshwar ===
This is the most important temple on this pilgrimage. The temple, built from black-stone during the Bahamani reign, has four gates (it is supposed to have been built by one of the knights named Mr. Gole, from the court of Bidar's Sultan). The temple is situated in the centre of the village. The temple is covered from all sides by four minarets and gives the impression of a mosque if seen from a distance. This was done to prevent attacks on the temple during Mughal periods. The temple has a 50-foot tall wall around it.

There is a Nandi (Shiva's bull mount) sitting in front of this temple entrance, which is unique, as Nandi is normally in front of only Shiva temples. However, the story says that this statue was being carried to some Shivamandir during which the vehicle carrying it broke down and the Nandi statue could not be removed from its current place.

The murti of Ganesha, riding a peacock, in the form of Mayureshwara is believed to have slain the demon Sindhu at this spot. The idol, with its trunk turned to the left, has a cobra (Nagaraja) poised over it protecting it. This form of Ganesha also has two other murtis of Siddhi (Capability) and Riddhi (Intelligence).

However, this is not the original murti -which is said to have been consecrated twice by Brahma, once before and once after being destroyed by the asura Sindhurasur. The original murti, smaller in size and made of atoms of sand, iron, and diamonds, was supposedly enclosed in a copper sheet by the Pandavas and placed behind the one that is currently worshipped.

The cited temple is the Morgaon Temple, one of the Ashtavinayaka temples in Maharashtra, India. It is located in the village of Morgaon, some 55 kilometres from Pune, along the Karha River. The name of the village is taken from the Marathi word for peacock, and it is claimed to be laid out in the shape of a peacock.

The Ashtavinayaka temples are a significant pilgrimage circuit dedicated to Lord Ganesha in Maharashtra. This circuit's temples are each associated with a different mythology and divinity. Morgaon Temple is one of these eight temples, and it is spiritually and culturally significant to Lord Ganesha worshippers.

=== Siddhivinayak ===
According to regional legend, Vishnu is believed to have vanquished the asuras Madhu and Kaitabha after propitiating Ganesha here.

This is the only murti of these eight with the trunk positioned to the right.

It is believed that the two saints Shri Morya Gosavi and Shri Narayan Maharaj of Kedgaon received their enlightenment here.

The temple is North-facing and is on a small hillock. The main road towards the temple was believed to be built by Peshwa's general Haripant Phadake. The inner sanctum, 15 feet high and 10 feet wide is built by Punyashloka Ahilyabai Holkar. The idol is 3 feet tall and 2.5 feet wide. The idol faces North-direction. The stomach of the murti is not wide, but Riddhi and Siddhi murtis are sitting on one thigh. This murti's trunk is turning to the right. The right-sided-trunk Ganesha is supposed to be very strict for the devotees. To make one round (pradakshina) around the temple one has to make the round trip of the hillock. This takes about 30 minutes with moderate speed.

Peshwa general Haripant Phadake lost his General's position and did 21 Pradakshina around the temple. On the 21st day Peshwa's court-man came and took him to the court with royal honor. Haripant promised the God that he will bring the stones of the castle which he will win from the first war he will fight as the general. The stone pathway is built from the Badami-Castle which was attacked by Haripant soon after he became the general.

This temple is situated off the Pune-Solapur highway about 48 km from the town of Srigonda in Ahmadnagar district. The temple is situated next to Bhima river. On Pune-Solapur railway, Daund Railway station is 18 km from here.

=== Ballaleshwar ===
Ganesha is believed to have saved this boy-devotee, Ballala, who was beaten by local villagers and his father (Kalyani-seth) for his single-minded devotion to him.

The original wooden temple was reconstructed into a stone temple by Nana Phadanavis in 1760. There are two small lakes constructed on two sides of the temple. One of them is reserved for the puja (worship) of the Deity.

This Temple faces the east and has two sanctums. The inner one houses the murti and has a Mushika (Ganesha's mouse vahana) with modaka in his forepaws in front of it. The hall, supported by eight exquisitely carved pillars demands as much attention as the idol, sitting on throne carved like a cypress tree. The eight pillars depict the eight directions. Inner sanctum is 15 feet tall and outer one is 12 feet tall. The temple is constructed in such a way that after the winter (dakshinayan : southward movement of the sun) solstice, the sun rays fall on the Ganesha murti at sunrise. The temple is built with stones which are stuck together very tight using melted lead.

Like a few other murtis, this one has diamonds embedded in the eyes and navel, and with His trunk pointing to the left.

One speciality of this temple is that the prasad offered to this Ganapati at Pali is Besan Laadu instead of Modak that is normally offered to other Ganapatis.

The shape of the idol itself bears a striking semblance with the mountain which forms the backdrop of this temple. This is more prominently felt if one views the photograph of the mountain and then sees the idol.

The temple is located in the town of Pali, off the Mumbai-Pune highway, about 11 km before Nagothane on the Mumbai-Goa highway. This is located 30 km to the South-West of Karjat Railway Station. Mumbai-Panvel-Khopoli-Pali is 124 km. Pune-Lonavla-Khopoli-Pali is 111 km.

Behind this temple is the temple of Shri Dhundi-Vinayak which is West facing. This is a very rare idol which is facing the West. The story says that this idol was the same one which was thrown by Ballala's father (Kalyani-seth) while Ballala was worshipping it.

History of Temple

Ganesha Purana gives an elaborate picture of LEELAS of Ganesha. The legendary story of Ballaleshwar is covered in Upasana Khand Section -22 occurred in Pali – the old name Pallipur.

Kalyansheth was a merchant in Pallipur and was married to Indumati. The couple was childless for quite some time but later had a son known as Ballal. As Ballal grew, he spent much of his time in worshiping and praying. He was devotee of Ganesha and used to worship stone idol of Ganesha in the forest along with his friends and companions. As it used to take time, the friends would reach home late. Regular delay in returning house used to irritate the parents of the friends of Ballal who complained to his father saying that Ballal was responsible for spoiling the kids. Already unhappy with Ballal for not concentrating on his studies, Kalyansheth was boiling with anger when he heard the complaint. Immediately he reached the place of worship in the forest and devastated Pooja arrangements organized by Ballal and his friends. He threw away the Stone Idol of Ganesha and broke the pandal. All the kids were frightened but Ballal who was engrossed in Pooja and japa, did not notice the event. Kalayan beat Ballal mercilessly and tied him to the tree saying to get fed and freed by Ganesha. He left for home thereafter.

Ballal semiconscious and tied to the tree in the forest was lying as that with severe pain all over, started calling his beloved God, Ganesha.

"O Lord, Ganesha, I was busy in praying you, I was right and humble but my cruel father has spoiled my act of devotion and hence I am unable to perform Pooja."

Ganesha was pleased and responded quickly. Ballal was freed. He blessed Ballal to be superior devotee with larger lifespan. Ganesha hugged Ballal and said that his father would suffer for his wrongdoings.

Ballal insisted that Ganesha should continue to stay there at Pali. Nodding His head Ganesha made his permanent stay at Pali as Ballal Vinayak and disappeared in a large stone. This is famous as Ballaleshwar.

=== Shri Dhundi Vinayak ===
In the above-mentioned story the stone idol which Ballal used to worship and which was thrown away by Kalyan Sheth is known as Dhundi Vinayak. The idol is facing west. The birth celebration of Dhundi Vinayak takes place from Jeshtha Pratipada to Panchami. From ancient time, it is a practice to take darshan of Dhundi Vinayak before proceeding to main idol Shree Ballaleshwar.

=== Varadavinayak ===
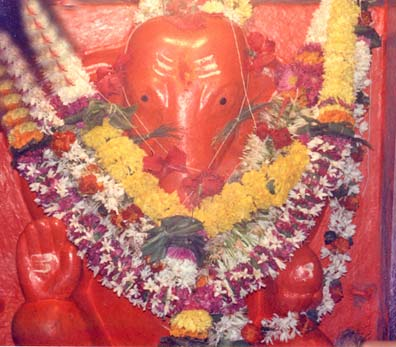
Shri Varada Vinayak, Mahad

The handsome Prince Rukmangad refused sage Vachaknavi's wife Mukunda's illicit call, and was cursed to suffer from leprosy. Mukunda was satisfied by Indra who deceived her as Rukmangad and she bore a child by name Grutsamad. When Grutsamad discovered the truth, he cursed his mother Mukunda to become the tree of Bori and she in turn cursed him to bear a demon son named Tripurasur, the one who was defeated by Shiva after praying the Ranjangaon Ganesha. Grutsamad after being cursed went to the forest of Pushpak and worshipped Ganesha. Sage Grutsamad is famous for the mantra GaNanaN Tva. He founded the temple and called this Ganesha: Varada-Vinayak.

Ganesha is said to reside here in the form of Varada Vinayaka, the giver of bounty and success. The idol was found in the adjoining lake (to Mr. Dhondu Paudkar in 1690AD), in an immersed position and hence its weathered look. In 1725AD the then Kalyan subhedar, Mr. Ramji Mahadev Biwalkar built the Varadavinayak temple and the village of Mahad.

The idol faces the east, has its trunk to the left and has been in the constant company of an oil lamp - said to be burning continuously since 1892. There are four elephant idols on four sides of the temple. The hall is 8 feet by 8 feet. The dome is 25feet high and is golden at the top. The dome has designs of cobra.

This is the only temple where devotees are allowed to personally pay their homage and respects to the idol. They are allowed in the immediate vicinity of this idol to perform their prayers.

The temple is located three kilometers off the Mumbai-Pune highway near Khopoli (80 km from Pune), and is thus closest to Mumbai city. Karjat Railway Station, Karjat on Mumbai-Pune railway is 24 km from this place and 6 km from Khopoli.

=== Chintamani ===
Ganesha is believed to have got back the precious Chinatamani jewel from the greedy Guna for sage Kapila at this spot. However, after bringing back the jewel, sage Kapila put it in Vinayaka's (Ganesha's) neck. Thus the name Chintamani Vinayak. This happened under the Kadamb tree, therefore Theur is known as Kadambanagar in old times.

The lake behind the temple is called Kadambteertha. The temple entrance is North facing. The outer wooden hall was built by Peshwas. The main temple is supposed to have been built by Dharanidhar Maharaj Dev from the family-lineage of Shri Moraya Gosavi. He must have built this around 100 years before Senior Shrimant Madhavrao Peshwa built the outer wooden hall.

This idol also has a left trunk, with carbuncle and diamonds as its eyes. The idol faces east.

Theur's Chintamani was the family deity of Shrimant Madhavrao I Peshwa. He suffered from tuberculosis and died at a very young age (~27 years). He is supposed to have died in this temple. His wife, Ramabai committed Sati with him on 18 November 1772.

The temple is located 22 km from Pune, off the Pune-Solapur highway, and is hence the nearest from Pune. The village of Theur sits at the confluence of three major regional rivers—Mula, Mutha & Bhima.

=== Girijatmaj ===
It is believed that Parvati (Shiva's wife) performed penance to beget Ganesha at this point. Girija's (Parvati's) Atmaj (son) is Girijatmaj. This temple stands amidst a cave complex of 18 caves of Buddhist origin. This temple is the eighth cave. These are called Ganesha-leni as well. The temple is carved out of a single stone hill, which has 307 steps. The temple features a wide hall with no supporting pillars. The temple hall is 53 feet long, 51 feet wide and 7 feet high.

The idol faces north with its trunk to the left, and has to be worshipped from the rear of the temple. The temple faces south. This idol seems little different from the rest of the Ashtavinayaka idols in a sense that it appears to be poorly designed or carved like the other idols. This idol can be worshipped by anyone. There is no electric bulb in the temple. The temple is constructed such that during the day it is always lighted by sunshine.

The temple is situated 12 km from Narayangaon, which is about 94 km from Pune on the Pune-Nashik highway. Nearest railway station is Talegaon. From Junnar, Lenyadri is about 5 km. Shivaneri castle is close by (5 to 6 km) where Chatrapati Shivaji Maharaj was born.

=== Vighneshwar ===
The history encompassing this idol states that Vighnasur, a demon was created by the King of Gods, Indra to destroy the prayer organized by King Abhinandan. However, the demon went a step further and destroyed all vedic, religious acts and to answer the people's prayers for protection, Ganesha defeated him. The story goes on to say that on being conquered, the demon begged and pleaded with Ganesha to show a mercy. Ganesha then granted in his plea, but on the condition that demon should not go to the place where Ganesha worshipping is going on. In return the demon asked a favour that his name should be taken before Ganesha's name, thus the name of Ganesha became Vighnahar or Vighneshwar (Vighna in Sanskrit means a sudden interruption in the ongoing work due to some unforeseen, unwarranted event or cause). The Ganesha here is called Shri Vighneshwar Vinayak.

The temple faces east and is surrounded by a thick stone wall. One can walk on the wall. The main hall of the temple is 20feet long and the inner hall is 10feet long. This idol, facing the east, has its trunk towards the left and rubies in its eyes. There is a diamond on the forehead and some jewel in the navel. Idols of Riddhi and Siddhi are placed on the two sides of the Ganesha idol. The temple top is Golden and is possibly built by Chimaji Appa after defeating the Portuguese rulers of Vasai and Sashti. The temple is probably built around 1785CE.

This temple is located just off the Pune-Nashik Highway, in the town of Ozhar. It is enclosed on all sides by high stone walls, and its pinnacle is made of gold. The temple is situated on the banks of river Kukadi. Via Mumbai-Thane-Kalyan-Bapsai-Saralgaon-Otur, Ozhar is 182 km.

=== Mahaganapati ===
Shiva is believed to have worshipped Ganesha before fighting the demon Tripurasura here. The temple was built by Shiva where he worshipped Ganesha, and the town he set up was called Manipur which is now known as Ranjangaon.

Ranjangaon Ganpati is one among the Ashtavinayaka, celebrating eight instances of legends related to Ganesha. This Temple Ganpati Idol was inaugurated and donated by "Khollam" family one of the Gold Smith family in Ranjangaon. According to the history the temple was built in between 9th and 10th centuries.

While going from the Pune - Nagar highway the route is Pune - Koregaon - then via Shikrapur; Rajangaon is 21 km before Shirur. From Pune it is 50 km.

The idol faces the east, is seated in a cross-legged position with a broad forehead, with its trunk pointing to the left. It is said that the original idol is hidden in the basement, having 10 trunks and 20 hands and is called Mahotkat, however, the temple authorities deny existence of any such idol.

Constructed so that the rays of the sun fall directly on the idol (during the Southward movement of the sun), the temple bears a distinct resemblance to the architecture reminiscent of the 9th and 10th Centuries and faces the east. Shrimant Madhavrao Peshwa used to visit this temple very often and built the stone sanctum around the idol and in 1790 AD Mr. Anyaba Dev was authorised to worship the idol.

The Temple: Mahaganapati is portrayed, seated on a lotus, flanked by his consorts Siddhi and Ridhi. The temple dates back to the period of Peshwa Madhav Rao.

The temple of Maha Ganpati is very close to the centre of the town Ranjangaon. The temple was erected during the rule of the Peshwas. Peshwa Madhavrao had constructed the inner sanctum, to house the swayambhoo (naturally found) idol.

The temple faces east. It has an imposing main gate which is guarded by two statues of Jay and Vijay. The temple is designed in such away that during Dakshinayan, the apparent movement of the sun to the south, the rays of the sun fall directly on the deity.

The deity is seated and flanked on both sides by Riddhi and Siddhi. The trunk of the deity turns to the left. There is a local belief that the real statue of Mahaganpati is hidden in some vault and this statue has ten trunks and twenty arms. But there is nothing to substantiate this belief.

Festivals: As with all other Ashtavinayaka (Ganesha) temples, Ganesha Chaturti is celebrated in great splendor here.

Legend has it that when a sage had once sneezed he gave out a child; since being with the sage the child learnt many good stuff about lord Ganesha, however had inherited many evil thoughts within; when he grew he developed in to a demon by name Tripurasura; thereafter he prayed to Lord Shiva and got three powerful citadels (the evil Tripuram forts) of gold, silver and bronze with a boon of invincibility until all the three are in linear; with the boon to his side he caused suffering to all beings in the heavens and on earth. Upon hearing the fervent appeals of the Gods, Shiva intervened, and realized that he could not defeat the demon. It was upon hearing Narada Muni's advice that Shiva saluted Ganesha and then shot a single arrow that pierced through the citadels, bringing an end to the demon.

Shiva, the slayer of the Tripura citadels is enshrined at Bhimashankaram nearby.

A variation of this legend is commonly known in southern India. Ganesha is said to have caused the axle in Shiva's chariot to break, as the latter headed to battle the demon without saluting Ganesha before he set out. Upon realizing his act of omission, Shiva saluted his son Ganesha, and then proceeded victoriously to a short battle against the powerful demon. (See Acharapakkam - an ancient temple in Tamil Nadu glorified by the 1st millennium Tamil hymns enshrining Shiva associated with this legend, as well as Tiruvirkolam and Tiruvatikai - both over 1200 years old, associated with the legend of Tripurasamhaaram).

(The Tamil lines of 15th century saint poet Arunagirinathar: 'Muppuram eri seida, Acchivan urai ratham, acchadu podi seida athi deera' where he describes Ganesha as the valiant hero, who caused the axle of Shiva's chariot to crumble to dust, as Shiva headed out to destroy Tripurasura, narrate this legend.)

== See also ==
- Sritattvanidhi that describes 32 iconographic forms of Ganesha
