= Ganesh Jayanti =

Hindu festival

Ganesha Jayanti
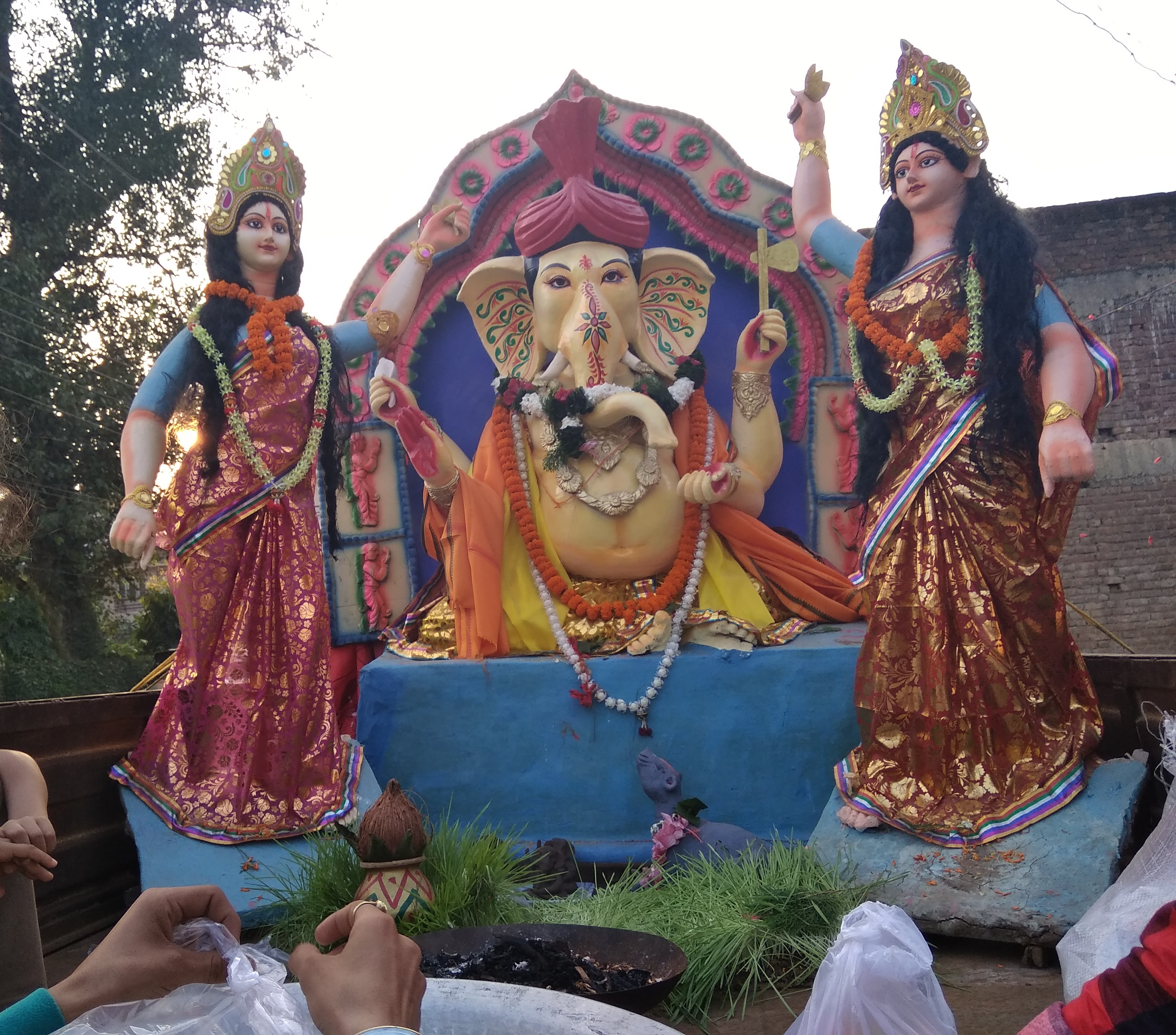
- Traditional setting of idols (Ganesha in the middle) during the festival.
- Also called: Tilo Chauth, Sakat Chauthis, Tilkund chouth
- Observed by: Hindus
- Type: Hindu
- Observances: Veneration of Ganesha
- Date: Shukla paksha chaturthi in Magh month (fourth day of the bright half of moon’s cycle during January/February), decided by Hindu calendar (lunar calendar)
- 2026 date: 22 January (thursday)
- Frequency: Annual
- Related to: Birthday of Ganesha

Ganesh Jayanti (literally "Ganesha's birthday", also known as Bhadra shukla chaturthi, Tilkund chaturthi, and Varad chaturthi, is a Hindu festival. This occasion celebrates the birthday of Ganesha, the lord of wisdom. It is a popular festival particularly in the Indian state of Maharashtra, and it is also celebrated in Goa held during the shukla paksha chaturthi day (fourth day of the bright fortnight or the waxing moon) in the month of Magha as per the Hindu calendar, which corresponds to the Gregorian calendar month of January/February. In 2026, Ganesh Jayanti falls on 22 january.

The distinction between the Ganesh Jayanti and the more popular, almost pan-Indian Ganesh Chaturthi festival is that the latter festival is observed in the month of August/September (Bhadrapada Hindu month). According to one tradition, Ganesh Chaturthi is also considered as the birthday of Ganesha. This festival of Ganesha is also called as the Tilo Chauth or Sakat Chauthis in Uttar Pradesh, where Ganesha is invoked on behalf of the son of a family.

== Observances ==
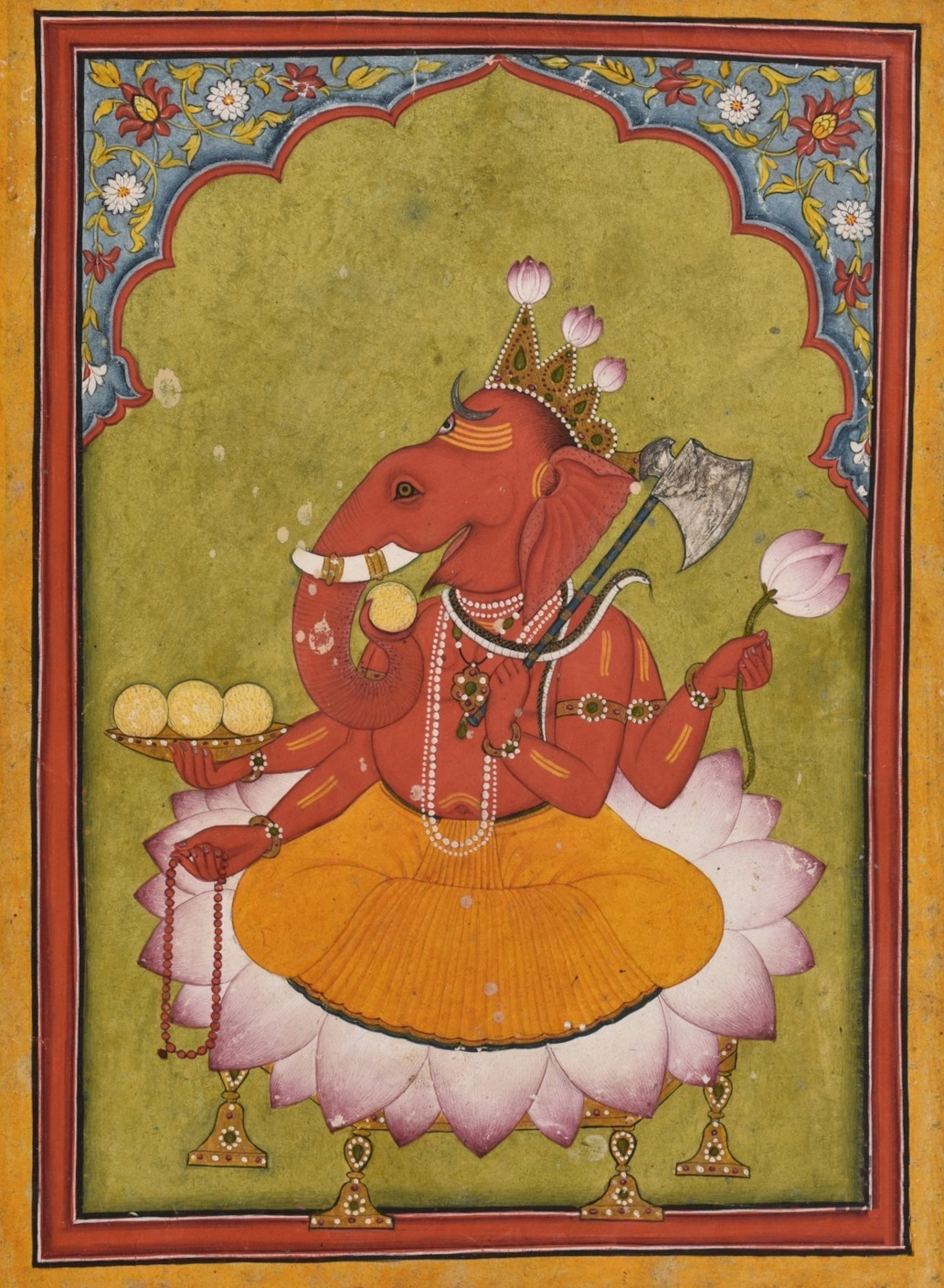
Ganesha, Basohli miniature, circa 1730.

On the festival day, an image of Ganesha, in symbolic conical form is made out of turmeric or sindhoor powder or some times of cowdung and worshipped. It is later immersed in water on the fourth day after the festival. A special preparation made of til (sesame seeds) is offered to Ganesha and then distributed to the devotees as prasad for eating. A fast is observed during worship during the day time followed by feasting in the night as a part of the rituals.

In addition to fasting on this day, before observing the puja rites for Ganesha (also known as "Vinayaka"), devotees take bath with water mixed with til seeds, after smearing a paste made out of til (sesame) on their body. The fast observed on this day is stated to enhance the name and fame of the individual.

Even though Ganesha is considered a celibate god in Uttar Pradesh (in other places, he is considered as "married"), but on the occasion of the Ganesh Jayanti celebrations, couples worship him to beget a son.

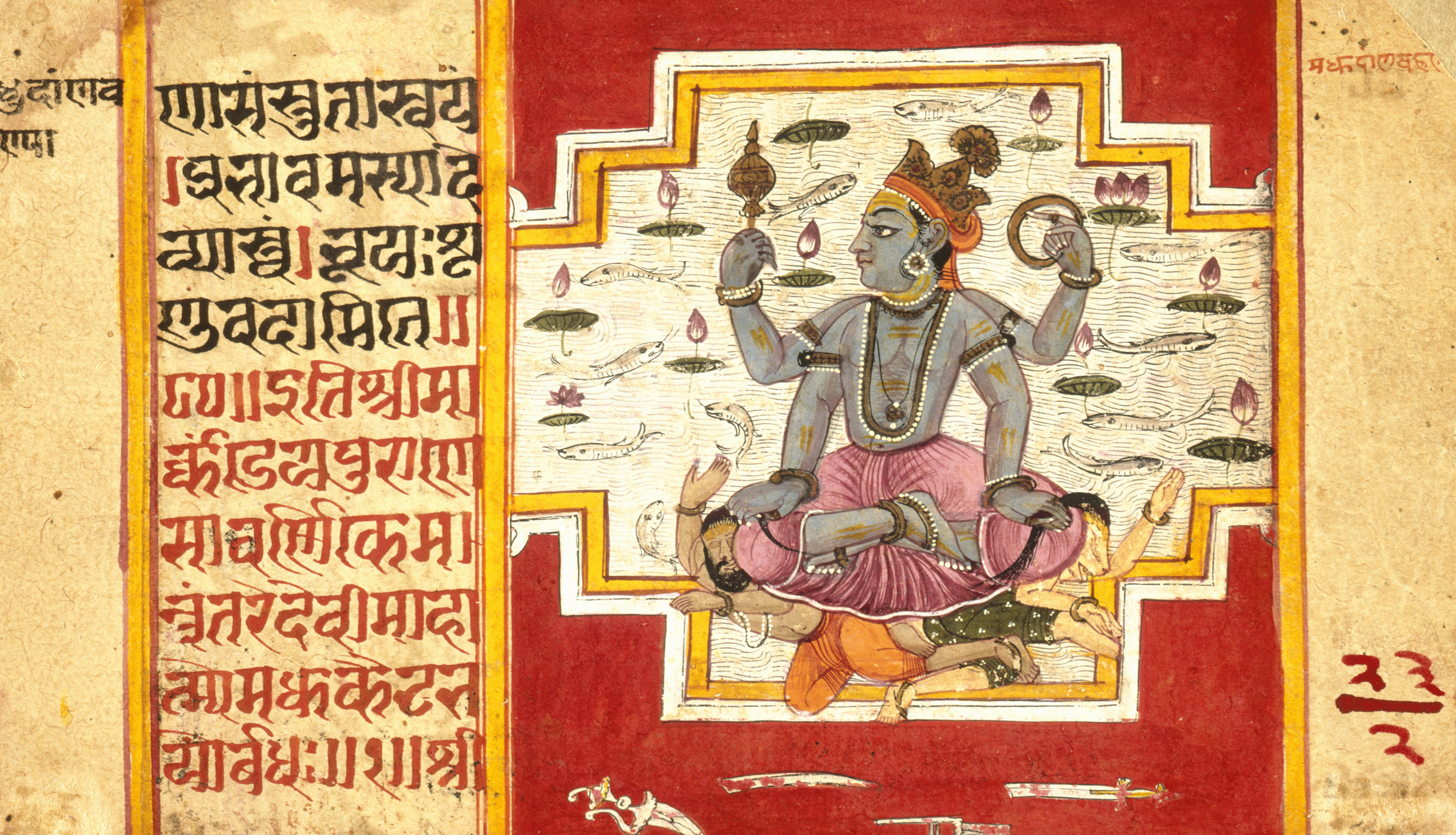
Vishnu fighting Madhu-Kaitabh

On Ganesh Jayanti, devotees flock to the Moreshwar temple in Morgaon, Pune district, Maharashtra – in large numbers. The temple is starting and ending point of a pilgrimage of eight revered Ganesha temples called Ashtavinayaka. Legend has it that Ganesha killed demon Kamlasur at this place, riding a peacock (in Sanskrit, a mayura, in Marathi – mora) and thus is known as Mayureshwar or Moreshwar ("Lord of the peacock"). Another temple on the Ashtavinayak circuit is the Siddhivinayaka temple at Siddhatek, Ahmednagar district, Maharashtra. Large crowds visit the temple on the occasion of Ganesh Jayanti. This ancient temple located on the eastern bank of the Bhima River – has an idol of Ganesha, seated in a crossed leg posture flanked by his consort Siddhi. The Ganesha image is adorned with saffron paste and has its trunk turned to the right, which is considered a rare depiction. Thus, it is held in deep reverence and a strict set of religious vows are observed to please the deity. Devotees take a pradakhsina (circumambulation) of the hill seven times in the rough hilly terrain to seek favour of Ganesha. Legend states that god Vishnu invoked the blessings of Ganesha at this venue before killing the demons Madhu-Kaitabh to put an end to their depredations.

On the Konkan Coast, at Ganpatipule, a beach temple houses a swayambhu (self-manifest) idol of Ganesha, which is much venerated and visited by thousands of devotees every year. The Ganesha deified in this temple is popularly known as the Paschim Dwardevta ("Western sentinel god of India"). Ganesh Jayanti is also celebrated at this Konkan coastal temple.

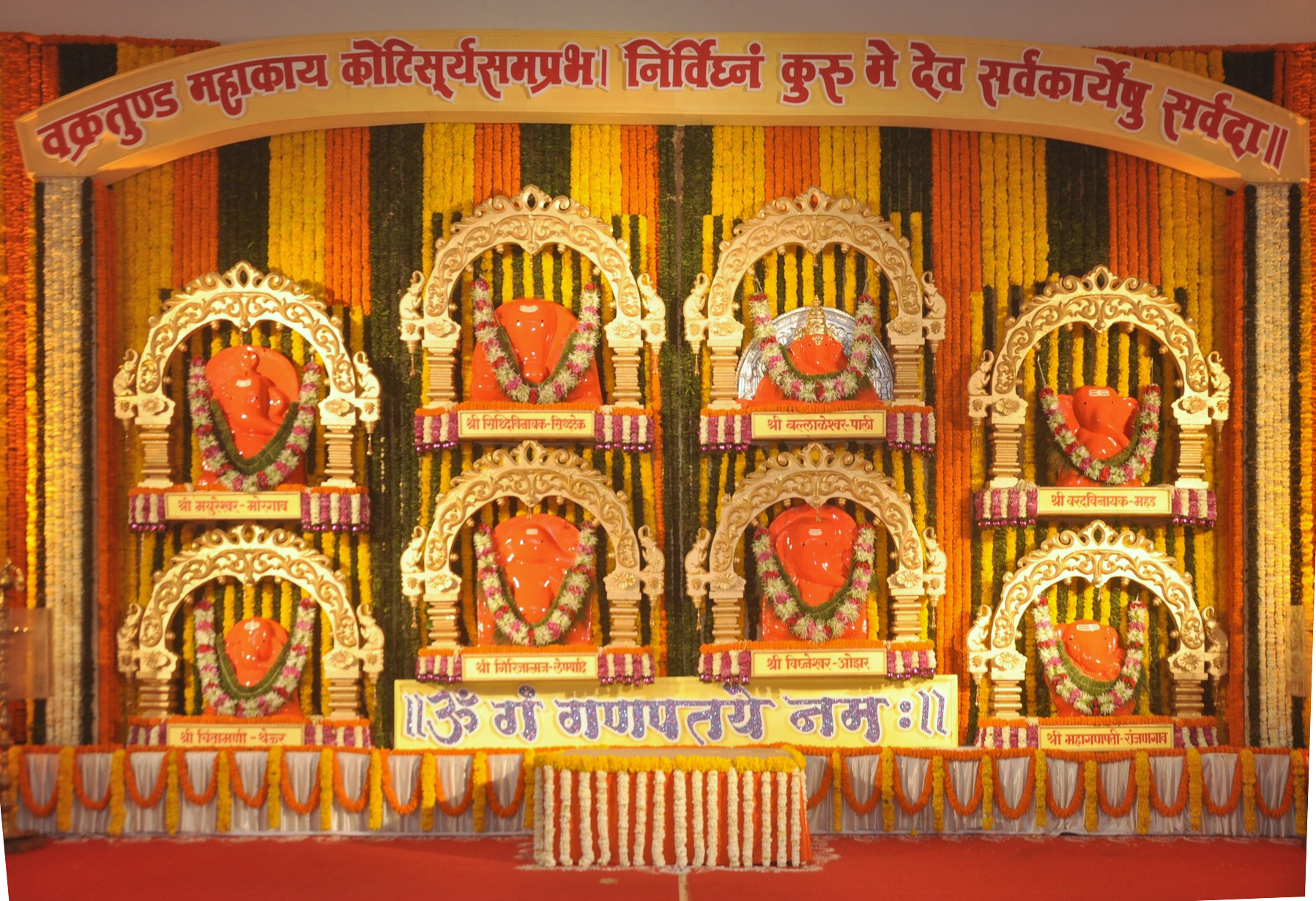
Maaghi Ganesh Utsav held by Shree Aniruddha Upasana Foundation, Mumbai

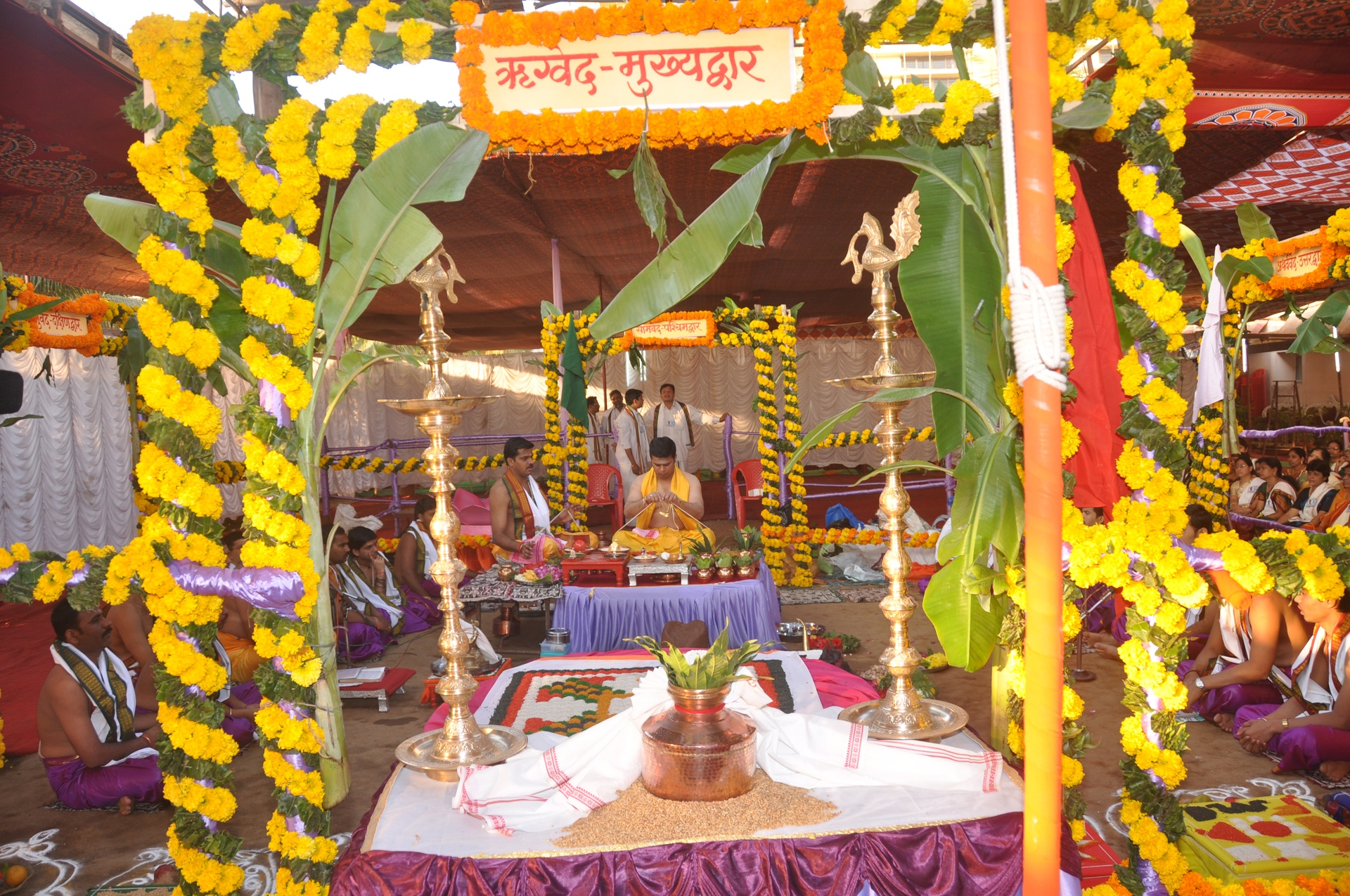
Maaghi Ganesh Utsav, Mumbai
