= Vigneshwara Temple, Ozar =

One of the Ashtavinayak temples of the Hindu deity Ganesha

Vigneshwara Temple
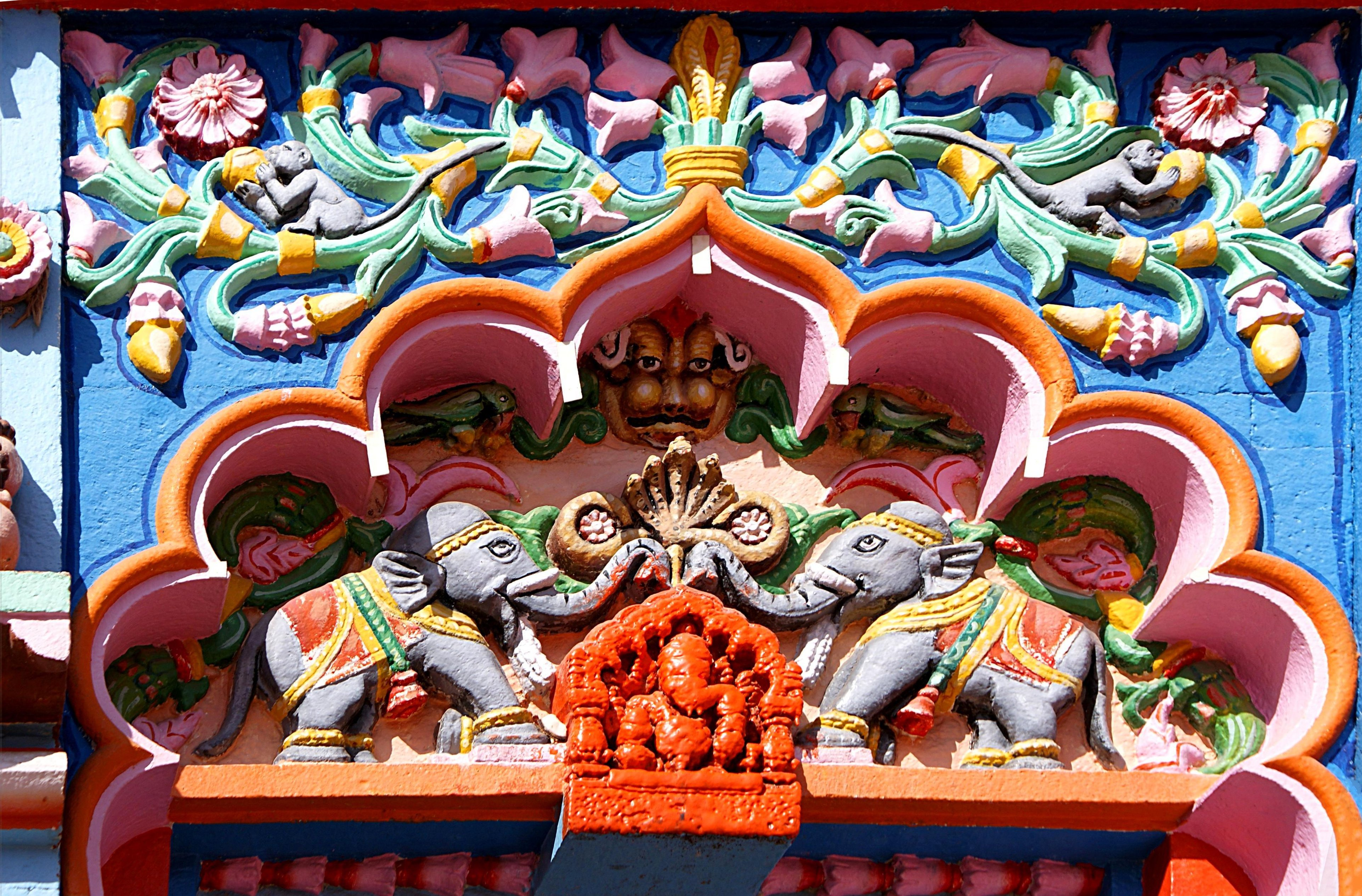
- The gate of the temple

- Location within Maharashtra

Religion
- Affiliation: Hinduism
- District: Pune District
- Deity: Ganesha as Vigneshwara/Vignahar
- Festivals: Ganesh Chaturthi, Ganesh Jayanti

Location
- Location: Ozar
- State: Maharashtra
- Country: India
- Interactive map of Vigneshwara Temple
- Coordinates: 19°11′17.07″N 73°57′34.70″E

Architecture
- Type: Mandir architecture

Website
- https://shrivighnaharganapatiozar.org/

The Vigneshwara Temple or Vighnahar Ganapati Temple of Ozar (also spelt as Ojhar or Ojzar) is a Hindu temple dedicated to Ganesha, the elephant-headed god of wisdom. The temple is one of the Ashtavinayaka, the eight revered shrines of Ganesha in Maharashtra, India. The Ganesha form worshipped here is called Vigneshwara (spelt also as Vigneshvar(a), Vigneshwar : "Lord of obstacles") or Vignahar (spelt also as Vignahara, "Remover of obstacles") and is associated with the legend of Ganesha defeating Vignasura, the demon of obstacles.

== Location ==
Ozar is located about 85 km from Pune, off the Pune-Nashik highway and about 9 km north to Narayangaon. Along another Ashtavinayak temple of Lenyadri, Ozar^{ⓘ} (also written as Ojhar or Ozhar) is a census town in Nashik District in the Indian state of Maharashtra. Ozar is situated on the banks of Kukadi River close to the Yedagaon dam built on it.

== History ==
Chimaji Appa, younger brother and military commander of the Peshwa Baji Rao I, renovated the temple and covered the shikhara (temple spire) with gold after seizing the Vasai Fort from the Portuguese. The temple was also renovated in 1967 by the Ganesha devotee Appa Shastri Joshi.

=== Religious significance ===
Though Ozar is prescribed to the seventh temple to be visited in the Ashtavinayak circuit, pilgrims often visit Ozar fifth, as it is a more convenient route.

The Mudgala Purana, Skanda Purana and the Tamil Vinayaka Purana record: King Abhinandana performed a sacrifice in which he did not give any offering to the god-king Indra. The infuriated Indra ordered Kala (Time/Death) to destroy the sacrifice. Kala takes the form of the demon Vignasura (obstacle-demon) or Vigna (obstacle), who created obstacles in the sacrifice and ruined it. Further, he created havoc in the universe, creating obstacles in the good deeds and sacrifices of sages and other beings. The sages asked god Brahma or Shiva for help, who advised the worship of Ganesha. Hearing the prayer of the ascetics, Ganesha began to battle the demon, who soon realized that it was impossible to win and surrendered to his opponent and agreed not to harass the beings of the world. It was arranged that Vigna (obstacles) would dwell only in places where Ganesha was not invoked or worshipped. In some versions, the remorseful Vigna was made an attendant of Ganesha, who would trouble those who fail to worship his Lord. Vignasura also requested Ganesha to take the name Vigneshwara (The Lord of Vigna/obstacles) to commemorate the event. The relieved sages consecrated an image of Ganesha as Vigneshwara at Ozar to mark the event.

== Architecture ==
The east-facing temple features a "spacious courtyard, a grand entrance, sculptural and mural work". It is surrounded by a walled compound with a large gateway flanked by two large stone Dvarapala (gatekeepers) sculptures and a row of four musicians in bas relief on the lintel. One can view the Lenyadri shrine and Shivneri Fort standing on the wall. Two large stone Deepamalas (lamp towers) stand near the gateway in front of a fine corridor of seven cusped arches. There are owaris (small room for meditation) on both sides of the gateway. The courtyard is tiled. The central temple has three entrances with sculptured side posts and lintels; the east one being the central one. The central one has a lintel with a Ganesha in relief surrounded with monkeys and parrots on trees. The temple has two halls, with first one (20 feet high) having the entrances to the north and south too and has the imagee of Dhundiraj Ganesha. The next one (10 feet high) has a white marble mushika (the mouse, which is the vehicle of Ganesha) seating in attendance. The temple walls is filled with murals and colourful sculptures. The shikhara - over the sanctum - is covered with gold foil. It also has two wide stone Prakarams (outer path outside a Hindu sanctum).

Like all Ashtavinayaka shrines, the central Ganesha image is believed to be svayambhu (self-existent), naturally occurring in the form of an elephant-faced stone. The central icon of Ganesha faces east and is flanked with brass images of his consorts Siddhi and Riddhi. He has a left-turning trunk and is covered with sindoor (vermillion). His eyes are emeralds and his forehead and navel is also adored with diamonds.

== Festivals ==
The temple celebrates the usual festivals associated with Ganesha: Ganesh Chaturthi and Ganesh Jayanti. In addition, a five-day festival starting on Kartik Poornima is also celebrated when the Deepamalas are lit.
