= Chintamani Temple, Theur =

Hindu temple in Maharashtra, India

Chintamani Temple
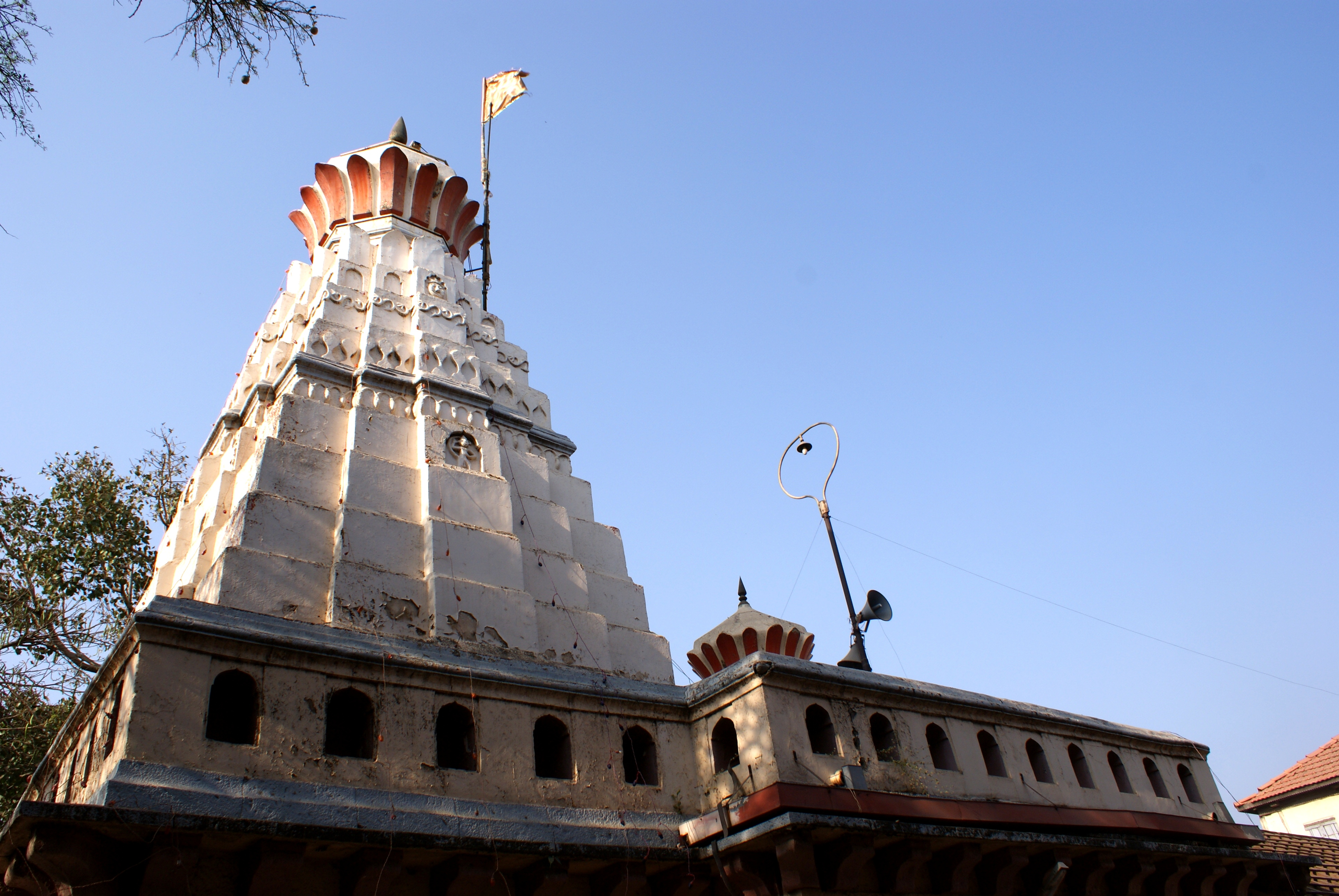
- The shikara of the temple

- Location within Maharashtra

Religion
- Affiliation: Hinduism
- District: Pune District
- Deity: Ganesha as Chintamani
- Festivals: Ganesh Chaturthi, Ganesh Jayanti

Location
- Location: Theur
- State: Maharashtra
- Country: India
- Interactive map of Chintamani Temple
- Coordinates: 18°31′25.67″N 74°2′46.62″E

Architecture
- Type: Mandir architecture

The Chintamani Temple of Theur is a Hindu temple dedicated to Supreme God Ganesha according to Ganapatya Sect located 25 km (16 mi) from Pune, the temple is "one of the larger and more famous" of the Ashtavinayaka, the eight revered shrines of Ganesha in the Indian state of Maharashtra.

The temple lore describes how bhagwan Ganesh retrieved the wish-giving jewel Chintamani for his devotee, the sage Kapila from the greedy king Gana and how he pacifies the uneasy mind of the god Brahma, who meditated on him in Theur. The temple is associated with the Ganapatya saint Morya Gosavi (dated between 13th to 17th century). Though the temple is believed to have existed since antiquity, the current structure of the temple was built by him or his descendant. The Chintamani Temple was also a spiritual magnet for the Peshwa rulers, especially Madhavrao I (1745–1772) who renovated and made additions to the temple structure.

== Location ==
Theur is located in the Haveli taluka of Pune district, near the confluence of river Bhima and the conjoint river Mula-Mutha.

== Religious significance ==
Though Theur is prescribed to the fifth temple to be visited in the Ashtavinayak circuit, pilgrims often visit Theur second in the circuit after Morgaon, as it is a more convenient route.

The Mudgala Purana narrates: Gana or Guna or Ganasura was the son of king Abhijit and his wife Gunavati. A strong, but greedy and hot-headed warrior king, Gana pleases the god Shiva – Ganesha's father with his worship. Shiva grants Gana the kingship of the three worlds – heaven, earth and underworld and decreed that Gana could not be killed by anything that possessed any of the three gunas. Once, Gana and his entire army arrives at the hermitage of the sage Kapila, who owned the wish-granting jewel Chintamani. Kapila serves the prince and his army with delicious food created with the help of the jewel. The greedy prince desires to acquire the jewel, however the sage refuses. However, Gana seizes it from the sage. Kapila, a devotee of Ganesha, prays to Ganesha to retrieve the gem. Ganesha with his army appears in Gana's dream; one of his soldiers cuts Gana's head. Gana wakes up and marches towards Kapila's hermitage with his army, intending to slay the sage. Abhijit tries to dissuade his son and advises him to return Chintamani to the sage, but in vain. Gana starts to destroy the hermitage. Ganesha's shakti ("power") – the goddess Siddhi appears and creates a thousand-armed warrior Laksha, who destroys Gana's army while Ganesha himself beheads the arrogant prince. Ganesha returns the jewel to Kapila, however, the sage chooses to have his Lord instead of the jewel itself. So, Ganesha stays on in Theur with Kapila, taking the name of the jewel Chintamani.

The name Theur originates from the Sanskrit word Sthavar meaning stable. According to another legend, the god Brahma meditated here and his restless mind became sthavar due to Ganesha's blessings. Since Ganesha got rid of Brahma's Chintas ("worries"), he became known as Chintamani. According to another tale, the god-king Indra worshipped Ganesha here under the Kadamba tree to get rid of the sage Gautama's curse. The place was thus known as Kadamaba-Nagar, the town of Kadamba trees.

== History ==
Though Theur is believed to a Ganapatya (sect which considers Ganesha as the Supreme Being) pilgrimage centre since ancient times, the current temple was built by the Ganapatya saint Morya Gosavi or his descendant Dharmadhar (Dharanidhar). The exact date of the temple is unknown.

Morya Gosavi often visited the temple on his trips between his home town Chinchwad and Morgaon, the foremost of the Ashtavinayaka temples. On every fourth lunar day after the full moon, Morya used to visit the Theur temple. According to a story, as per his guru's orders, Morya performed penance at Theur by observing a strict fast for 42 days, within this period, he is believed to have "divine revelations". Ganesha is believed to have appeared in the form of a tiger to Morya and granted him siddhi (spiritual powers).

The Theur temple along with other Ganapatya centres near Pune, enjoyed royal patronage from the Brahmin Peshwa rulers of the Maratha Empire during the 18th century. The Peshwas, who worshipped Ganesha as their kuladaivat ("family deity"), donated in land and/or cash and/or made additions to these Ganesha temples, especially Theur and Morgaon. The Theur temple has been a spiritual magnet of the Peshwas, especially Madhavrao I. Madhavrao, who also renovated the temple, used to visit before engaging in any battle and after a battle to thank for the success in battle. Madhavrao spent his last days in the precincts of the temple. In the period of extreme illness that led to his death, Madhavrao tried to please the Lord by performing Him a perennial abhisheka of milk. Chimaji Appa, brother and military commander of the Peshwa Baji Rao I, donated a large European bell, which still hangs in the temple. He had acquired it as war booty from the Portuguese after seizing the Vasai Fort.

Currently, the temple is under the administration of the Chinchwad Devasthan Trust, which also governs Morgaon and Siddhatek Ashtavinayak temples.

== Architecture ==
Described as "one of the larger and more famous" of the Ashtavinayaka temples, the temple's main gate located to the North is relatively smaller compared to the scale of the temple, however the central icon of Chintamani-Ganesha faces East. The temple has a wooden Sabha-mandapa (assembly hall), which was built by Madhavrao. The hall also has a black stone water fountain in it. Besides the central shrine dedicated to Ganesha, there are number of smaller shrines in the temple complex: Mahadeva (Shiva) temple, Vishnu-Lakshmi temple, Hanuman temple etc. Behind the temple is the Peshwa Wada – the Peshwa Palace. Once the residence of Madhavrao, today the day-to-day activities of the temple are carried from this place.

Like other Ashtavinyaka icons, the central icon of Ganesha is considered self-manifested and hardly any features are visible except the elephantine head – studded with jewel eyes – and trunk, which turns to his left. The icon is interpreted to be seated in cross-legged posture. The icon is smeared with sindur like rest of the Ashtavinyaka images.

== Temple festivals ==
The temple celebrates three main festivals. The Ganesha Prakatostav which corresponds to the Ganesh Chaturthi festival. The festival is celebrated from the first to the seventh day of the Hindu month of Bhadrapada, where Ganesh Chaturthi is the fourth day. A fair is held on this occasion. The Maghotsav festival is held to commemorate the birthday of Ganesha - Ganesha Jayanti, which falls on the fourth day of the Hindu month of Magha. The temple festival is celebrated from the first to the eighth of the month. A fair is also organized. The Rama-Madhav Punyostav on the eighth day of the Kartik month commemorates the death anniversary of the temple's best known patron, Madhavrao and his wife Ramabai, who performed Sati on his funeral pyre and was burnt with him.
