= Ganesha Temple, Morgaon =

Hindu temple dedicated to Ganesha in Morgaon, India

Shri Mayureshwar Mandir, Morgaon
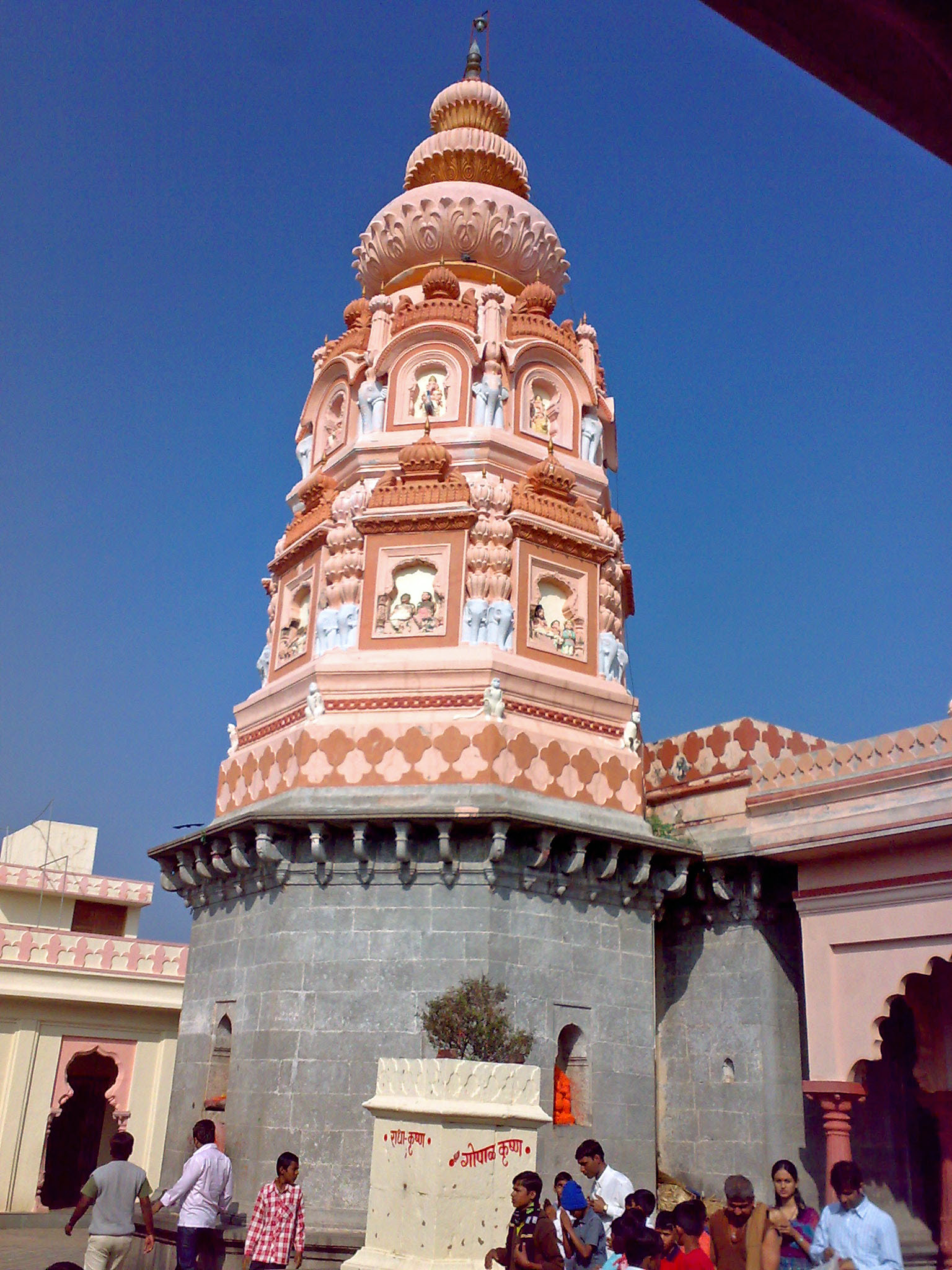
- The shikhara of the temple

- Location within Maharashtra

Religion
- Affiliation: Hinduism
- District: Pune District
- Deity: Ganesha as Mayureshwar or Moreshwar
- Festivals: Ganesh Chaturthi, Ganesh Jayanti, Vijayadashami

Location
- Location: Morgaon
- State: Maharashtra
- Country: India
- Interactive map of Shri Mayureshwar Mandir, Morgaon
- Coordinates: 18°16′33.8″N 74°19′17″E

Architecture
- Type: Mandir architecture
- Completed: 14th to 17th century AD

Shri Mayureshwar Mandir or Shri Moreshwar Temple is a Hindu temple (mandir) dedicated to Ganesha, god of wisdom. It is located in Moragaon in Pune District, about 65 km away from Pune city in the Indian state of Maharashtra. The temple is the starting and ending point of a pilgrimage of eight revered Ganesha temples called Ashtavinayaka.

Moragon is the foremost centre of worship of the Ganapatya sect, which considers Ganesha as the Supreme Being. A Hindu legend relates the temple to killing of the demon Sindhura by Ganesha. The exact date of building of the temple is unknown, though the Ganapatya saint Moraya Gosavi is known to be associated with it. The temple flourished due to the patronage of the Peshwa rulers and descendants of Moraya Gosavi.

== Religious significance ==
The Morgaon temple is the starting point of the pilgrimage of eight revered temples of Ganesha, around Pune. The temple circuit is known as Ashtavinayak ("Eight Ganeshas"). The pilgrimage is considered incomplete if the pilgrim does not visit the Morgaon temple at the end of the pilgrimage. The Morgaon temple is not only the most important temple in the Ashtavinayak circuit, but also is described as "India's foremost Gaṇeśa (Ganesha) pilgrimage" (IAST original).

Morgaon is the adhya pitha – foremost centre of worship of the Ganapatya sect, which considers Ganesha as the Supreme Being. It attracts the greatest number of pilgrims in the Ashtavinayak circuit. Both the primary scriptures of the Ganapatya sect praise Morgaon. While Mudgala Purana dedicates 22 chapters to Morgaon's greatness, Ganesha Purana states that Morgaon (Mayurapuri) is among the three most important places for Ganesha and the only one on earth (Bhuloka). The other locations are Kailash in heaven (actually Kailash is a mountain on earth in the Himalayas, believed to have the abode of Ganesha's parents Shiva and Parvati) and Adi-Shesha's palace in Patala (underworld). According to a tradition, the temple is without beginning and without an end. Another tradition maintains that at the time of pralaya (the dissolution of the world), Ganesha will enter yoganidra here. Its holiness is compared with Kashi, the sacred Hindu city.

=== Legends ===
According to the Ganesha Purana, Ganesha incarnated as Mayuresvara(Mayūreśvara), who has six arms and a white complexion. His mount is a peacock. He was born to Shiva and Paravati in the Treta Yuga, for the purpose of killing the demon Sindhu.

Sindhu was the son of Cakrapani – the king of Mithila and his wife Ugrā. Ugrā conceived due to the power of a solar mantra, but was unable to bear the extreme heat radiating from the foetus, so she abandoned it in the ocean. Soon, a son was born from this abandoned foetus and the ocean returned him to his grieving father, who named him Sindhu – the ocean.

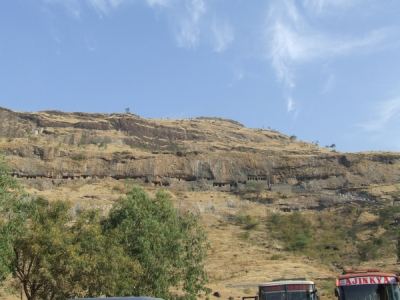
The caves of Lenyadri, where the Mayuresvara form of Ganesha is believed to have been born

Parvati underwent austerities meditating on Ganesha – "the supporter of the entire universe" – for twelve years at Lenyadri (another Ashtavinayak site, where Ganesha is worshiped as the son of Parvati). Pleased by her penance, Ganesha blessed her by the boon that he would be born as her son. In due course, Ganesha was born to Parvati at Lenyadri and named as Gunesha by Shiva. Little Gunesha once knocked an egg from a mango tree, from which emerged a peacock. Gunesha mounted the peacock and assumed the name Mayuresvara.

Sindhu was given the ever-full bowl of amrita (elixir of life) as a boon from the Sun-god. The demon was warned that he could drink from the bowl as long as it was intact. So to protect the bowl, he swallowed it. Sindhu terrorized the three worlds, so the gods asked Gunesha for help. Gunesha defeated Sindhu's army, cut his general Kamalasura into three pieces and then cut open Sindhu's body, emptying the amrita bowl and thus killing the demon. The creator-god Brahma is described as having built the Morgaon shrine, and marrying Siddhi and Buddhi to Ganesha. At the end of this incarnation, Gunesha returned to his celestial abode, giving his peacock mount to his elder brother Skanda, with whom the peacock mount is generally associated.

Because Ganesha rode a peacock (in Sanskrit, a mayura, in Marathi – mora), he is known as Mayureshwar or Moreshwar ("Lord of the peacock"). Another legend says that this place was populated by peacocks giving the village its Marathi name, Morgaon ("Village of peacocks"), and its presiding deity the name Moreshwar.

A Ganapatya legend recalls how the creator-god Brahma, the preserver-god Vishnu and the dissolver-god Shiva, the Divine Mother Devi and the Sun-god Surya mediated at Morgaon to learn about their creator and their purpose of existence. Ganesha emerged before them in form of an Omkara flame and blessed them. Another legend records that when Brahma created his son Kama (desire), he became a victim of desire and lusted for his own daughter Sarasvati (Goddess of learning). Upon invocation by all of the deities, the sacred Turiya Tirtha river appeared and Brahma bathed in her waters to cleanse his sin of incest. Brahma then came to Morgaon to worship Ganesha, carrying water from the river in his water pot. Entering the Ganesha shrine, Brahma stumbled and water fell from the pot. When Brahma tried to pick it up, it was turned into the sacred Karha river, that still flows at Morgaon.

== History ==
Morya Gosavi (Moroba), a prominent Ganapatya saint, worshipped at the Morgaon Ganesha temple before shifting to Chinchwad, where he established a new Ganesha temple. The Morgaon temple and other Ganapatya centres near Pune, enjoyed royal patronage from the Peshwa rulers of the Maratha Empire during the 18th century. The Peshwas, who worshipped Ganesha as their kuladaivat ("family deity"), donated in land and/or cash and/or made additions to these Ganesha temples.

According to Anne Feldhaus, the Morgaon temple does not pre-date the seventeenth century, when Morya Gosavi popularized it. However, even the dating of Morya Gosavi is disputed and varies from the 13th–14th century to the 17th century. The descendants of Morya Gosavi – who were worshipped as Ganesha incarnates at the Chinchwad temple – often visited the Morgaon temple and controlled the finances and administration of many Ashthavinayak temples. The 17th-century saint Samarth Ramdas composed the popular arati song Sukhakarta Dukhaharta, seeing the Morgaon icon.

Currently, the temple is under the administration of the Chinchwad Devasthan Trust, which operates from Chinchwad. Besides Morgaon, the temple trust controls the Chinchwad temple and the Theur and Siddhatek Ashtavinayak temples.

== Architecture ==
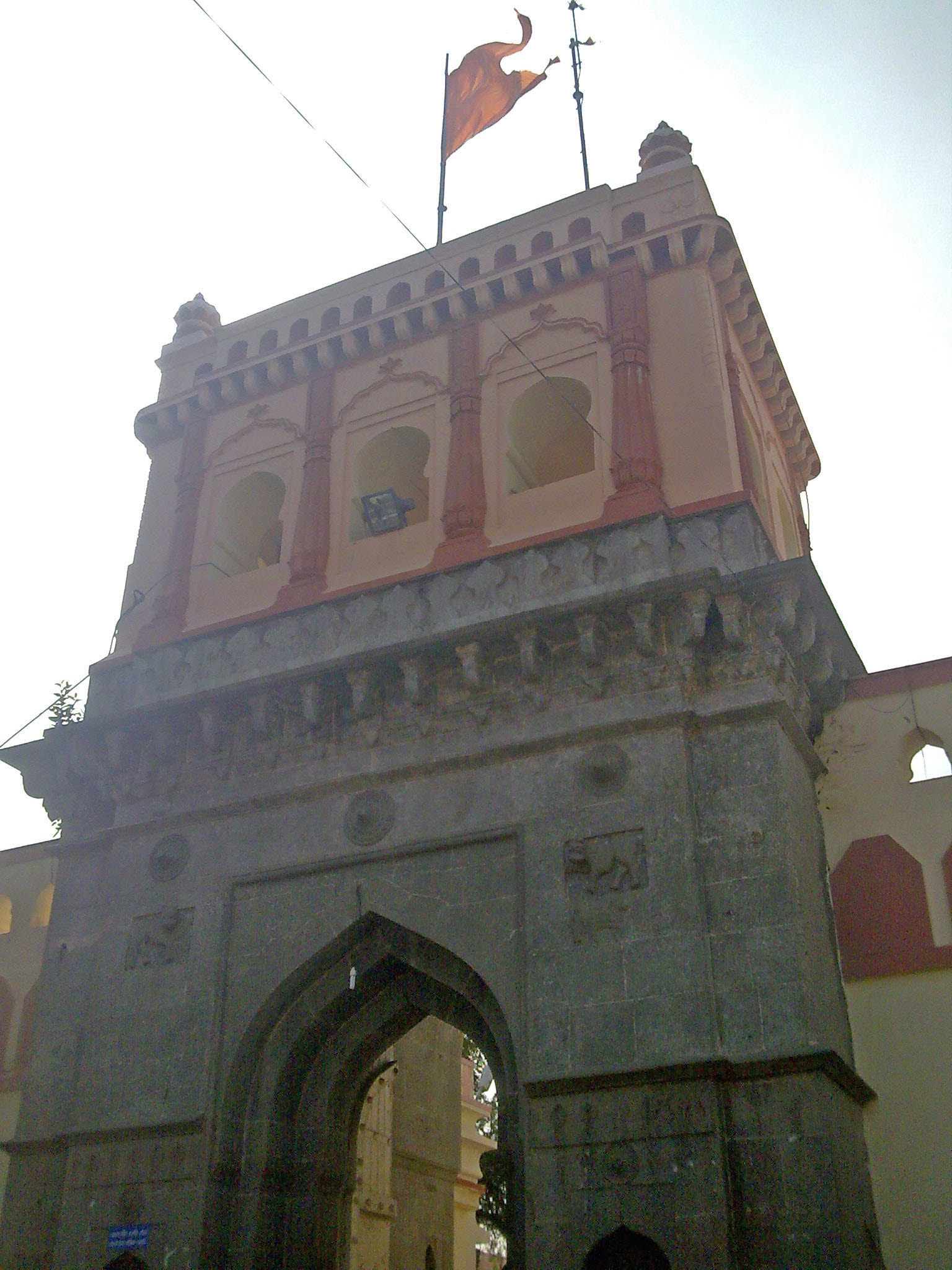
The main gate of the temple

The temple is surrounded by a tall stone boundary wall with minarets at each of the four corners, suggesting a Muslim influence on the architecture. The temple has four gates, each facing a cardinal direction and with an image of Ganesha, each gate depicting him in the form that he appeared in each of the four ages (yugas). Each of the four Ganesha forms is associated with a Puruṣārtha (aim of life) and accompanied by two attendants. The image of Ballalvinayaka at the eastern gate, accompanied by god Rama (Vishnu's Avatar) and his consort Sita, symbolises Dharma (righteousness, duty, ethnics) and embodies the preserver-god Vishnu. Vignesha at the southern gate, flanked by Ganesha's parents Shiva and Parvati symbolises Artha (wealth and fame) and embodies the dissolver – Shiva. Cintamani at the western gate – representing Kama (desire, love and sensual pleasure) – is attended by the love god Kamadeva and his wife Rati and embodies the formless (asat) Brahman. Mahaganapati at the northern gate standing for moksha (salvation), is accompanied by Varaha (Vishnu's boar avatar) and his wife the earth goddess Mahi embodies Sat Brahman.

The main entrance of the temple faces north. The quadrangular courtyard has two Deepmalas – lamp towers with niches to light lamps. A sculpted 6 foot mouse – the vahana (mount) of Ganesha sits in front of the temple. A Nagara-khana – which stores Nagaras (kettle drums) – is situated nearby. A huge Nandi bull sculpture is positioned facing the Lord, just outside the temple gates. This is considered unusual as a Nandi is normally positioned in front of the sanctum sanctorum in Shiva temples. A legend explains this oddity: the Nandi sculpture being transported from nearby Shiva temple, decided to settle in front of Ganesha and then refused to move. Both the mouse and Nandi are considered guardians of the entrance.

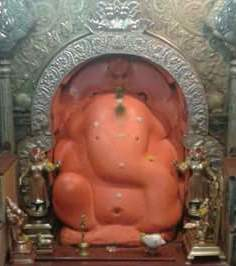
Central image at Morgaon.

A recently built sabha-mandapa (assembly-hall) has idols of god Vishnu and his consort Lakshmi. It leads to central hall built by the Patwardhan Rulers of Kurundwad. The ceiling of this hall is formed from a single stone. The garbhagriha (sanctum sanctorum) has a central image of Ganesha as Mayureshwar or Moreshwar, facing the North. The Ganesha image is depicted in a seated posture with its trunk turning to the left, four arms and three eyes. He holds a noose (pasha) and elephant goad (ankusha) in his upper hands, while his lower right rests on his knee and the other one holds a modaka (a sweet). The navel and the eyes are embedded with diamonds. A cobra hood raised over Ganesha's head, shelters the Lord. The image is actually smaller than it looks as it is smeared with a thick level of saffron-coloured Sindoor (vermillion), which peels off once every century. It last fell off in 1882, and prior to that in 1788. Ganesha is flanked by idols of his consorts Riddhi and Siddhi sometimes called Siddhi and Buddhi. These idols are made of an alloy of five metals or of brass. The deities are covered with crafted silver and gold. Like all Ashtavinayaka shrines, the central Ganesha image is believed to be svayambhu (self-existent), naturally occurring in the form of an elephant-faced stone. In front of the central image, the vahanas of Ganesha – the mouse and the peacock are placed. To the left outside the garbhagriha is an image of Nagna-Bhairava.

The space around the sabha-mandapa (assembly hall) has 23 different idols depicting various forms of Ganesha. The Ganesha idols include the images of the eight avatars of Ganesha described in Mudgala Purana – Vakratunda, Mahodara, Ekadanta, Vikata, Dhrumavarna, Vighnaraja and Lambodara – positioned in eight corners of the temple. Some of the images are installed by the Yogendra Ashram followers. One more noteworthy Ganesha idol is of "Sakshi Vinayaka" who is "a witness" to the prayers offered to Mayureshwara. Traditionally, first "Nagna Bhairava" is prayed then Mayureshwara and then Sakshi Vinayaka. This is the perfect sequence for prayers offered here.

There are other images of Hindu deities around the sabha-mandapa including those of the regional deities Vithoba and Khandoba, personifications of Shukla chaturthi and Krishna chaturthi (the 4th lunar day in bright fortnight and dark fortnight of a lunar month, both of which are sacred for Ganesha worship) and the Ganapatya saint Morya Gosavi. On the circumambulation path (Pradakshina path), there is a Tarati tree (a thorny shrub) near the Kalpavrushka Mandir. The tree is believed to be the spot where Morya Gosavi underwent penance. There are two sacred trees in the courtyard: shami and bilva.

== Worship and festivals ==
The central icon of Ganesha is worshipped daily: at 7 am, 12 noon and at 8 pm.

On Ganesh Jayanti (Magha Shukla Chaturthi) and Ganesh Chaturthi (Bhadrapada Shukla Chaturthi) festivals on the 4th lunar day in the bright fortnight of the Hindu months Magha and Bhadrapada respectively, devotees flock to the Mayureshwar temple in large numbers. On both occasion, a procession of pilgrims arrives from Mangalmurti temple, Chinchwad (established by Morya Gosavi) with the palkhi (palanquin) of Ganesha. The Ganesha chaturthi celebrations last for more than a month, until Ashvin Shukla (10th lunar day in the bright fortnight of the Hindu month Ashvin). Fairs and celebrations also occur on Vijayadashami, Shukla Chaturthi (the 4th lunar day in the bright fortnight of a Hindu month), Krishna Chaturthi (the 4th lunar day in the dark fortnight of a Hindu month) and Somavati Amavasya (a new moon night coinciding with a Monday).

== Works cited ==
- Grimes, John A. (1995). Ganapati: Song of the Self. SUNY Series in Religious Studies. Albany: State University of New York Press. pp. 38–9. ISBN 0-7914-2440-5.
