= Siddhatek =

Town in Maharashtra, India

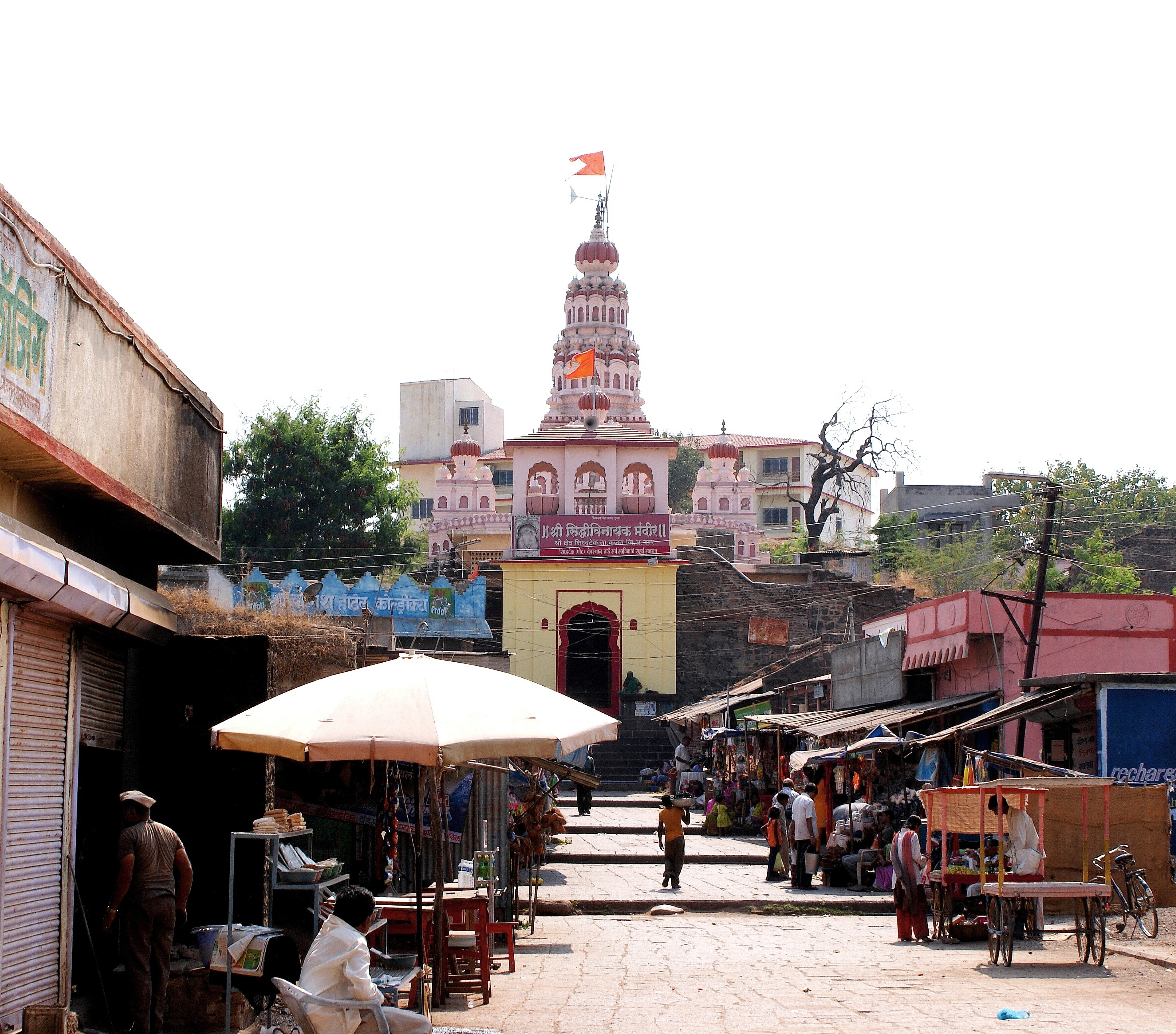
Siddhi Vinayak Temple in Siddhatek

Siddhatek is a town in the Ahmednagar district of Maharashtra, India on the Bhima River. The town has a Hindu temple to Siddhi Vināyaka, the right-tusked incarnation of Ganesha as "Masterful Remover". Legends say the north-facing temole was built to commemorate the place where Vishnu defeated the Asuras Madhu-Kaitabh with the blessing of Siddhi Vināyaka. The shrine is particularly popular during the festivals of Ganesh Jayanti, Vijayadashami and Somvati Amavasya.

== Sources ==
- Gunaji, Milind (2005). Offbeat Tracks in Maharashtra: A Travel Guide. Popular Prakashan. ISBN 81-7154-669-2.
