= Morya Gosavi =

Spiritual progenitor of the Ganapatyas

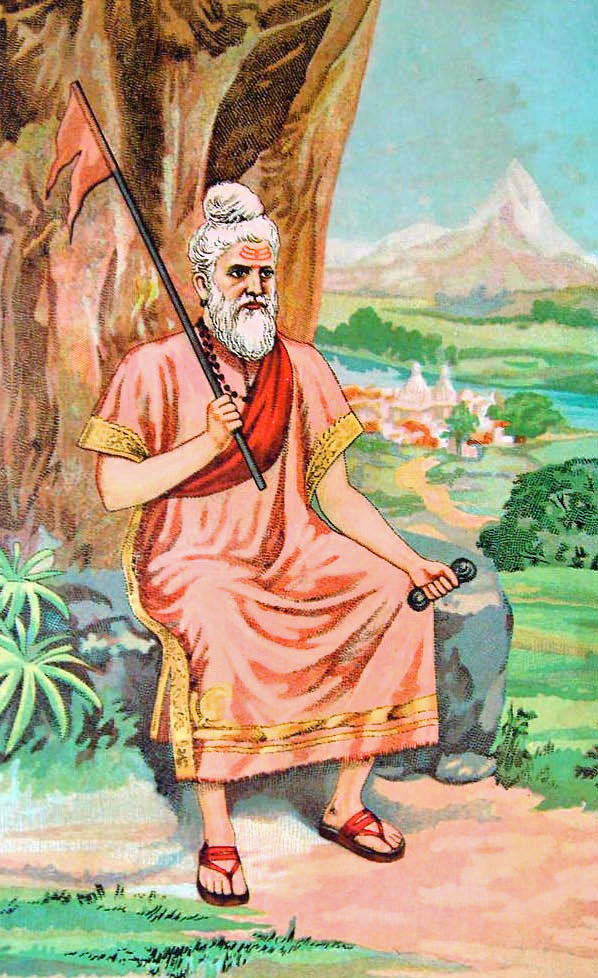
- Morya Gosavi lithograph

Personal life
- Born: AD 1375 Morgaon, Maharashtra, India
- Died: AD 1561 Chinchwad, Maharashtra
- Notable work: devotional poetry devoted Ganesha
- Honors: Venerated as the chief spiritual progenitor of the Ganapatyas

Religious life
- Religion: Hinduism
- Philosophy: Ganapatya

Morya Gosavi or Moraya Gosavi (Morayā Gosāvi) alias Moroba Gosavi was a saint of the Hindu Ganapatya sect, which considers Ganesha as the Supreme God. Morya Gosavi is considered the chief spiritual progenitor of the Ganapatyas and has been described as the "most famous devotee" of Ganesha.

The lifetime of Morya Gosavi is speculated between the 13th to 17th century. Numerous legends recall his life. Morya became devoted to Ganesha when he started visiting the Morgaon temple of Ganesha. It is believed that due to the hindrance in Morya's services to the god in the popular Ganesha shrine, Ganesha told Morya that he would appear in Chinchwad for Morya to worship, so Morya moved from Morgaon to Chinchwad, where Morya built a Ganesha temple. Consequently, Morya took sanjeevan samadhi by burying himself alive in his tomb.

Morya had a son called Chintamani, venerated as a living incarnation of Ganesha and addressed as Dev (god). Chintamani was succeeded by six more Devs. The tomb of Morya Gosavi and the Ganesha temple at Chinchwad still attract many Ganesha devotees.

== Dating ==
While Yuvraj Krishan places Morya Gosavi in the 13th–14th century, RC Dhere places him in the 16th century. Paul B. Courtright and Anne Feldhaus date him to 1610–59. The Pimpri-Chinchwad Municipal Corporation dates him to c. 1330 to 1556. His marriage year is given as 1470 and his son's birth corresponds to 1481. The Encyclopedia of Religion dates his death to 1651.

Various legends associate Morya Gosavi with Humayun (1508–1556), Shahaji (1594–1665) and his son Shivaji (1627–1680). His memorial temple has an inscription records that it was started in 1658-9.

== Early life ==
According to one version of the story, Morya was born in Bidar, Karnataka in a Deshastha Brahmin family. He was thrown out of the house by his father as he was thought to be of no use to the family. Morya travelled to the Ganesha shrine at Morgaon – in neighbouring Maharashtra – where he found a liking to Ganesha. He settled at Chinchwad, 50 miles (80 km) away from Morgaon. Another story declares him to be a son of a poor but pious couple Deshastha Brahmin from Pune, Maharashtra. Morya is believed to have been born due to the grace of Ganesha, whom the childless couple propitiated. After the birth of Morya, the family moved to Pimple, 40 miles (64 km) away from Chinchwad. After the death of his parents, Morya moved to Tathavade, 2 miles (3.2 km) away from Chichwad. Both legends declare he visited the Morgaon temple regularly, daily or monthly to worship Ganesha.

Another tale tells that Morya was born in a Deshastha Brahmin family with the surname Shaligram. Morya's parents, Bhat Shaligram and his wife moved to Morgaon from Bidar. His parents prayed to Ganesha at Morgaon. Soon, Morya was born to them. Later, Morya became seriously ill and was not recovering so they prayed to Ganesha again. Soon, a Gosavi (priest) named Nayan Bharati came and gave medicine to Morya, curing him. Nayan Bharati also preached to Morya. Henceforth, the Bhat family took the family name Gosavi and Morya was known as Morya Gosavi.

== From Morgaon to Chinchwad ==
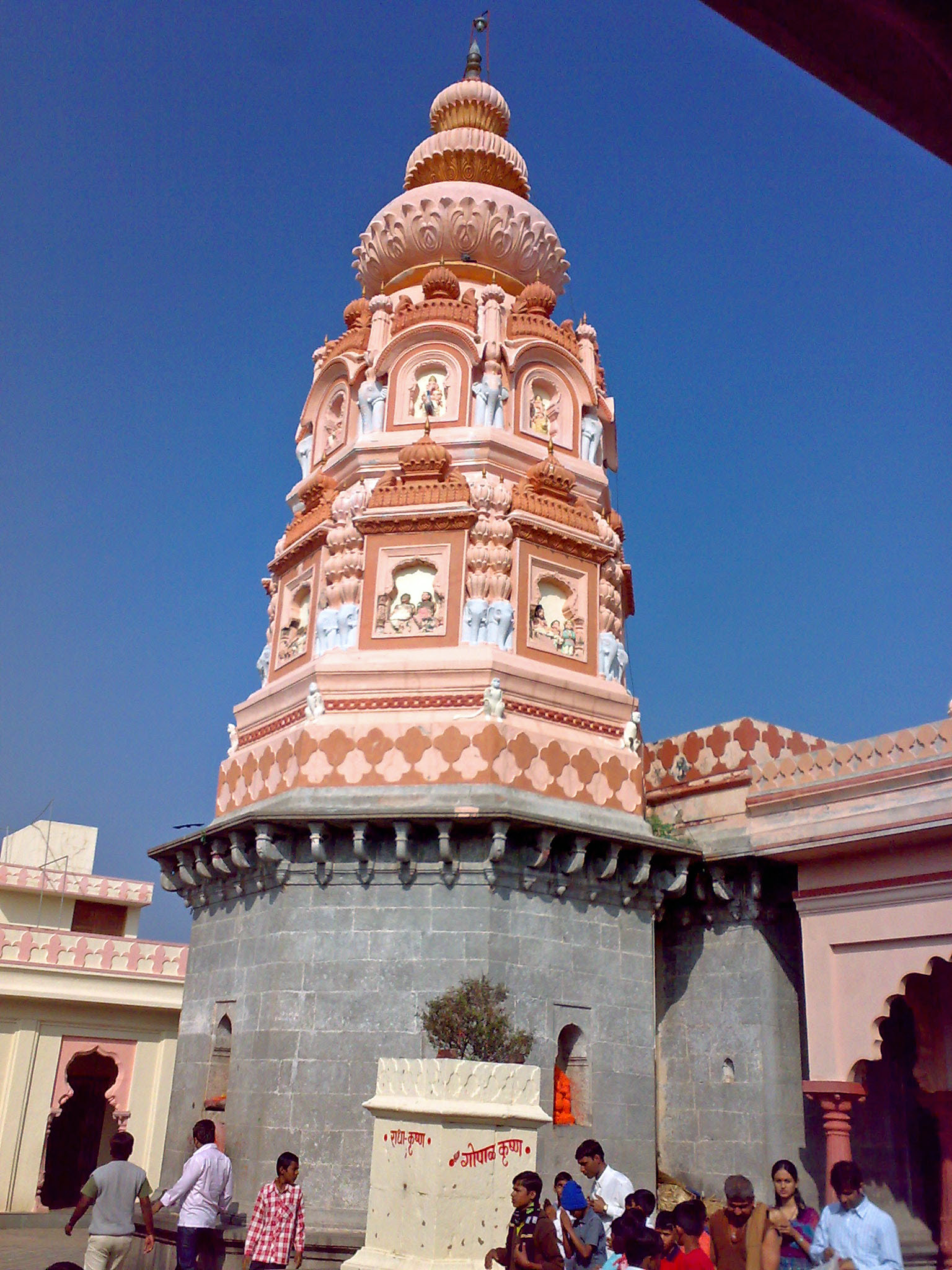
The Morgaon temple of Ganesha where Morya Gosavi worshipped Ganesha, before shifting to Chinchwad

According to a legend, on the occasion of Ganesh Chaturthi (August–September) – the largest festival dedicated to Ganesha – Morya could not find a place in the temple, crowded by the laity and the wealthy Pingle family. Morya left his offering under a tree and then by a "miracle", the laity's offerings from temple were exchanged with Morya's offerings under the tree. The laity accused Morya of sorcery and prohibited his entry in Morgaon. Ganesha appeared in a dream of Pingle and told Pingle that he was offended by the ill-treatment of his favourite devotee Morya. So Pingle requested Morya to come back to Morgaon, but Morya refused. Ganesha thus gave a vision to Morya saying that he would come to stay with Morya in Chinchwad. Accordingly, Morya found an image of Ganesha – similar to the one worshipped at Morgaon – while bathing in the river and built a small shrine for it.

Another tale tells that the head-man of Morgaon was impressed by Morya's pious ways and offered him milk every day he visited Morgaon. Once the head-man was not present at his house, so a blind girl went to offer the milk to Morya. The moment she touched the threshold of the house where Morya was waiting, her sight was restored. Morya became famous due to this miracle and is credited to have cured the eyes of Shivaji (1627–1680) too – who would become the founder of the Maratha Empire later. To escape the crowds of people, Morya relocated to the forest, where present-day Chinchwad stands. Due to his growing age, Morya found it hard to continue his visits to Morgaon. Once he reached Morgaon after the temple was closed. Tired and hungry, he slept. Ganesha gave Morya a dream-vision telling Morya to offer his prayers to him and that he would reside with Morya in Chinchwad and incarnate in Morya's lineage for seven generations. Morya woke to find the temple doors miraculously opened and offered his prayers. In morning when the temple-priests opened the temple-doors, they were astonished to see fresh flowers offered to the Lord and a pearl necklace missing. The necklace was discovered on Morya's neck, who was imprisoned but then freed due to Ganesha's aid. Morya found a conical stone rising in Chinchwad home, which he recognized as Ganesha and built a temple for it.

Another legend does not talk about his arrest, but says that Morya realised the presence of Ganesha at Morgaon but realised that there was hindrance in his devotion, so he moved to the forest near Tathavade to worship Ganesha. On every fourth lunar day after the full moon, Morya used to visit the Chintamani Temple of Theur. Once, devotees from Chinchwad requested Morya to visit the bank of Pavana River at Chinchwad. There, Chintamani – the form of Ganesha worshipped at Theur – is believed to have ordered Morya to marry. As per Ganesha's orders, Morya married Uma, the daughter of Govindrao Kulkarni whose family was staying in Tathavade near Chinchwad.

According to a story, as per his guru's orders, Morya performed penance at Theur by observing a strict fast for 42 days, within this period, he is believed to have "divine revelations". After the death of his parents, Morya moved from Morgaon to Chinchwad. The present structure of the Theur temple is built by Morya.

== Death and lineage ==
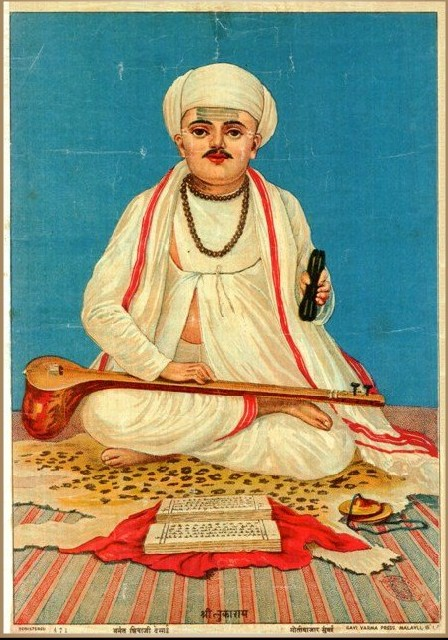
The saint-poet Tukaram (pictured) is said to have proclaimed Morya's son Chintaman as a Dev ("god"), earning his descendants the title "Dev".

Morya continued to visit Theur, Ranjangaon (another Ganesha temple site) and Chinchwad. Morya had a son, whom he named Chintamani (Chintaman). Chintamani was venerated as a living incarnation of Ganesha. But before that according to some experts, he helped the deposed Mughal emperor Humayun (1508–1556) to escape to Kabul, when Humayun again became the Emperor of Delhi, he showered Morya with gifts. According to Dhere, Chhatrapati Shivaji's father Shahaji (1594–1665) is recorded as a donor to Morya Gosavi.

After his wife's death and his guru Nayan Bharati's sanjeevan samadhi, Morya also took sanjeevan samadhi by burying himself alive in a tomb with a holy book in his hand. Morya left strict orders that his tomb be never opened. Chintamani built a temple (samadhi) over his father's tomb. Chintamani is described to have shown his true form as Ganesha to the Varkari saint-poet Tukaram (1577 – c.1650), who called Chintamani a Dev spelt also as Deva or Deo (god). The lineage was henceforth known as the Dev family.

Chintamani was followed as a Dev by Narayan, Chintamani II, Dharmadhar, Chintamani III, Narayan II and Dharmadhar II. The Mughal emperor Aurangzeb (1658–1707) gifted Narayan the hereditary grant of eight villages, impressed by the latter's "miracle" of changing a piece of beef sent by the former into jasmine flowers. (Beef is considered unholy in Hinduism and killing of cows – considered sacred – is prohibited.) Narayan II violated Morya's orders and opened the latter's tomb. According to the tale, Morya who was found still mediating in the tomb, was disturbed and cursed Narayan II that his son would be the last Dev. Narayan II's son, Dharmadhar II – the seventh generation of Morya – died childless in 1810 ending the direct lineage of Morya, but a distant relative of Dharmadhar, Sakhari was installed as a Dev by the priesthood to continue the temple funding. Devotional poetry of all the Devs still survive.

== Veneration ==
Morya Gosavi is considered the chief spiritual progenitor and the most important saint of the Ganapatya – the Hindu sect centred on Ganesha worship – tradition and has been described as the "most famous devotee" of Ganesha.

Chinchwad has shrines to the departed Devs, chief of which is that of Morya. Morya's memorial temple is a low plain building (30' x 20' x 40') with a square hall or mandap and an octagonal inner shrine, inscribed with a Marathi inscription: "This temple was begun on the bright twelfth of Kartik (November–December) Shaka 1580 (A.D. 1658-9) Vilambi Samvatsara and finished on Monday the bright fourth of Ashadha, Vikari Samvatsara". The temples enjoyed the revenue from the eight villages given by Aurangzeb in the past. The sanjeevan samadhi of Morya Gosavi as well as the Ganesha temple constructed by him still attracts many Ganesha devotees to Chinchwad. Devotees believe that though Morya Gosavi attained moksha (salvation) but "his presence continues to endow the shrine with sacred significance."

On the circumbulation path (Pradakshina path) of the Morgaon Ganesha temple, there is a tree near the Kalpavrushka Mandir. The tree is believed to have the spot where Morya Gosavi underwent penance. An image of Morya Gosavi is worshipped in the temple complex too. Morya Gosavi is also credited to have popularized the Morgaon temple.
