= Madhu-Kaitabha =

Asuras in Hindu mythology

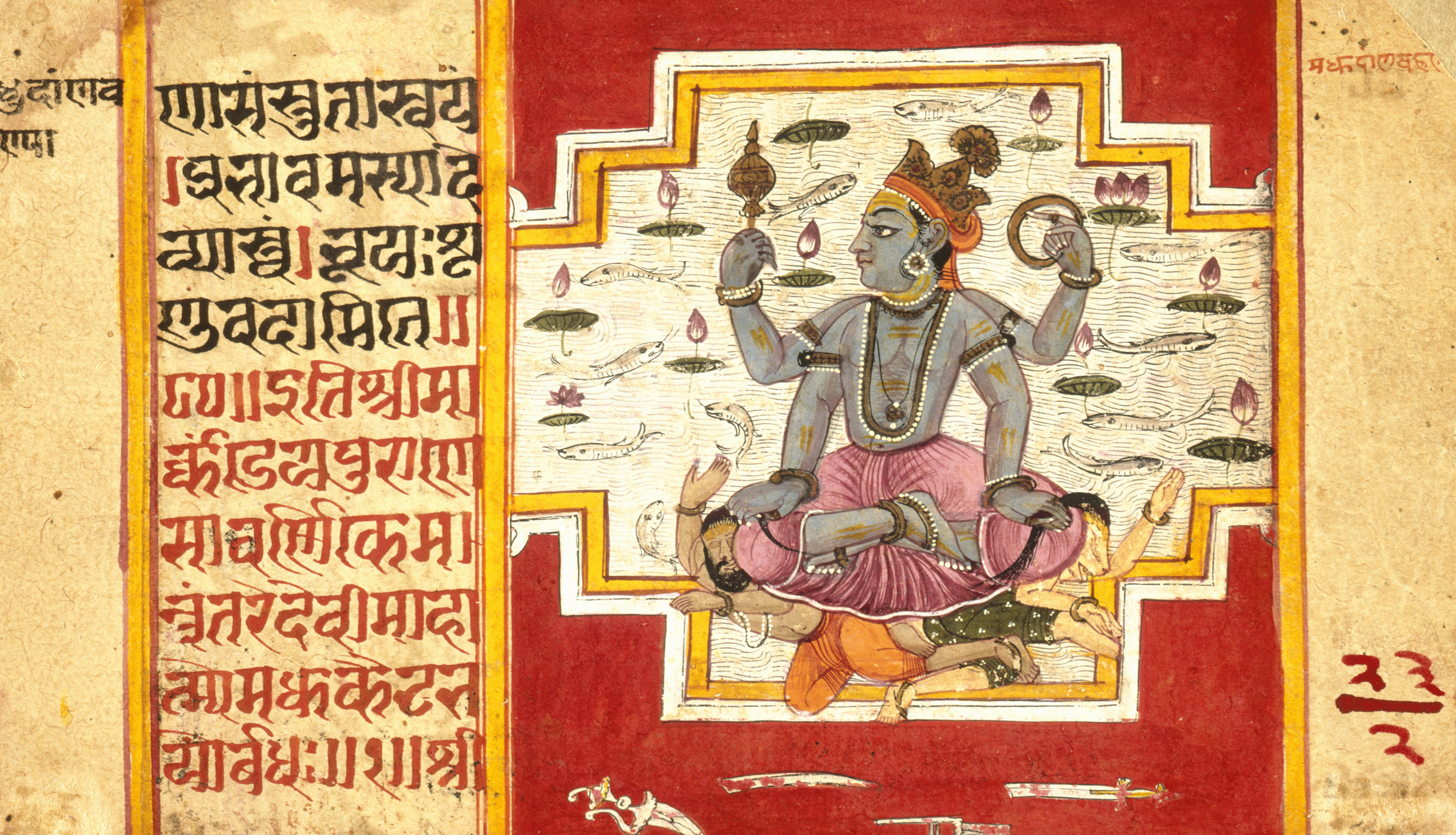
Folio of the death of Madhu and Kaitabha

Madhu (Sanskrit: मधु, IAST: Madhu) and Kaitabha (Sanskrit: कैटभ, IAST: Kaiṭabha), also rendered Madhu-Kaiṭabhas, are the names of two asuras in Hindu scriptures, and are associated with Hindu cosmology.

== Legend ==
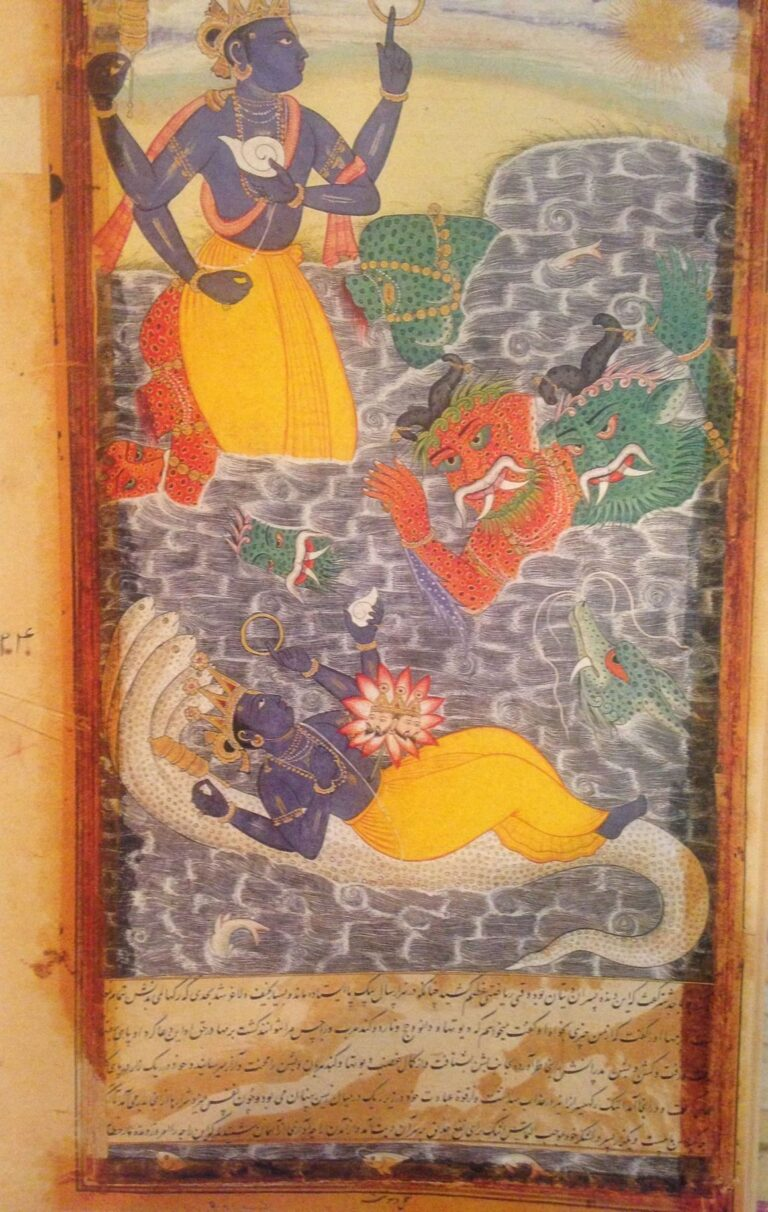
Vishnu killing the danavas Madhu and Kaitabha. From the Razmnama, the illustrated Persian translation of the Mahabharata in 1605

Madhu and Kaitabha both originated from the earwax within the deity Vishnu's ears, while he was in the meditative state of yoganidra. From his navel, a lotus sprouted, upon which Brahma, the creator, sat contemplating the creation of the cosmos. Two dewdrops of water upon the lotus were created by Vishnu. One drop was as sweet as honey, and from that drop emerged Madhu, imbued with the attribute of tamas (darkness). The other drop was hard, and from it was born Kaiṭabha, imbued with the attribute of rajas (activity).

According to the Devi Bhagavata Purana, Madhu and Kaitabha originated from Vishnu's earwax, and performed a long period of tapas devoted to the goddess Mahadevi, employing the Vāgbīja mantra. The goddess granted them the boon of death befalling them only with their consent. The proud asuras then started attacking Brahma, and stole the Vedas, hiding themselves in Patala. Brahma sought Vishnu's help, and eulogised the deity in order to awaken him. The two asuras then fought against Vishnu, and were undefeated. Upon advice from Mahadevi, Vishnu employed deceit to destroy the two asuras. Vishnu praised the powers of the two asuras, and said that he would be pleased to grant them boons. Laughing, the boastful asuras, proud of their victories against Vishnu, said that they were willing to grant him boons instead. Vishnu cleverly asked Madhu and Kaitabha for the boon of slaying them.

Defeated, the asuras requested Vishnu to be slain at any location except in the water, believing that they would still be invincible upon land. They were subsequently vanquished by Vishnu with his Sudarshana Chakra:

Mahāviṣṇu instantly raised his thighs which were enlarged to a great extent over the water as solid earth seeing which the Asuras enlarged their bodies to the extent of a thousand yojanas. But Mahāviṣṇu enlarged his thighs further, caught hold of Madhu and Kaiṭabha, laid them on his thighs and cut off their heads with his discus.

— Devi Bhagavata Purana, Book 1

The Bhagavata Purana states that during the creation, the asuras Madhu and Kaitabha stole the Vedas from Brahma, and deposited them deep inside the waters of the primeval ocean. Vishnu, in his manifestation as Hayagriva, killed them, and retrieved the Vedas. The bodies of Madhu and Kaitabha disintegrated into 2 times 6 — which is twelve pieces (two heads, two torsos, four arms and four legs). These are considered to represent the twelve seismic plates of the Earth.

According to another legend, Madhu and Kaitabha were two asuras who had become powerful enough to annihilate Brahma. However, Brahma spotted them, and begged the goddess Mahamaya for help. Vishnu then awoke, and the two conspiring asuras were killed. This led to Vishnu being offered the epithets Madhusudana - the killer of Madhu, and Kaitabhajit - the victor of Kaitabha.

The Mahabharata states that a child named Dhundhu was born to the asuras. Due to his desire to seek vengeance against Vishnu for killing his fathers, he was slain by King Kuvalāśva of the Ikshvaku dynasty and his sons.

== See also ==
- Dictionary of Hindu Lore and Legend (ISBN 0-500-51088-1) by Anna Dhallapiccola
