= Consorts of Ganesha =

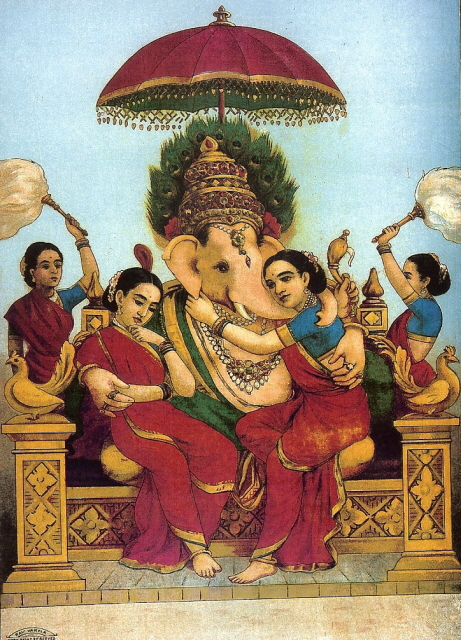
Ganesha with consorts Riddhi (prosperity) and Siddhi (spiritual power), Painting titled "Riddhi Siddhi" by Raja Ravi Varma (1848–1906)

The marital status of the Hindu deity Ganesha varies widely in mythological stories and the issue has been the subject of considerable scholarly review. Several patterns of associations with different consorts are identifiable. One pattern of myths identifies Ganesha as an unmarried brahmacārin with no consorts. Another mainstream pattern associates him with the concepts of Buddhi (intellect), Siddhi (spiritual power), and Riddhi (prosperity); these qualities are sometimes personified as goddesses who are considered to be Ganesha's wives. Another pattern connects Ganesha with the goddess of culture and the arts, Sarasvati. In the Bengal region he is linked with the banana tree, Kala Bo (or Kola Bou). Usually Ganesha's consort is portrayed as his shakti, a personification of his creative energy.

Some of the differences between these patterns can be understood by looking at regional variations across India, the time periods in which the patterns are found, and the traditions in which the beliefs are held. Some differences pertain to the preferred meditation form used by the devotee, with many different traditional forms ranging from Ganesha as a young boy (Sanskrit: बाल गणपति; bālagāņapati) to Ganesha as a Tantric deity.

== Unmarried ==
According to one non-mainstream tradition, Ganesha was a brahmacārin, that is, unmarried. This pattern is primarily popular in parts of southern India. This tradition was linked to the controversial concept of the relationship between celibacy and the commitment to spiritual growth. Bhaskaraya alludes to the tradition in which Ganesha was considered to be a lifelong bachelor in his commentary on the Ganesha Purana version of the Ganesha Sahasranama, which includes the name Abhīru (verse 9a). In his commentary on this verse Bhaskaraya says the name Abhīru means "without a woman," but the term can also mean "not fearful."

== Buddhi, Siddhi, and Riddhi ==
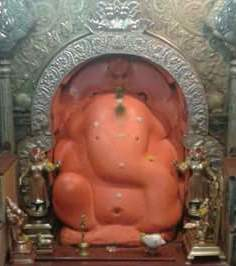
Central image of Ganesha with Siddhi and Buddhi on his side, Morgaon temple.

The Ganesha Purana and the Mudgala Purana contain descriptions of Ganesha flanked by Siddhi and Buddhi. In these two Puranas they appear as an intrinsic part of Ganapati and according to Thapan do not require any special rituals associated with shakti worship. In Chapter I.18.24–39 of the Ganesha Purana, Brahmā performs worship in honor of Ganesha, and during it Ganesha himself causes Buddhi and Siddhi to appear so that Brahmā can offer them back to Ganesha. Ganesha accepts them as offerings. In Ganesha Purana I.65.10–12 there is a variant of this incident, in which various gods are giving presents to Ganesha, but in this case Siddhi and Buddhi are born from Brahmā's mind and are given by Brahmā to Ganesha.

The Ganesha Temple at Morgaon is the central shrine for the regional aṣṭavināyaka complex. The most sacred area within the Moragaon temple is the sanctum (garbhagŗha), a small enclosure containing an image of Ganesha. To the right and left sides of the image stand Siddhi and Buddhi. In northern India the two female figures are said to be Siddhi and Riddhi. There is no Purāṇic evidence for the pair, but the pairing parallels those of Buddhi and Siddhi in Shiva Purana and Riddhi and Buddhi from Matsya Purana.

=== Interpretation of relationships ===
The Śiva Purāṇa has a story in which Ganesha and his brother Skanda compete for the right to marry the two desirable daughters of Prajāpati, Siddhi and Buddhi, and, Ganesha wins through a clever approach. This story adds that after some time Ganesha begat two sons: Kshema (Kşema) (Prosperity), born to Siddhi, and Lābha (Acquisition, Profit) born to Buddhi. In Northern Indian variants of this story, the sons are often said to be Śubha (Hindi Shubh) (auspiciousness) and Lābha. In discussing the Shiva Purana version, Courtright comments that while Ganesha is sometimes depicted as sitting between these two feminine deities, "these women are more like feminine emanations of his androgynous nature, Shaktis rather than spouses having their own characters and spouses."

Ludo Rocher says that "descriptions of Gaṇeśa as siddhi-buddhi-samanvita 'accompanied by, followed by siddhi and buddhi.' often seem to mean no more than that, when Gaṇeśa is present, siddhi 'success' and buddhi 'wisdom' are not far behind. Such may well have been the original conception, of which the marriage was a later development." In verse 49a of the Ganesha Purana version of the Ganesha Sahasranama, one of Ganesha's names is Ŗddhisiddhipravardhana ("Enhancer of material and spiritual success"). The Matsya Purana identifies Gaṇesha as the "Owner of the Qualities of Riddhi (prosperity) and Buddhi (wisdom)".

In the Ajitāgama, a Tantric form of Ganesha called Haridra Ganapati is described as turmeric-colored and flanked by two unnamed wives. The word "wives" (Sanskrit: दारा; dārā) is specifically used (Sanskrit: दारायुगलम्; dārāyugalam). These wives are distinct from shaktis.

=== Ashta Siddhi ===
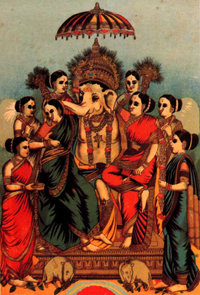
Ganesha with the Ashta (8) Siddhi. The Ashtasiddhi are associated with Ganesha. – painting by Raja Ravi Varma (1848–1906)

Ganesha's relationship with the Ashtasiddhi — the eight spiritual attaintments obtained by the practice of yoga — is also of this depersonalized type. In later iconography, these eight marvellous powers are represented by a group of young women who surround Ganesha. Raja Ravi Varma's painting (shown in this section) illustrates a recent example of this iconographic form. The painting includes fans, which establish the feminine figures as attendants. In cosmopolitan Śākta worship of Ganesha, the Aṣṭa Siddhi are addressed as eight goddesses. In Ganesha Purana, these personified Aṣṭa Siddhi are used by Ganesha to attack demon Devantaka. These eight consorts are fused in a single devi, Ganesha's śakti, according to Getty. She speculates as to whether the Aṣṭa Siddhi are a transformation of the saptamātṝikas with whom Ganesha is often sculpturally represented.

=== Devi Santoshi ===
Ganesha was depicted as a householder married to Riddhi and Siddhi and the father of Santoshi Ma (Devanagari: संतोषी माँ), the goddess of contentment, in the 1975 Hindi film Jai Santoshi Maa. The movie script is not based on scriptural sources. The fact that a cult has developed around the figure of Santoshi Ma has been cited by Anita Raina Thapan and Lawrence Cohen as evidence of Ganesha's continuing evolution as a popular deity.

== Buddhi (Wisdom) ==
Ganesha is considered to be the Lord of Intelligence. In Sanskrit the word buddhi is a feminine noun that is variously translated as intelligence, wisdom, or intellect. The concept of buddhi is closely associated with the personality of Ganesha as of the Puranic period, where many stories develop that showcase his cleverness and love of intelligence. One of Ganesha's names in the Ganesha Purana and in the Ganesha Sahasranama is Buddhipriya. The name Buddhipriya also appears in a special list of twenty-one names that Gaṇeśa says are of special importance at the end of the Ganesha Sahasranama. The word priya can mean "fond of" or in a marital context it can mean "a lover, husband", so Buddhipriya means "fond of intelligence" or "Buddhi's husband".

This association with wisdom also appears in the name Buddha, which appears as a name of Ganesha in the second verse of the Ganesha Purana version of the Ganesha Sahasranama. The positioning of this name at the beginning of the Ganesha Sahasranama indicates that the name was of importance. Bhaskararaya's commentary on the Ganesha Sahasranama says that this name for Ganesha means that the Buddha was an avatar of Ganesha. This interpretation is not widely known even among Ganapatya, and the Buddha is not mentioned in the lists of Ganesha's incarnations given in the main sections of the Ganesha Purana and Mudgala Purana. Bhaskararaya also provides a more general interpretation of this name as simply meaning that Ganesha's very form is "eternal enlightenment" (nityabuddaḥ), so he is named Buddha.

== Motif of shaktis ==
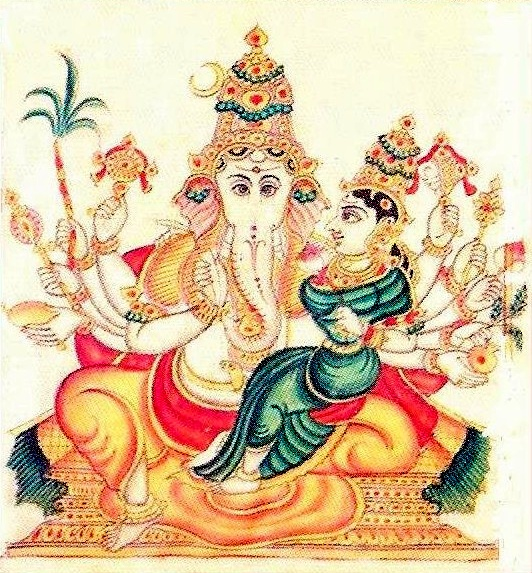
Ganesha in his form as Mahaganapati with a shakti. From the Sritattvanidhi (19th century).

A distinct type of iconographic image of Ganesha shows him with a single human-looking shakti (Sanskrit: śakti). According to Ananda Coomaraswamy, the oldest known depiction of Ganesha with a shakti dates from the sixth century. The consort lacks a distinctive personality or iconographic repertoire. According to Cohen and Getty, the appearance of this shakti motif parallels the emergence of tantric branches of the Ganapatya cult. Getty mentions a specific cult of "Shakti Ganapati" that was set up by the Ganapatyas involving five distinct forms. Of the thirty-two standard meditation forms for Ganesha that appear in the Sritattvanidhi (Śrītattvanidhi), six include a shakti. A common form of this motif shows Ganesha seated with the shakti upon his left hip, holding a bowl of flat cakes or round sweets. Ganesha turns his trunk to his own left in order to touch the tasty food. In some of the tantric forms of this image, the gesture is modified to take on erotic overtones. Some tantric variants of this form are described in the Śāradātilaka Tantram.

Prithvi Kumar Agrawala has traced at least six different lists of fifty or more aspects or forms of Ganesha each with their specific female consorts or shaktis. In these lists of paired shaktis are found such goddess names as Hrī, Śrī, Puṣṭī, etc. The names Buddhi, Siddhi, and Riddhi do not appear on any of these lists. The lists provide no details about the personalities or distinguishing iconographic forms for these shaktis. Agrawala concludes that all of the lists were derived from one original set of names. The earliest of the lists appears in the Nārada Purāṇa (I.66.124-38), and appears to have been used with minor variations in the Ucchiṣṭagaṇapati Upāsanā. These lists are of two types. In the first type the names of various forms of Ganesha are given with a clear-cut pairing of a named shakti for that form. The second type, as found in the Brahmāṇḍa Purāṇa (II.IV.44.63–76) and the commentary of Rāghavabhaṭṭa on the Śāradātilaka (I.115), gives fifty or more names of Ganesha collectively in one group, with the names of the shaktis provided collectively in a second group. The second type of list poses problems in separating and properly connecting the names into pairs due to ambiguities in the formation of Sanskrit compound words.

== Association with Sarasvati and Lakshmi ==
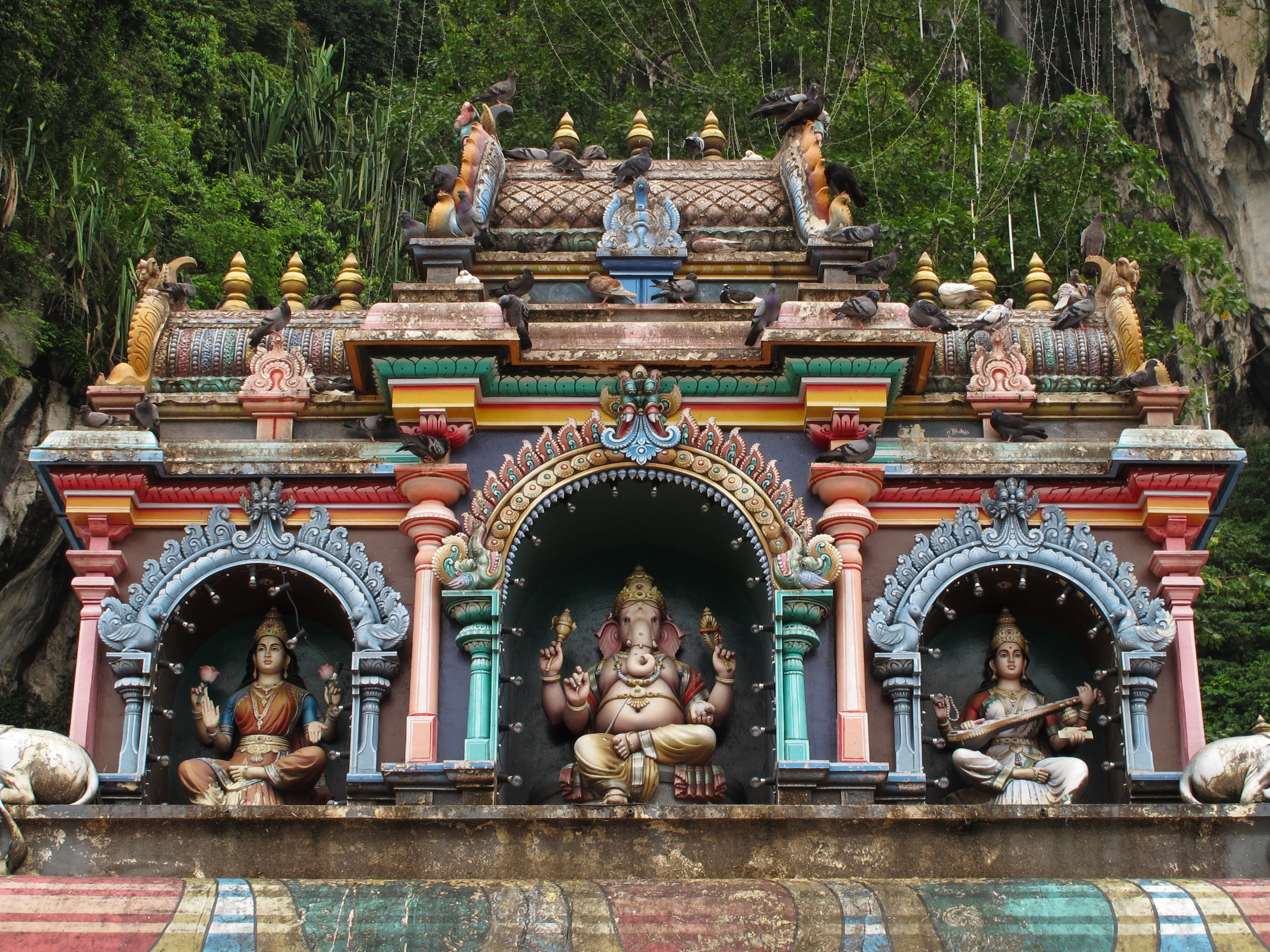
Ganesha (centre), Lakshmi (left) and Sarasvati on a temple.

Throughout India, on contemporary poster art, Ganesha is portrayed with Sarasvati (goddess of knowledge, music, speech and art) or Lakshmi (goddess of wealth, art and prosperity) or both. Ganesha, Lakshmi and Sarswati are often grouped together as the divinities immediately responsible for material welfare. Ganesha and Saraswati share control over Buddhi (Wisdom), while Ganesha and Lakshmi are both deities of Riddhi and Siddhi (material and spiritual success). Particularly in Maharashtra, Ganesha is associated with Śarda or Sarasvati. Some identify the two goddesses as the same person and thus venerated individually with Ganesha, while others consider them distinct, and one or both of them as associated with Ganesha. Lakshmi's association with Ganesha is rarely tied with the Tantric tradition of Lakshmi as Ganesha's śakti. Other reasons are variously offered for their relationship: their functional equivance and their joint worship on Diwali and in general by the "business community." Conversely, in Calcutta, Ganesha is said to be the brother of Sarasvati and Lakshmi.

== Kola Bou ==
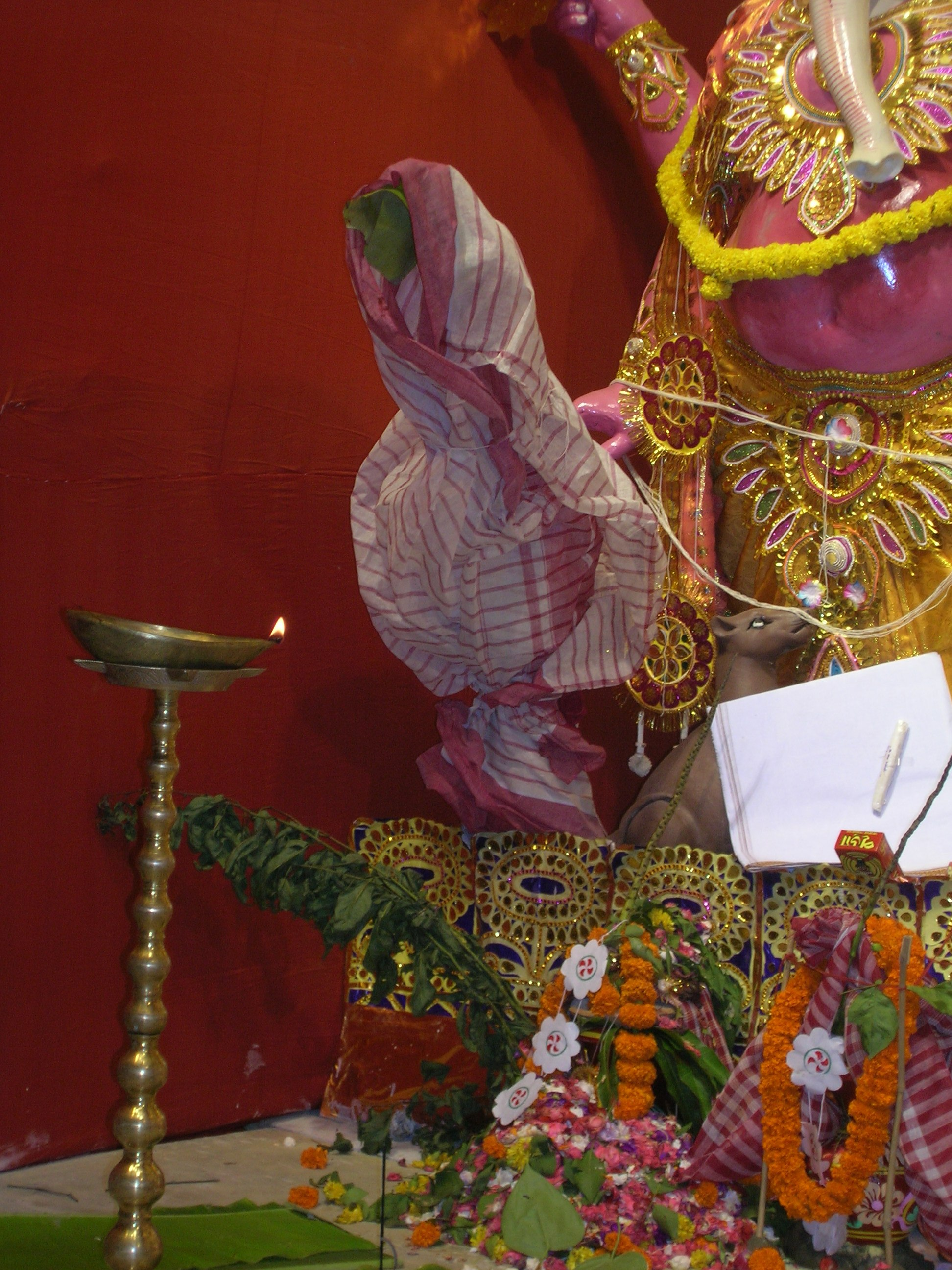
Kola Bou (Banana wife) dressed in a white-red sari placed near the Ganesha image in a Durga Puja

In Bengal, Ganesha on Durga Puja is associated with a plantain (banana) tree, the "Kola Bou" (also spelled Kola-Bou), ritually transformed into a goddess during the festival.

On the first day of Durga Puja the Kola Bou is draped with a red-bordered white sari and vermilion is smeared on its leaves. She is then placed on a decorated pedestal and worshipped with flowers, sandalwood paste, and incense sticks. The Kola Bou is set on Ganesha's right side, along with other deities. For most who view her, the new sari indicates her role as a new bride, and many Bengalis see it as symbolizing the wife of Ganesha. A different view is that the Kola Bou represents Haridas. Mitra says that the Kola Bou is intended to serve as a symbolic summary for the nine types of leaves (nava patrika) that together form a sacred complex on Durga Puja. The officiating priests who carry out the ceremony tie a bunch of eight plants on the trunk of the plantain tree and it is the grouping of all nine plants that constitute the Kola Bou. The nine plants all have beneficial medicinal properties. According to Martin-Dubost, the Kola Bou does not represent a bride or shakti of Ganesha, but rather is the plant form of Durga. He connects the plant symbol back to the festival enactment of Durga's return of the blood of the buffalo demon to the earth so that the order of the world may be re-established and luxuriant vegetation reappear. He links Ganesha to this vegetation myth and notes that Astadasausadhisristi (Aṣṭādaśauṣadhisṛṣṭi, "Creator of the eighteen medicinal plants") is a name of Ganesha.
