= Heramba =

Aspect of the Hindu god Ganesha

Heramba Ganapati
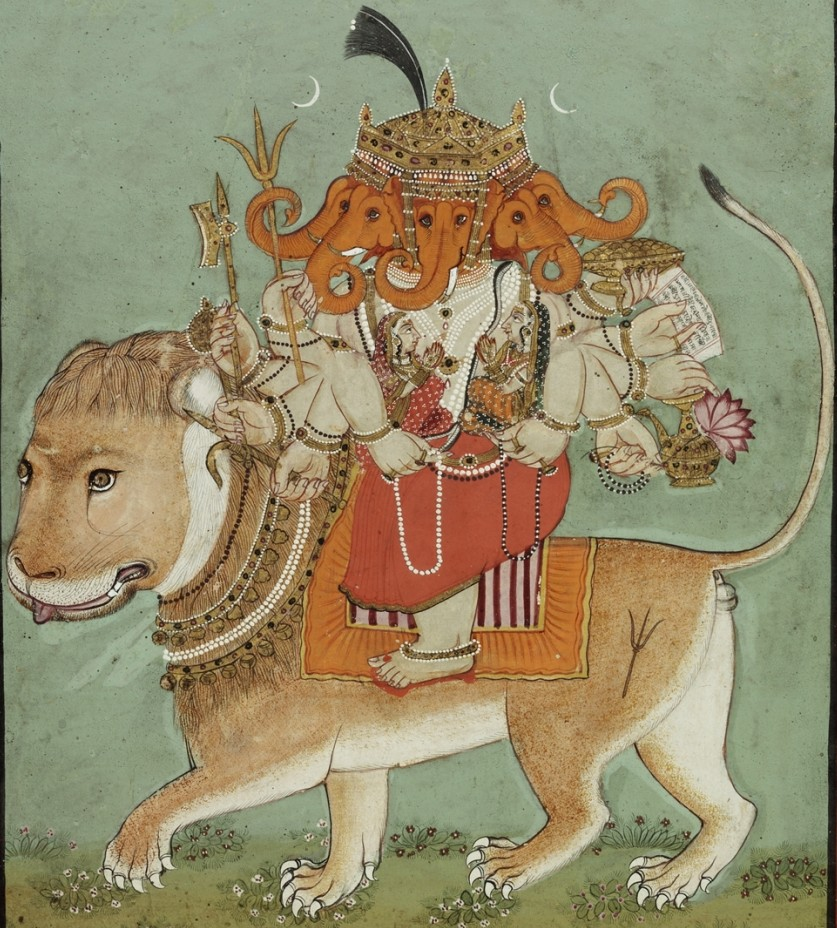
- An early 18th century Mewar painting of Heramba.
- Devanagari: हेरम्ब गणपति

Heramba (Sanskrit: हेरम्ब, Heraṃba), also known as Heramba Ganapati (Heraṃba-gaṇapati), is a five-headed iconographical form of the Hindu god Ganesha (Ganapati). This form is particularly popular in Nepal. This form is important in Tantric worship of Ganesha. He is one of the most popular of the thirty-two forms of Ganesha.

== As an epithet ==
The Mudgala Purana mentions Heramba Ganapati as one of the thirty-two names of Ganesha. The Skanda Purana lists that Heramba Vinayaka as one of the 56 Vinayakas in the vicinity of Varanasi. Heramba also figures in the lists of Ganesha's names in the Brahma Vaivarta Purana (8 names), the Padma Purana (12 epithets) and the Cintyagama (16 Ganapatis). Heramba is also used as an epithet of Ganesha in the Ganesha Purana.

The Brahma vaivarta Purana explains the meaning of Heramba: the syllable he denotes helplessness or weakness, while ramba is protection of the weak, to save them from harm; thus Heramba means the "Protector of the weak and good people".

== Iconography ==
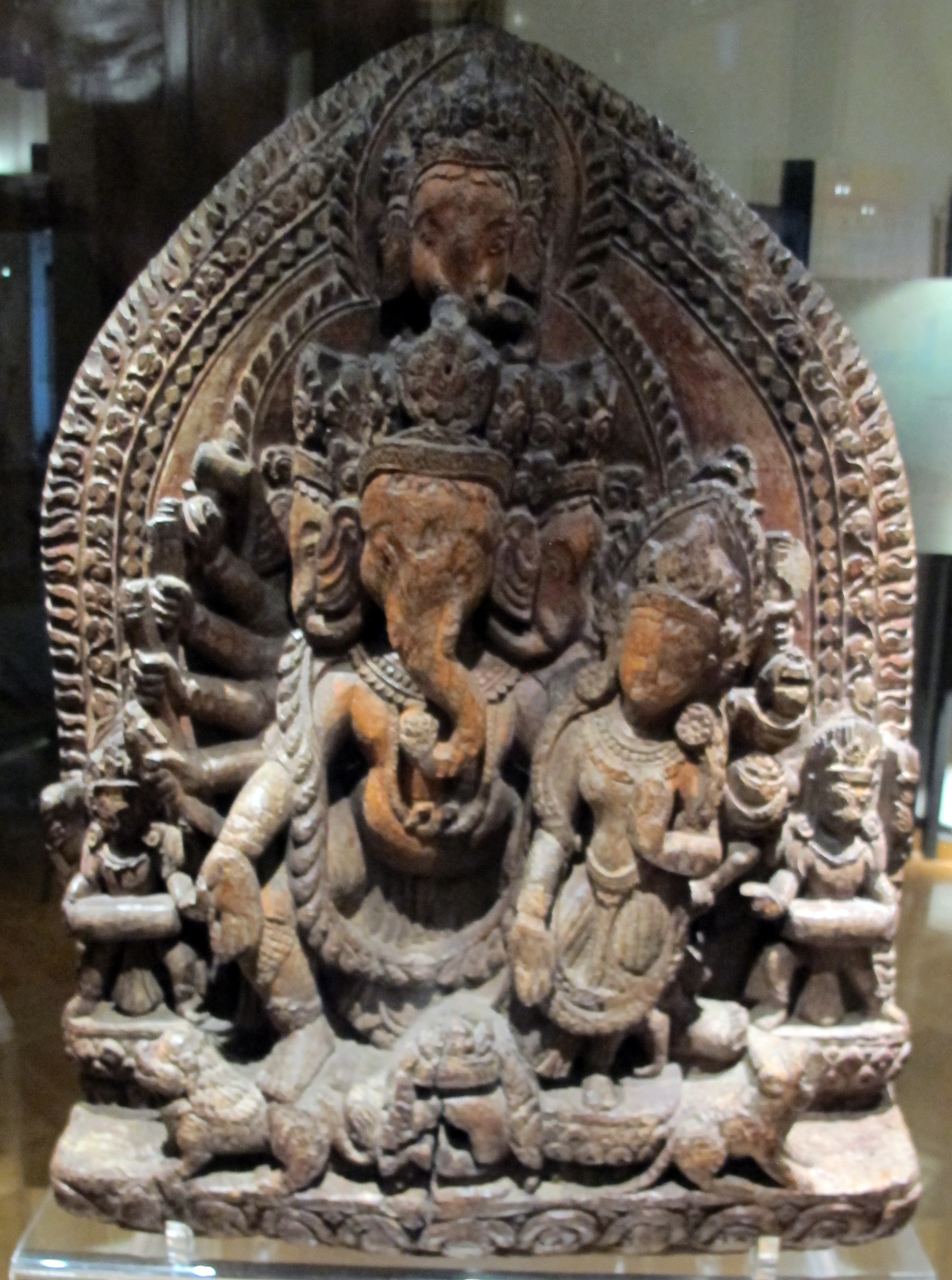
Heramba with consort, 18th-century Nepal.

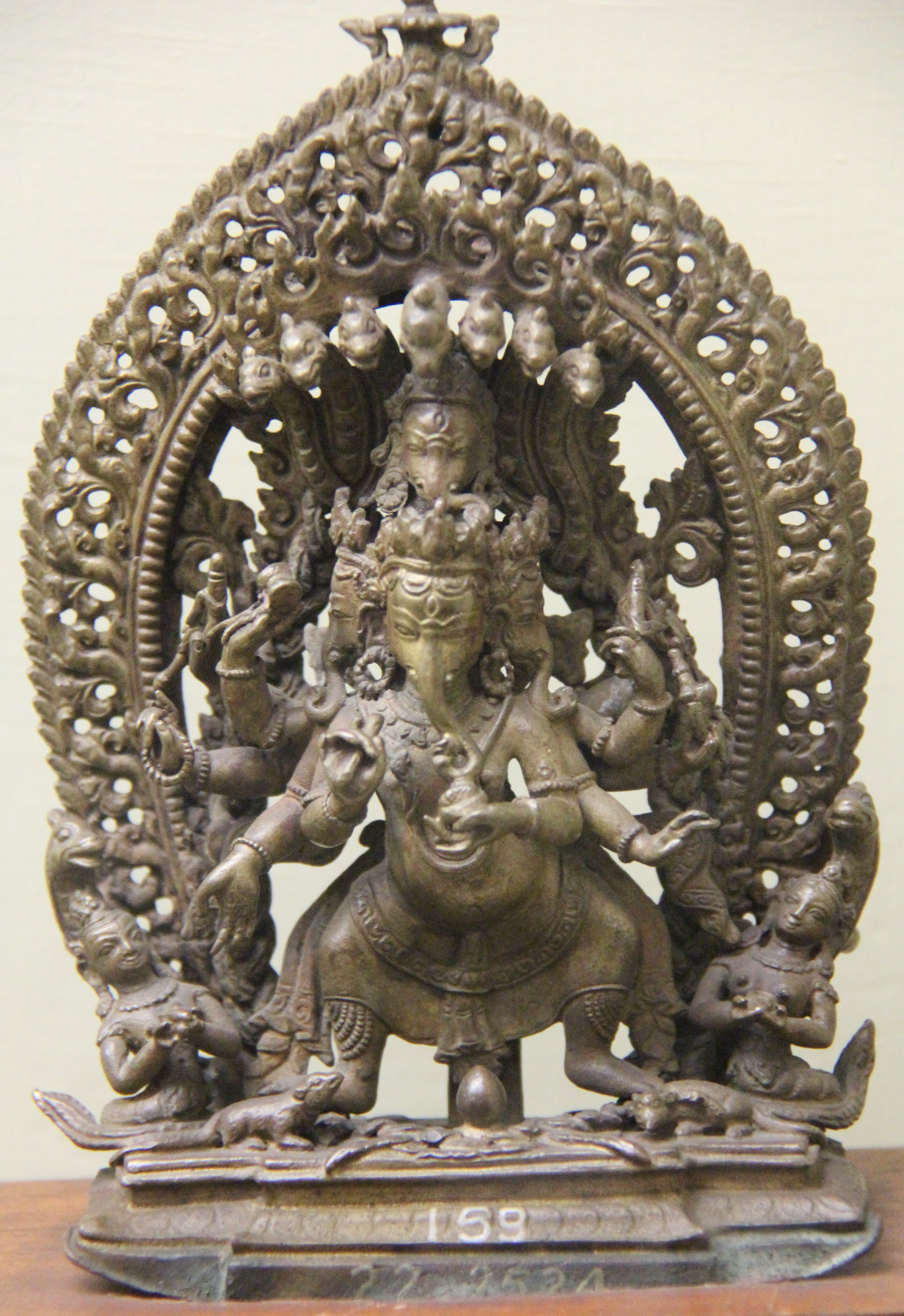
Heramba Ganapati idol on display at Chhatrapati Shivaji Maharaj Vastu Sangrahalaya , Mumbai. Idol dates back to 19 century CE; originating from Nepal.

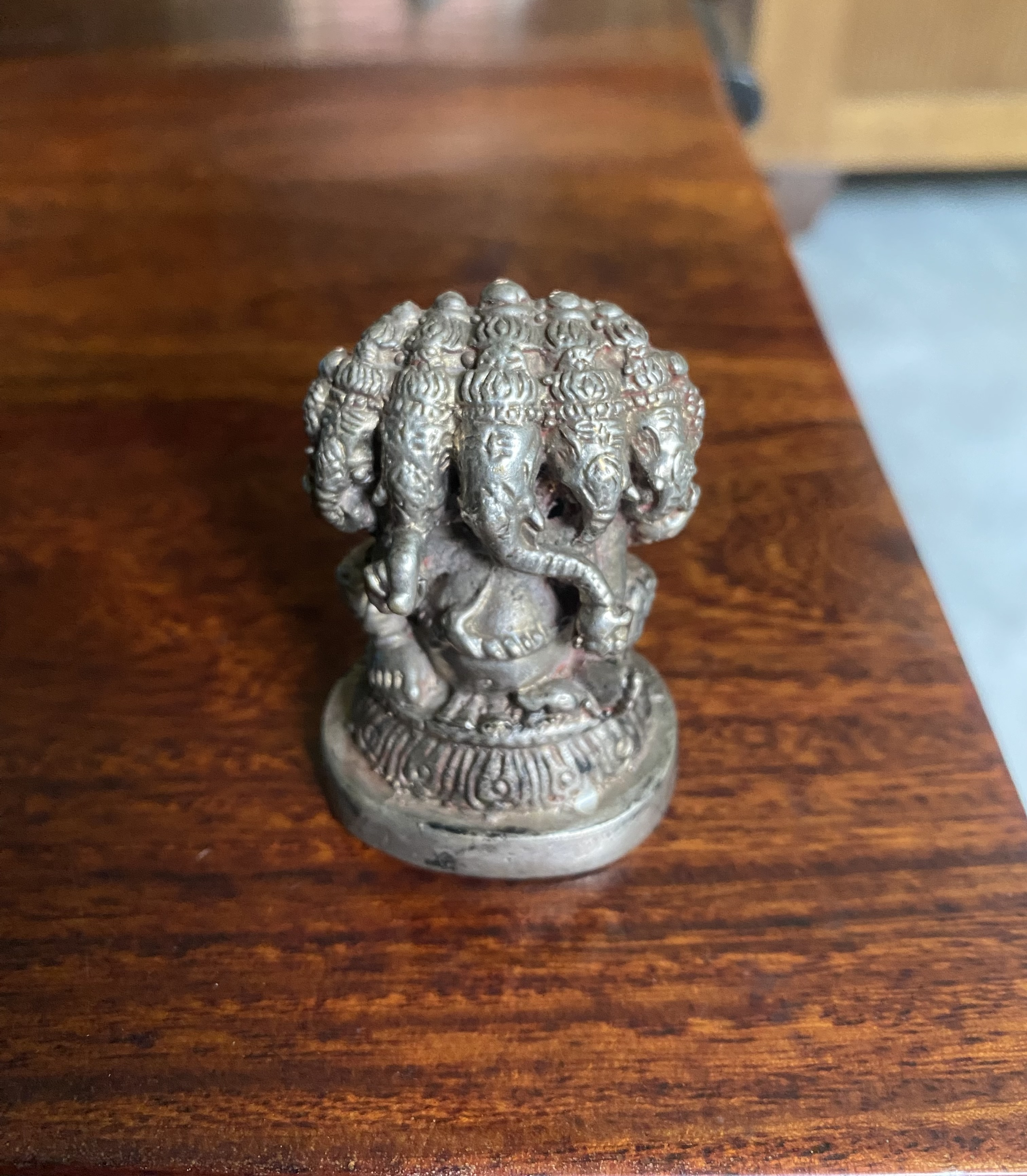
Heramba Ganesha statue from Laos

Heramba is described having five elephant heads, four facing the cardinal directions while the fifth at the top looking upwards. The colours of Heramba's heads closely relate to five aspects of his father Shiva – Ishana, Tatpurusha, Aghora, Vamadeva and Sadyojata. The five heads symbolize his power. He should be golden yellow in colour. Sometimes, he is described to be white in complexion.

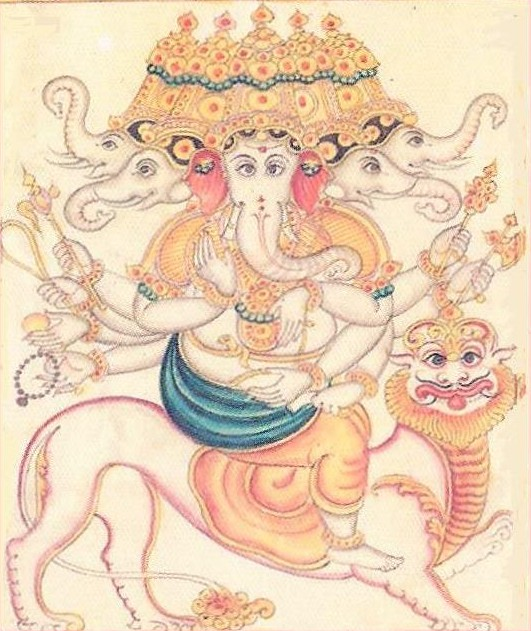
Heramba Ganapati, folio from the Sritattvanidhi (19th century).

Heramba rides his vahana, a mighty lion. The lion, represents the deity's royalty and fierce nature. The lion is said to be inherited from his mother Parvati, who often rides it. Though the lion primarily appears as the vahana of this aspect, Dinka, the usual vahana of Ganesha - a rat or a mouse - may also be included in the depiction. In an 11th–13th-century depiction in Odisha, Dinka the rat is depicted on a pedestal besides the seated Heramba. In a depiction in Bhaktapur, Nepal; Heramba stands on two rats. In Nepal, Heramba is generally depicted with a lion as well as Dinka.

Heramba has ten arms. As per descriptions in iconographical treatises, he holds a pasha (noose), danta (his broken tusk), akshamala (rosary), a parashu (battle-axe), a three-headed mudgara (mallet) and the sweet modak. Two other arms are held in Varadamudra (the boon-giving gesture) and Abhayamudra (a gesture denoting protection of the devotee). Other descriptions add a garland and a fruit to the attributes in his hand. He may be depicted in sculpture holding an ankusha (an elephant goad) in one of his hands. Sometimes, a consort may be depicted seated on his lap and one of Heramba's arms cuddles her.

== Worship ==
Heramba is a protector of the weak. Heramba also has the power to confer fearlessness and bring defeat or destruction to one's enemies.

Heramba is popular in the Tantric worship of Ganesha. The Hairamba or Heramba sect is a Tantric sect that worship Ganesha with Devi or Shakti (the Hindu goddess) as his mother and consort of his father Shiva. Like a number of other Hindu deities, Heramba was also associated with the six "fearful abhichara rites" (use of spells for malevolent purposes) by which an adept is said to gain the power to cause a victim to suffer delusions, be overcome with irresistible attraction or envy, or be enslaved, paralysed or killed.

== See also ==
- Herambasuta
- Kartikeya
