= Mudgala =

Sage in Hinduism

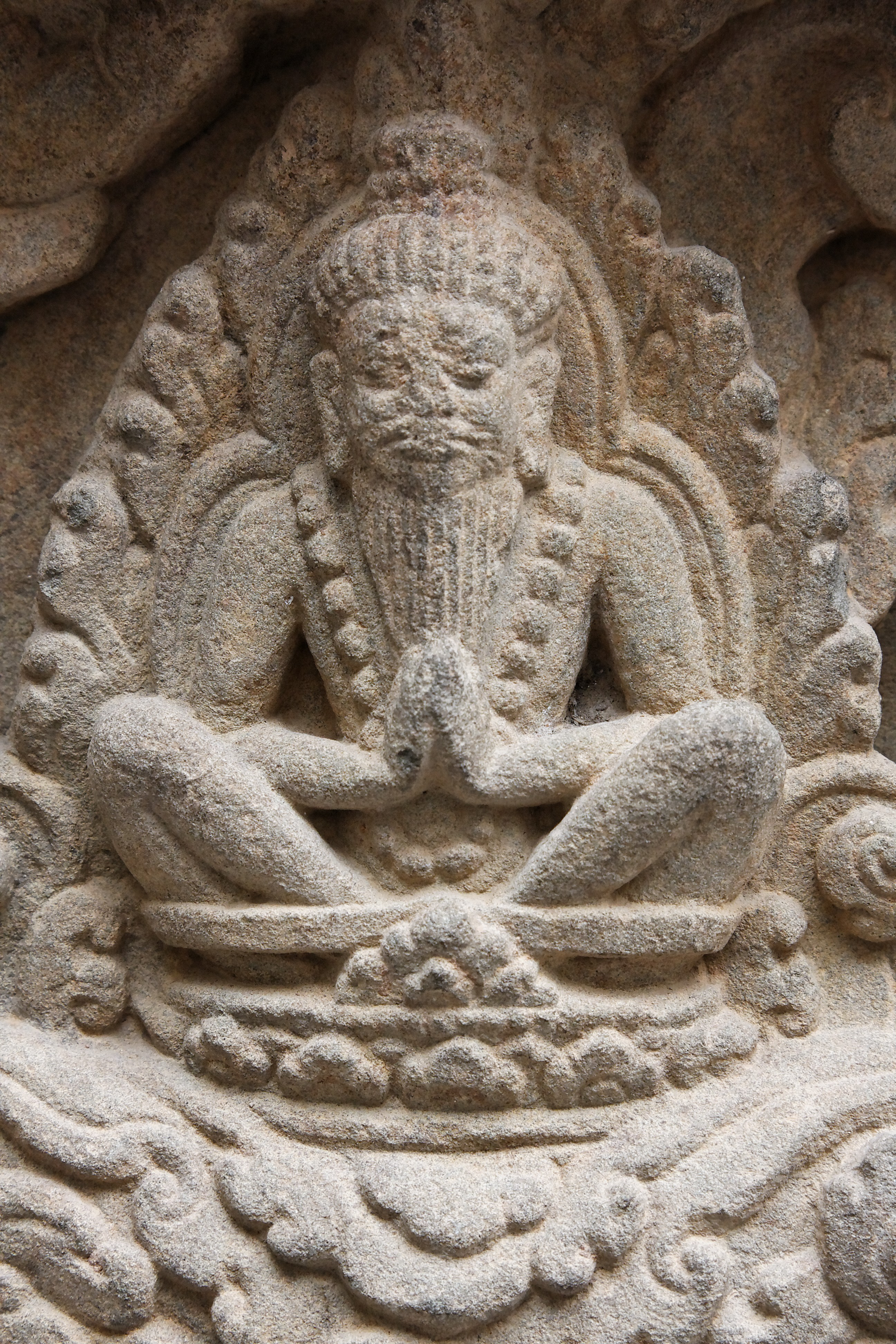
- Sculpture of Mudgala.
- Devanagari: मुद्गल
- Affiliation: Hinduism
- Adherents: Vaishnavism
- Texts: Mudgala Upanishad, Mudgala Purana, and Ganesha Purana

Genealogy
- Parents: Bharmyāśva (father)
- Consort: Nalayani (Indrasena)
- Children: Vadhryasva, Divodasa, Ahalya

Mudgala (Sanskrit: मुद्गल, romanized: Mudgala), sometimes also rendered Maudgalya (Sanskrit: मौद्गल्य, romanized: Maudgalya), is a rishi (sage) in Hinduism. Leading a life of poverty and piety, he is regarded to have mastered the attainment of the state of nirvana. The Maudgalya Brahmanas claim their descent from this sage.

== Legend ==
The Mahabharata offers an account of Mudgala, a virtuous sage who lived in Kurukshestra with his wife, Nalayani, also called Indrasena, and his son. He is said to have subsisted merely on grains of rice, and performed a rite known as ishtikrita. He is described to have been so devoted that Indra and the devas themselves appeared in his abode in person to partake in his sacrifices on the full moon and the new moon. Whenever he offered grains of rice to his learned guests, they increased hundredfold, so that all the Brahmins who visited were able to be satiated.

=== Origin of Draupadi ===
According to legend, pleased by the devotion of his young wife towards him, despite his old age, he offered her a boon of her choice. Nalayani wished to lead an amorous life with him. Mudgala granted his boon, and the two started to enjoy a sexual lifestyle. When the sage assumed the form of a mountain, she became a river that flowed from him; when he became a flowering tree, she became a creeper upon him. After millennia of enjoying such an erotic life, the sage grew tired of it, and returned to his austere lifestyle. Nalayani begged him to continue his sexual relationship with her for a while longer. Angry with the lustful nature of his wife, Mudgala cursed her to be born as the daughter of the King of Panchala in her next life, when she would have five husbands to satisfy her needs. Thus, Nalayani was born as Draupadi in her next life on earth.

=== Cursing Ravana ===
The Ramayana states that Mudgala was once engaged in a yogic position called the Svastikāsana, where he rested his shoulders upon his staff. Ravana came across the sage in the Kadamba forest, and observing him meditating in this odd position, playfully tapped the sage's staff with his sword, the chandrahasa. Mudgala's staff broke, and the sage fell upon the earth, breaking his spine. Furious, he cursed Ravana, making his sword ineffective thenceforth.

=== Durvasa's test ===
In the Mahabharata, having heard about Mudgala's austere lifestyle, Sage Duravasa visited his ashrama in order to test him. Appearing before the sage's presence in the nude, he demanded food from him. Unprovoked, Mudgala offered Durvasa all the food that he had. After eating his meal, Durvasa smeared the leftovers all over his body. This continued for a few days, and Mudgala never rose to anger, ignoring all of Durvasa's eccentric behaviours. Pleased, Durvasa decided that Mudgala would go to Svargam, with his present body intact. A heavenly charioteer brought his vimana before the sage, announcing to the latter that he had achieved nirvana, and would now travel to the abode of the devas. After enquiring regarding the pros and cons of being in Svargam, Mudgala chose to stay on earth. In Vaishnava additions of the legend, Mudgala enquired regarding the existence of a realm that was free of the defects of Svargam. The charioteer told him about Vishnu's supreme abode of light, called the Parama Padam, which was free of all attachments.

== Literature ==
Rishi Mudgala's genealogy is mentioned in Bhagavata Purana. The verse goes:

The son of Śānti was Suśānti, the son of Suśānti was Puruja, and the son of Puruja was Arka. From Arka came Bharmyāśva, and from Bharmyāśva came five sons — Mudgala, Yavīnara, Bṛhadviśva, Kāmpilla and Sañjaya. Bharmyāśva prayed to his sons, “O my sons, please take charge of my five states, for you are quite competent to do so.” Thus his five sons were known as the Pañcālas. From Mudgala came a dynasty of brāhmaṇas known as Maudgalya. (S.B. 9.21.31-33)

In the Bhagavata Purana, Ugrashravas describes the divisions of the Vedas. It is said that from the heart of Brahma came a transcendental vibration, and from this sound came the potent syllable, om. Using this om, Brahma created the original Vedas and taught them to his sons, Marīci and others, who were all saintly leaders of the Brahmin class. This body of Vedic knowledge was handed down through the disciplic succession of spiritual masters until the end of Dvapara-yuga, when Vyasa divided it into four parts, and instructed various schools of sages in these four samhitas. In Canto 12, Chapter 6, Verse 57, Rishi Mudgala is again mentioned as the disciple of disciple of Vyasa, who was determined qualified and responsible to protect a collection.

The son of Māṇḍūkeya, named Śākalya, divided his own collection into five, entrusting one subdivision each to Vātsya, Mudgala, Śālīya, Gokhalya and Śiśira. (ŚB 12.6.57)

In the same Purana, it is mentioned that Mudgala attained moksha:

Hariścandra, Rantideva, Uñchavṛtti Mudgala, Śibi, Bali, the legendary hunter and pigeon, and many others have attained the permanent by means of the impermanent. (ŚB 10.72.21)

He is called Uñchavṛtti here because Mudgala lived by gathering grains left behind in the fields after the harvest.

== See also ==
- Draupadi
- Vishvamitra
- Vyasa
