= Bala Ganapati =

Aspect of the Hindu god Ganesha

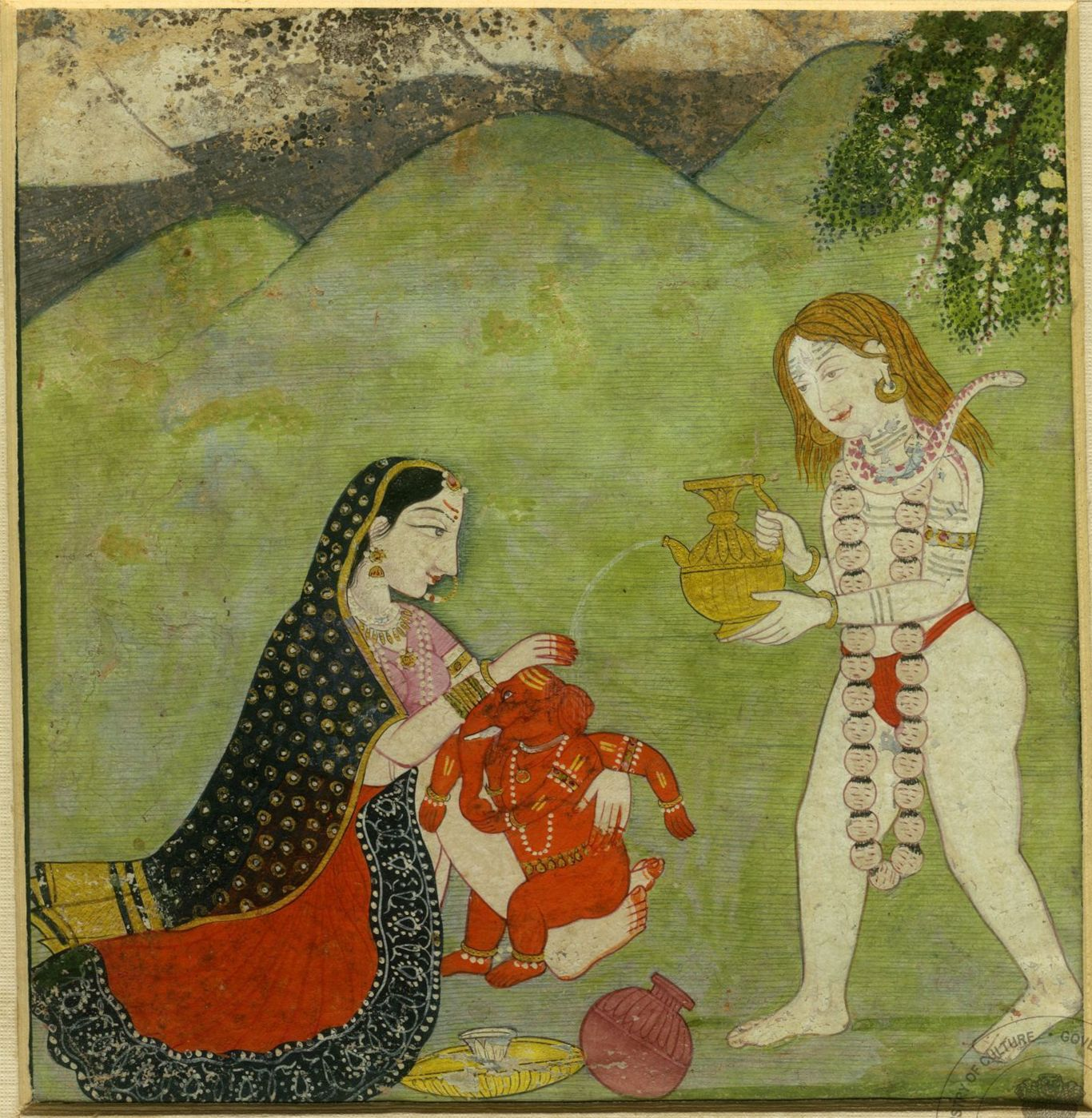
Bala Ganapati being bathed by his parents, 18th century Kangra painting

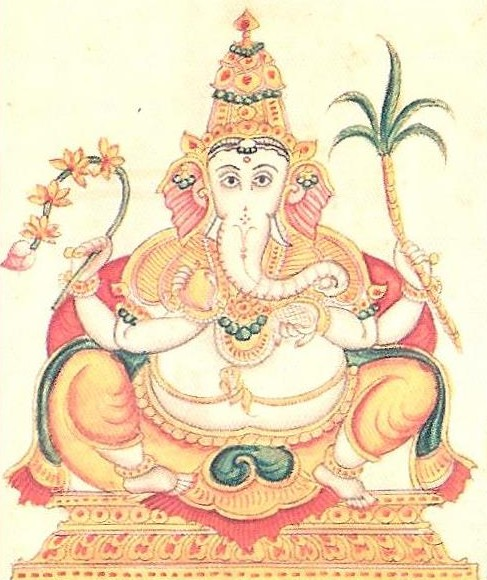
Bala Ganapati, Folio from the Sritattvanidhi (19th century)

Bala Ganapati (Sanskrit: बाल-गणपति, bāla-gaṇapati, literally "child Ganapati") is an aspect of the Hindu god Ganesha (Ganapati), the elephant-headed of wisdom and fortune, depicted as a child.

There are few portrayals of Ganesha as a small boy caressed by his parents, Parvati and Shiva. An infant Ganesha is also depicted held in his mother Parvati's lap or over her shoulder.

Independent portrayals of Bala Ganapati depict as seated or crawling. A bronze from South India shows Ganesha as an infant crawling on his knees. He has four arms. While two of them hold sweet balls, his trunk holds his favourite sweet, the modaka and curves towards his open mouth, indicating that he is about to eat the sweet.

Bala Ganapati is also the first of the thirty-two forms of Ganesha listed in the Sritattvanidhi. He has an elephant head and is depicted like a child. Sometimes, he is described to have a childlike facial expression, and not as a child. He wears a garland of fresh flowers. He has four arms and holds a mango, a branch of the mango tree, a sugarcane rod and a sweet-cake. Another description states that he carries a mango, a banana, a jackfruit and a sugarcane stalk. These objects signify the "abundance and fertility' of the earth. The jackfruit may be replaced with a bunch of flowers. In his trunk, he holds a modaka or a wood apple. He is described to be red-complexioned like rays of the rising sun (balasurya.b, child Sun). In other accounts, he is said to be golden in colour.

The child god represents the future opportunities of growth. He is prescribed to be worshipped by children to gain good manners. He is also said to grant a child's joy and good health to his devotee. There are also some shrines in South India dedicated to Ganesha as a two-armed small boy, where he is known as Pillaiyar ("little child").
