= Sahasranama =

Genre of Hindu literature

Sahasranāma (Sanskrit: सहस्रनाम) is a Sanskrit term which means "a thousand names". It is also a genre of stotra literature, usually found as a title of the text named after a deity, such as the Vishnu Sahasranāma, wherein the deity is remembered by 1,000 names, attributes or epithets.

As stotras, Sahasra-namas are songs of praise, a type of devotional literature. The word is a compound of sahasra "thousand" and nāman "name". A Sahasranāma often includes the names of other deities, suggesting henotheistic equivalence and/or that they may be attributes rather than personal names. Thus the Ganesha Sahasranama list of one thousand names includes Brahma, Vishnu, Shakti, Shiva, Rudra, SadaShiva and others. It also includes epithets such as Jiva (life force), Satya (truth), Param (highest), Jnana (knowledge) and others. The Vishnu Sahasranama includes in its list work and jñāna-yājna (offering of knowledge) as two attributes of Vishnu. The Lalita Sahasranama, similarly, includes the energies of a goddess that manifest in an individual as desire, wisdom and action.

A sahasranama provides a terse list of attributes, virtues and legends symbolized by a deity. There are also many shorter stotras, containing only 108 names (108 being a sacred number in Dharmic religions) and accordingly called ashtottara-shata-nāma.

== Chronology ==
The sahasranamas such as the Vishnu Sahasranama, are not found in early Samhita manuscripts, rather found in medieval and later versions of various Samhitas. One of the significant works on Sahasranama is from the sub-school of Ramanuja and the Vishnu Sahasra-namam Bhasya (commentary) by 12th-century Parasara Bhattar.

== Type ==
Sahasranamas are used for recitals, in ways such as:

- sravana, listening to recitals of names and glories of God
- nama-sankirtana (nāma-sankīrtana), reciting the names of God either set to music or not
- smarana, recalling divine deeds and teaching of divine deeds.
- archana (arcanā), worshipping the divine with ritual repetition of divine names.

== Hinduism ==
Some well-known sahasranāmas include:

- The Vishnu Sahasranama, of which the most popular version is found in the Anushasana Parva (13.135) of the Mahabharata. Other versions are found in many Puranas linked to Vaishnavism.
- The Shiva Sahasranama, which is also found in the Anushasana Parva (13.17) of the Mahabharata. Seven other versions also exist.
- The Lalita Sahasranama, which is a Shaktist stotra. This Devi-related work is found in the Brahmāṇḍa Purāṇa.
- The Ganesha Sahasranama, found in the Ganesha Purana.
- The Hanuman Sahasranama, is a Hanuman stotra told by Valmiki. Its origin is unknown, but it is often attributed to the deity Rama.

Tantrikas chant the Bhavani Nāma Sahasra Stuti and the Kali Sahasranāma. While the Vishnu and Shiva Sahasranāmas are popular amongst all Hindus, the Lalita Sahasranama is mostly chanted in South India. The Ganesha Sahasranama is mainly chanted by Ganapatya, the Bhavani Nāma Sahasra Stuti is the choice of Kashmiri Paṇḍits, and the Kali Sahasranāma is mostly chanted by Bengalis.

== Jainism ==
Jina-sahasranama is a stotra text of Jainism, with thousand names of Jinasena, Ashadhara and Banarasidas, Arhannamasahasrasamuccaya by Acarya Hemacandra.

== Sikhism ==
Guru Arjan of Sikhism, along with his associates, are credited with Sukhmani Sahasranama, composed in gauri raga, based on Hindu Puranic literature, and dedicated to Waheguru. This 17th-century Sikh text is entirely dedicated to bhakti themes.

== See also ==
- Bhakti
- Names of God
- Bhadrakalpikasutra (thousand names of Buddha, a Buddhist text)
