= Haridra Ganapati =

Aspect of the Hindu god Ganesha

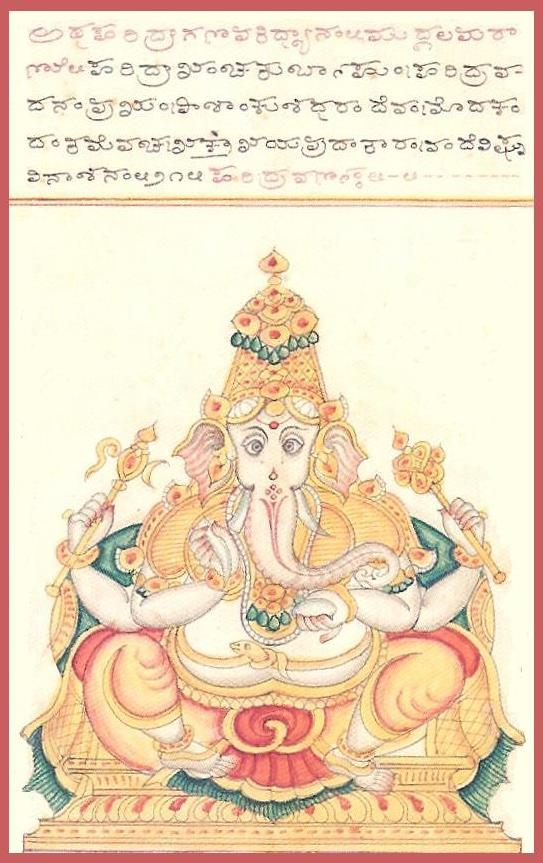
Haridra Ganapati, folio from the Sritattvanidhi (19th century)

Haridra Ganapati (Sanskrit: हरिद्रा-गणपति, Haridrā-gaṇapati, literally "turmeric Ganesha") is an aspect of the Hindu god Ganesha (Ganapati). Haridra Ganapati is also known as Ratri Ganapati. Haridra Ganapati is depicted as yellow like turmeric and wears yellow garments. He is one of the most popular thirty-two forms of Ganesha.

== Iconography ==
The iconographical treatises Niyotsava and the Mantra-maharnava have similar descriptions of Haridra Ganapati. He is described as having three eyes. He sits on a golden throne. He is yellow-complexioned like turmeric and also wears yellow clothes. He has four arms and carries a pasha (noose), an ankusha (elephant goad), a modaka (sweet) and the danta (his own broken tusk) in his four hands. He draws his devotees closer by the noose, while goads them in the right direction by the ankusha.

The Dakshinamnaya mentions that Haridra Ganapati has six arms and sits on a jewelled throne, in addition to his yellow colour and yellow vestments. His three right hands hold the ankusha and display the krodha-mudra (the gesture of anger) and abhayamudra (the gesture of protection). His left hands carry the pasha, a parashu (battle-axe) and displays the varadamudra (gesture of boon-giving).

Other references to the deity describe his face to be ointed with turmeric; him wearing a yellow yagnopavita ("sacred thread") besides his turmeric complexion and clothes. He is described holding a pasha, an ankusha and a staff.

In the Ajitāgama, Haridra Ganapati is described as turmeric-colored and flanked by two unnamed wives.

== Worship ==
Haridra Ganapati is worshipped for wealth and well-being. He is also described to protect his devotees.

Haridra Ganapati is the patron of the Haridra Ganapatya sect, one of the six major schools of the Ganapatya sect, which regards Ganesha as the Supreme Being. The Haridra Ganapati followers consider him as leader of all deities including Brahma, Vishnu, Shiva and Indra; the guru of the sage Bhrigu, the guru of gods – Brihaspati, the serpent Shesha etc.; the one which the greatest knowledge and the one is worshipped by the deities who create the universe. Worshipping Haridra Ganapati is believed to grant moksha (emancipation). These sectarians used to brand by iron the head of Ganesha and his tusk on their palms.

Haridra Ganapati is a Tantric form of Ganesha. Special mantras and yantras are used in his worship. Rituals involving his worship generally are performed to fulfill material objectives, especially gaining boons related to sexuality. He is also associated with six rituals of abhichara (uses of spells for malevolent purposes) by which the adept can cause the target to suffer delusions, be overcome with irresistible attraction or envy, or to be enslaved, paralysed or killed.
