= Mahaganapati =

Aspect of the Hindu god Ganesha

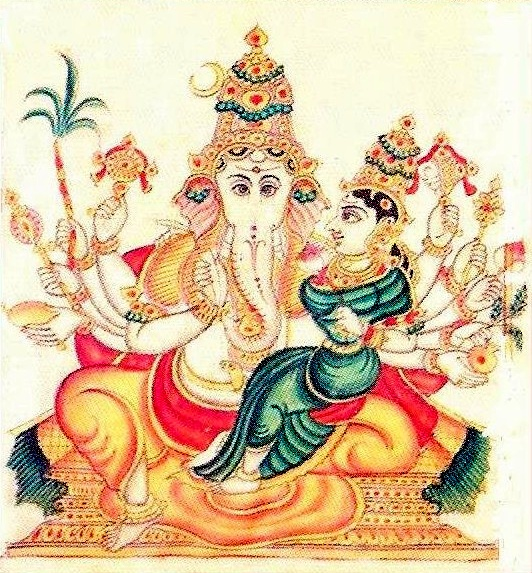
Mahaganapati, folio from the Sritattvanidhi (19th century). Here he is depicted with ten arms and accompanied by a goddess.

Mahaganapati (Sanskrit: महागणपति, mahā-gaṇapati), literally "Ganesha, the Great"), also spelled as Maha Ganapati, and frequently called Mahaganadhipati, is an aspect of the Hindu god Ganesha. He is the representation of Ganesha as the Supreme Being Paramatman and is the most important deity of the Ganesha-centric Ganapatya sect. He is one of the most popular of the thirty-two forms of Ganesha, worshipped as a representation of the ultimate truth Para brahman.

Mahaganapati is depicted as elephant-headed with ten arms carrying various objects and is accompanied by a goddess.

== Iconography ==
Like all aspects of Ganesha, Mahaganapati has an elephant head. Sindoor, is generally used for his red colour, in depictions. His colour is a reference to the dawn. He is often depicted with a third eye on his forehead, a crescent moon over his head, ten arms which hold; a lotus, a pomegranate fruit, a gada (mace), a chakra (discus), his own broken tusk, a pasha (noose), a jewelled water vessel or a pot of jewels, a blue lotus, a rice sprig and a sugarcane bow.

An alternate depiction replaces the pomegranate with a mango and the gada with a shankha (conch) and elaborates that the jewelled pot contains amrita (ambrosia). Yet another description suggests that the objects in his ten hands are gifts from other deities and symbolize his powers to perform the tasks of all deities and his supremacy over the pantheon. He sometimes holds a citron fruit with numerous seeds, a symbol of the power of creation and a representation the god Shiva. The sugarcane bow is associated with Kamadeva, the god of love; while the rice paddy functions as an arrow bestowed by the Earth goddess Prithvi; both symbols of fertility. The chakra is a common weapon of Vishnu, while the gada represents his boar avatar, Varaha. The jewelled pot – which may be depicted in his trunk – denotes Kubera, the god of wealth. It also represents the fortune and blessings bestowed by Mahaganapati on his devotees.

Rao classifies Mahaganapati as one of the five Shakti-Ganesha icons, where Ganesha is depicted with either Riddhi/Siddhi that is, a female consort. A white-complexioned Siddha Lakshmi sits on his left lap as his shakti. She holds a lotus (a symbol of purity) in her left hand and hugs the god with her other hand. A text also calls her Pushti ("nourishment"). The left hand of the god holds a blue lotus and embraces the goddess.

Various deities and demons surround the god.

== Worship ==
Mahaganapati represents Ganesha as the Supreme Being and thus the most important deity of the Ganapatya sect, which accords the status of the Supreme God to Ganesha. He is a widely worshipped and widely depicted form of Ganesha. The icon symbolizes happiness, wealth and magnificence of Ganesha.

Mahaganapati is the patron of the Maha-ganapatya sect, one of the six chief schools of the Ganapatyas. They regard Mahaganapati as the great Creator. Mahaganapati is believed to have existed before the creation of the universe and will exist after its dissolution (pralaya). He creates the god Brahma, who aids in creation of the universe and all other beings. One who meditates on this form of Ganesha is said to obtain Supreme Bliss.

In a Tantric context, Mahaganapati is associated with six rituals of abhichara (uses of spells for malevolent purposes) by which the adept can cause the target to suffer delusions, be overcome with irresistible attraction or envy, or to be enslaved, paralysed or killed.

Mahaganapati is enshrined in the Ranjangaon Ganpati temple, one of the eight Ashtavinayak temples. According to local legend, Mahaganapati had aided his father Shiva to fight the demon Tripurasura. Shiva had forgotten to pay his respects to Mahaganapati before starting the battle against the demon. An enraged Mahaganapati caused Shiva's chariot to fail. Shiva realized his mistake and paid his respects to his son and then was successful in defeating the demon.
