= Para Brahman =

Metaphysical concept, Supreme Brahman in Hinduism

Om signifies the essence of Brahman, the ultimate reality.

Para Brahman (Sanskrit: परब्रह्म, romanised: parabrahma) in Hindu philosophy is the "Supreme Brahman" that which is beyond all descriptions and conceptualisations. It is described as beyond the form or the formlessness (in the sense that it is devoid of Maya) that eternally pervades everything, everywhere in the universe and whatever is beyond.

Para Brahman is conceptualised in diverse ways. In the Advaita Vedanta tradition, the Para Brahman is a synonym of nirguna brahman, i.e., the attribute-less Absolute, which, according to Advaita Vedanta, transcends conceptualisation, including both emptiness and infiniteness. Conversely, in Dvaita Vedanta and Vishistadvaita Vedanta traditions, the Para Brahman is defined as saguna brahman, i.e., the Absolute with attributes. In Vaishnavism, Shaivism, and Shaktism, Vishnu, Shiva, and Adi Shakti respectively are Para Brahman. Mahaganapati is held to be Para Brahman by the Ganapatya sect, Kartikeya by the Kaumaram.

== Etymology ==
Para is a Sanskrit word that means "higher" in some contexts, and "highest or supreme" in others.

Brahman in Hinduism connotes the Absolute and the Ultimate Reality in the universe. In major schools of Hindu philosophy it is the immaterial, efficient, formal and final cause of all that exists. Brahman is a key concept found in the Vedas and is extensively discussed in the early Upanishads and in Advaita Vedanta literature.

== Advaita Vedanta ==
In Advaita Vedanta, the Para Brahman is defined as nirguna brahman, or Brahman without form or qualities. It is a state of complete knowledge of self as being identical with the transcendental Brahman, a state of mental-spiritual enlightenment (Jñāna yoga). It contrasts with Saguna Brahman which is a state of loving awareness (Bhakti yoga). Advaita Vedanta non-dualistically holds that Brahman is divine, the Divine is Brahman, and this is identical to that which is Atman (one's soul, innermost self) and nirguna (attribute-less), infinite, love, truth, knowledge, "being-consciousness-bliss".

According to Eliot Deutsch, Nirguna Brahman is a "state of being" in which all dualistic distinctions between one's own soul and Brahman are obliterated and are overcome. In contrast, Saguna Brahman is where the distinctions are harmonised after duality between one's own soul and Brahman has been accepted.

Advaita describes the features of a nondualistic experience, in which a subjective experience also becomes an "object" of knowledge and a phenomenal reality. The Absolute Truth is both subject and object, so there is no qualitative difference:

- The knowers of Truth declare knowledge alone as the Reality——that knowledge which does not admit of duality (the distinction of subject & object), in other words, which is indivisible & one without a second, & which is called by different names such as Brahman (the Absolute), Paramatma (the Supreme Spirit or Oversoul) & Bhagavan (the Deity). (Bhagavata Purana 1.2.11) (Note: vadanti tat tattva-vidas tattvam, yaj jnanam advayam brahmeti paramatmeti, bhagavan iti sabdyate)
- "Whoever realises the Supreme Brahma attains to supreme felicity. That Supreme Brahma is Eternal Truth (satyam), Omniscient (jnanam), Infinite (anantam)." (Taittiriya Upanishad 2.1.1) (Note: brahma-vid apnoti param, tad eshabhyukta, satyam jnanam anantam brahma)

The Upanishads state that the Supreme Brahma is Eternal, Conscious, and Blissful sat-chit-ânanda. The realisation of this truth is the same as being this truth:

- "The One is Bliss. Whoever perceives the Blissful One, the reservoir of pleasure, becomes blissful forever." (Taittiriya Upanishad 2.7.1–2) (Note: raso vai sa, rasam hy evayam labdhvanandi bhavati)
- "Verily know the Supreme One to be Bliss." (Brihadaranyaka Upanishad 2.9.28)

== Vaishnavism ==
In Vaishnavism, Vishnu is considered to be Para Brahman, especially in his form of Mahavishnu. He is also depicted as the Paramatman, according to the Narayana Sukta in the Yajurveda.

The Mahabharata describes Vishnu to be the Para Brahman, and is also identified with both purusha and prakriti. In the Bhagavata Purana, Narayana is described to be Para Brahman.

In Shuddhavaita, Vallabha praises Krishna as Para Brahman and considers Krishna as the "Brahman of the Upanishads, the Paramatman of the Smrti, and the Bhagavan of the Bhagavata".

== Shaivaism ==
In Shaivism, Shiva is regarded to be Para Brahman, especially in his form of Parashiva, the supreme form of Shiva. According to the Shiva Purana, Shiva is described to be the only deity to possess both nirguna and saguna attributes, causing him to be the only one worthy of the epithet Ishvara.

== Shaktism ==
In Shaktism, Adi Parashakti is considered to be the Para Brahman both with and without qualities, and also Brahman in its energetic state, the ultimate reality. According to the Devi Suktam and Sri Suktam in the Rigveda she is the womb of all creation. Thus Mahakali's epithet is Brahmamayi, meaning "She Whose Essence is Brahman". Tridevi is the supreme form of Adi Parashakti. Her eternal abode is called Manidvipa.

The Markandeya Purana describes the ten-headed Kāli as the Unborn, the Eternal, Mahamari and Lakshmi. In the Devi Bhagavata Purana, the four-armed Vishnu describes Mahā Kāli as Nirguna, creatrix and destructrix, beginningless and deathless. The Kāli Sahasranama Stotra from the Kalika Kulasarvasva Tantra states that she is supreme (paramā) and indeed Durga, Śruti, Smriti, Mahalakshmi, Saraswati, Ātman Vidya and Brahmavidya. In the Mahanirvana Tantra she is called Adya or Primordial Kali, who is the origin, protectress and devourer of all things. In Chapters 13 and 23 of Nila Tantra she is called the cause of everything, Gayatri, Parameshwari, Lakshmi, Mahāmāyā, omniscient, worshipped by Shiva himself, the great absolute (māhāparā), supreme (paramā), the mother of the highest reality (parāparāmba) and Ātman.

Mahā Kāli's own form is referred to as Para Brahman (parabrahmasvarūpiṇī) in the Devyāgama and different Tantra Shastras. She is also variously referred to as Soul of the universe, Paramatman, Bīja and Nirguna.

== See also ==
- Achintya Bheda Abheda – Philosophical school of Vedanta
- Adi Parashakti – Supreme goddess in Hinduism
- Ātman (Hinduism) – Hindu concept for inner self or essence as mere consciousness
- Bhakti – Devotional love, a concept in Indian religions
- Brahma – Creator god in Hinduism
- Jiva – Metaphysical entity believed to be imbued with a life force
- Jnana – "Knowledge" in Indian philosophy and religion
- Mahaganapati – Aspect of the Hindu god Ganesha
- Mahavishnu – Major deity in Hinduism
- Narayana – Epithet of the Hindu deity Vishnu
- Nonduality (spirituality) – Nonconceptual awareness and interconnectedness
- Oachira Temple
- Om – Sacred sound in Indian religions
- Padanilam Parabrahma Temple
- Paramatma – Absolute Atman, or supreme Self, in various philosophies
- Parashiva – Hindu deity
- Parbrahm Ashram – Hindu temple in Pakistan
- Svayam Bhagavan – Concept in Hinduism
- Vedanta – One of the six orthodox traditions of Hindu philosophy
- Yoga – Spiritual practices from ancient India
- Adi Shankaracharya – 8th-century Indian Vedic scholar

== Sources ==
- Deutsch, Eliot (1973), Advaita Vedanta: A Philosophical Reconstruction, University of Hawaii Press
- Fisher, Mary Pat (2012), Living Religions: A Brief Introduction
- Malkovsky, B. (1997), "The Personhood of Samkara's" Para Brahma"", The Journal of Religion, 77 (4): 541, doi:10.1086/490065, JSTOR 1206747, S2CID 170842690
- Sullivan, B.M. (2001), The A to Z of Hinduism, Rowman & Littlefield, ISBN 8170945216
- White, C.S.J. (1970), "Krsna as Divine Child", History of Religions, 10 (2): 156, doi:10.1086/462625, JSTOR 1061907, S2CID 162216194
- The Markandeya Purana: Translated with Notes. Translated by Pargiter, Frederick Eden. India: Asiatic Society. 1904 – via Wisdomlib.org.
- The Devi Bhagavata Purana. Translated by Vijñanananda, Swami. India: Allahabad Panini Office. 1921 – via Wisdomlib.org.
- The Great Liberation: Mahanirvana Tantra. Translated by Avalon, Arthur. Madras: Ganesh & Co. 1913a – via Archive.org.
- Brihan Nila Tantram. Translated by Kak, Ramachandra. Kashmir: The Kashmir Mercantile Press. 1938 – via Archive.org.
- Tantrik Texts (PDF). Translated by Avalon, Arthur. London: Luzac & Co. 1913b – via Archive.org.
