= Ganesha Sahasranama =

Hindu religious hymn

The Ganesha Sahasranama (Sanskrit: गणेशसहस्रनाम, romanized: gaṇeśasahasranāma) is a list of the names of Hindu deity Ganesha (Gaṇeśa). A sahasranama is a Hindu hymn of praise in which a deity is referred to by 1,000 or more different names. Ganesha Sahasranamas are recited in many temples today as a living part of Ganesha devotion.

There are two different major versions of the Ganesha Sahasranama, with subvariants of each version.

One major version appears in chapter I.46 of the Ganesha Purana (Gaṇeśa Purāṇa), an important scripture of the Ganapatya (Gāṇapatya). This version provides an encyclopedic review of Ganesha's attributes and roles as they were understood by the Ganapatya. A Sanskrit commentary on a subvariant of this version of the Ganesha Sahasranama was written by Bhaskararaya. (Bhāskararāya). Bhaskararaya titles his commentary Khadyota ("Firefly"), making a play on words based on two different meanings of this Sanskrit term. In his opening remarks Bhaskararaya says that some will say that because the commentary is very brief it is inconsequential like a firefly (khadyota) but to devotees it will shine like the sun (khadyota). The source text (Sanskrit:मूल; mūla) of Bhaskararaya's Khadyota commentary generally follows the text of the 1993 reprint edition Ganesha Purana (GP-1993) , but there are quite a few differences in names, and the versification differs slightly. There are enough differences so that the Bhaskararaya variant and the GP-1993 versions can be considered distinct.

There is a completely different second major version in which all of the names begin with the letter 'g' (ग्). The names and structure of this version bear no resemblance to the Ganesha Purana version.
