= Wood apple =

Wood apple is a common name for several trees of Aurantioideae with edible fruits and may refer to:

- Aegle marmelos ("Bael" in Hindi), a tree native to India
- Limonia acidissima ("Velaga-pandu" in Telugu, "Belada Hannu" in Kannada, "Velam Pazham" or "Vizhaam Pazham" in Tamil, "Diwul" [දිවුල්] in Sinhala, "Kanthu" by Bhola tribe), a tree native to South Asia and Southeast Asia east to Java
