= Herambasuta =

Indian Shakta yogi

Herambasuta (Devanagari:हेरम्बसुत, IAST:Heraṃbasuta) was an Indian Tantric yogi who belonged to the vamachara Ganapatya sect. The tenth century work Śaṅkaravijaya attributed to certain Ānandagiri mentions the cult of Ucchiṣṭa Gaṇapati led by Herambasuta. The name of the group derives from Ucchiṣṭa (leftovers) in reference to the foods left over at the end of the ritual to the deity. In Tantric context, food is deliberately left in the mouth in order to render them ritually impure. According to the scripture mentioned above, Herambasuta held many unorthodox views, and the worship included Pañca Makāra.

The form of worship Herambasuta expounded was : there was no caste restriction, promiscuity was allowed and the followers wore a red mark on the forehead. According to R. G. Bhandarkar it was an imitation of Kaula form of worship.
