= Thirty-two forms of Ganesha =

32 forms of Hindu god Ganesha

Thirty-two forms of Ganesha are mentioned frequently in devotional literature related to the Hindu god Ganesha. The Ganesha-centric scripture Mudgala Purana is the first to list them.

Detailed descriptions are included in the Shivanidhi portion of the 19th-century Kannada Sritattvanidhi. There are also sculptural representations of these thirty-two forms in the temples at Nanjangud and Chāmarājanagar (both in Mysore district, Karnataka), done about the same time as the paintings were done and also at the direction of the same monarch. Each of the thirty-two illustrations is accompanied by a short Sanskrit meditation verse (dhyānaśloka), written in Kannada script. The meditation verses list the attributes of each form. The text says that these meditation forms are from the Mudgala Purana.

In his review of how the iconographic forms of Ganapati shown in the Sritattvanidhi compare with those known from other sources, Martin-Dubost notes that the Sritattvanidhi is a recent text from South India, and while it includes many of Ganesha's forms that were known at that time in that area it does not describe earlier two-armed forms that existed from the 4th century, nor those with fourteen and twenty arms that appeared in Central India in the 9th and 10th centuries.

Ramachandra Rao says that:

The first sixteen of the forms of Gaṇapati shown [in the Sritattvanidhi] are more popularly worshipped under the name shoḍaśa-gaṇapati. Among them, the thirteenth, viz. Mahāgaṇapati, is especially widely worshipped. There is a tāntrik sect which is devoted to this form. Śakti-gaṇapati, Ucchishṭa-gaṇapati and Lakshmī-gaṇapati are also tāntrik forms, which receive worship which is cultic and esoteric. Heraṃba-gaṇapati is popular in Nepāl.

—

== List ==
Some of the details of the descriptions, such as the colors to be used in meditation upon the form, are taken from the meditation verses and may not correspond exactly to the pictures.

Name English Meaning	Image	Description atha dvātriṁshadgaṇapatInāṁ dhyānaṁ || mudgalapurāṇe ||
Bāla Gaṇapati "Childlike Ganapati"		tatra bālagaṇapatidhyānaṁ karasthakadalīcūta | panasekṣucamodakaṁ | bālasūryanibhaṁ vaṁde || devaṁ bālagaṇādhipaṁ || 1 || raktavarṇaḥ Adorned with a garland of tender flowers, having plantain (banana), mango, jack fruit, sugarcane and sweets (modaka) in His hands and who is effulgent like the rising sun (red color).
Taruṇa Gaṇapati "Youthful Ganapati"		atha taruṇagaṇapatidhyānaṁ || mudgalapurāṇe || pāshāṁkushāpūpakapitthajaṁbū | svadaṁtaśālīkṣumapi svahastaiḥ | dhatte sadāyastaruṇāruṇābhaḥ | pāyātsa yuṣmāṁstaruṇogaṇeshaḥ || 2 || raktavarṇaḥ "Carrying in His hands the noose, hook, rice-cake, guava fruit, rose apple, own (broken) tusk, bunch of corn ears (paddy) and sugarcane and who vividly shines forth with His brilliant youthfulness" (Red Color). (According to the Mudgala Purana version, kadubu - an edible specific to Lord Ganapati is mentioned instead of rice-cake).
Bhakti Gaṇapati "Devotee (Devotion) Ganapati"		atha bhaktagaNapatidhyAnaM || mudgalapurANE | nArikELAmrakadaLI | guDapAyasadhAriNaM | sharaccaMdrAbhavapuShaM | bhajE bhaktagaNAdhipaM ||3|| shvEtavarNaH Described as “ the Lord of His devotees and who shines like the autumn moon, with coconut, mango, plantain (banana), jaggery and sweets in his hands." (White Colour)
Vīra Gaṇapati "Valiant Ganapati"		atha vIragaNapatidhyAnaM || mudgalapurANE || bhEtALashaktisharakAr^mukacakraKaDga | KaTvAMgamudgaragadAMkushanAgapAshAn | shUlaM ca kuMtaparashuM dhvajamudvahaMtaM | vIraM gaNEshamaruNaM satataM smarAmi ||4 || rakatavarNaH "Armed with Bhetala, the weapon of power(shakti), arrow, bow, wheel(Chakra or discus), sword, club, hammer, mace, hook, nagapasha (serpent noose), spear, plough, and the shining axe." (Red Colour). (According to the Mudgala Purana version, flag is mentioned instead of plough).
Śakti Gaṇapati The "Powerful" Ganapati		atha shaktigaNapatidhyAnaM || mudgalapurANE || AliMgya dEvIM haritAMgayaShTiM | parasparAshliShTakaTipradEshaM | saMdhyAruNaM pAshasRuNI vahaMtaM | bhayApaham Sakti ganESameeDE | He is red in colour. He has four arms. His low right hand shows the movement of lack of fear (abhaya); the two others wear the elephant goad and the noose; the last hand, who holds a lemon, embraces the goddess. With the top of his trunk, Shakti Ganapati holds a cake.
Dvija Gaṇapati "Ganapati the Twice-Born"		atha dvijagaNapatidhyAnaM || mudgalapurANE || yaM pustukAkShaguNadaMDakamaMDala shrIvidyOtamAnakarabhUShaNa miMduvarNaM | staMbEramAnanacatuShTayashObhamAnaM | tvAM yaH smarEddvijagaNAdhipatE sadhanyaH ||6|| shubhravarNaH He has four heads and four arms. He is white in colour. His hands hold the rosary, the washing pot (kamandalu), the walking-stick of an ascetic or the ritual spoon (sruk) and the manuscript on palm-leaves (pustaka).
Siddhi Gaṇapati Ganapati bestowing success (Siddhi) or "The Accomplished Ganapati"		atha siddhagaNapatidhyAnaM || mudgalapurANE || pakvacUtaPalapuShpamaMjarI | mikShudaMDatilamOdakaisvaha | udvahanvarashumastu tE namashrI samRuddhiyutahEmapiMgaLa ||7|| piMgaLavarNaH Fond of the sesame cake. He has four arms. He is golden in colour. His hands hold the axe, the noose, the sugar-cane stem and the mango.
Ucchiṣṭa Gaṇapati "Ganapati devouring the remnants of the meal"		atha uCiShTagaNapatidhyAnaM || mudgalapurANE || nīlābjadāḍimīvīṇā śālīguṁjākṣasūtrakaṁ ǀ dadhaducciṣṭanāmāyaṁ gaṇēśaḥ pātu mēcakaḥ ǁ graṁthāṁtare | nārīyōnirasāsvada | lōlupaṁ kāmamōhitamiti ||8|| nīlavarṇaḥ He has six arms. He is blue in colour. His hands show the rosary, the pomegranate, the paddy ear (shalyagra), the nocturnal lotus, the lute (vîna); his sixth hand sometimes bears a guñja berry, embraces the goddess. The Ucchista Ganapati trunk is placed on the goddess's thigh.
Vighna Gaṇapati Ganapati - "Lord of Obstacles"		atha viGnagaNapatidhyAnaM || mudgalapurANE || shaMKEkShucApakusumEShukuThArapAsha | cakrasvadaMtasRuNimaMjarikAshanAdaiH | pANishritaiH parisamIhitabhUShaNashrI | viGnEshvarO vijayatE tapanIyagaura H || 9 || svarNavarNaH He has eight arms. He is golden in colour. His hands hold the single tusk, the disc, the arrow-flowers, the hatchet, the conch, the sugar-cane stem, the noose, the elephant goad. With the tip of his trunk, he carries a bunch of flowers (pushapamañjari)
Kṣipra Gaṇapati "Ganapati who is easy to Appease" or "Quick-acting Ganapati"		atha kShipragaNapatidhyAnaM || mudgalapurANE || daMtakalpalatApAsha | ratnakuMbhAMkushOjvalaM | baMdhUkakamanIyAbhaM | dhyAyEtkShipragaNAdhipaM ||10|| raktavarNaH He has four arms. He is red in colour. His hands show the single tusk, the elephant goad, the creeper of the votive tree (kalpalatâ), the noose. With the end of his trunk, he carries the stone cup full of precious stones (ratnakumbha).
Heramba Gaṇapati "Mother's Beloved Son" Ganapati		atha hEraMbagaNapatidhyAnaM || mudgalapurANE || abhayavaradahastaM pAshadaMtAkShamAlAsRuNiparashudadhAnaM mudgaraM mOdakaM ca | PalamadhigatasiMhaH paMcamAtaMgavaktrO | gaNapatiratigauraH pAtu hEraMbanAmA || 11 || gauravarNaH The five-headed Ganapati riding the lion. He has ten arms. He is dark in colour. His first hand shows the movement of lack of fear (abhaya), the others hold the rosary, the citron, the club, the elephant goad, the noose, the axe, the kadabu cake, the single tusk; his tenth hand shows the movement which bestows boons (varada).
Lakṣmī Gaṇapati/ Śrī Gaṇapati "Ganapati the Fortunate" similar to Goddess Lakṣmī		atha lakShmIgaNapatidhyAnaM || mudgalapurANE || bibhrANashshukabIjapUrakamiLanmANikyakuMbhAMkushA | npApAshaM kalpalatAM ca KaDgavilasajjyOtissudhAnirJaraH | shyAmEnAttasarOruhENa sahitaM dEvI dvayaM cAMtike | gaurAMgo varadAnahastasahito lakShmIgaNEshovatAt || 12 || gauravarNaH Embracing his wives Siddhi (Achievement) and Buddhi (Wisdom). He is white (fair) in colour. He has eight arms. His hands hold a pomegranate, a sword, the creeper of the votive tree, the elephant goad, the parrot, the noose, the jewel pot; his eighth hand bestows boons (varada).
Mahā Gaṇapati "The Great Ganapati"		atha mahAgaNapatidhyAnaM || mudgalapurANE|| hastIMdrAnanamiMducUDamaruNaCAyaM triNEtraM rasAdAshliShTaM priyayA sapadmakarayA svAMkastayA saMtataM| bIjApUragadEkShukArmukalasaccakrAbjapAshOtphala | vrIhyagrasvaviShANaratnakalashAnhastair^vahaMtaM bhajE ||13|| raktavarNaH With a shakti, He has ten hands. He is red in colour. His hands hold the single tusk, the pomegranate, the club, the sugar-cane bow, the disc, the conch, the noose, the nocturnal lotus, the paddy ear, the jewels pot.
Vijaya Gaṇapati "Ganapati the Victorious"		atha vijayagaNapatidhyAnaM ||mudgalapurANE || pAshAMkushasvadaMtAmraPalavAnAKuvAhanaH viGnaM nihaMtu nassarvaM | raktavarNO vinAyakaH ||14 || raktavarNaH Riding a rat which trots at a smart pace, He has four arms. He is red in colour. His hands hold the single tusk, the elephant goad, the noose and the mango.
Nṛtya Gaṇapati "Ganapati the Dancer"		atha nRuttagaNapatidhyAnaM || mudgalapurANE || pAshAMkushApUpakuThAradaMta caMcatkarAkluptavarAMguLIyakaM | pItaprabhaM kalpatarOradhastAM | bhajAmi nRuttOpapadaM gaNEshaM || 15 || pItavarNaH Dancing under the boon-tree, He has four arms. He is golden in colour. His hands hold the single tusk, the elephant goad, the noose, the axe (parashu) or the hatchet (kuthâra). The dhyâna sloka specifies that one of the four hands can show a cake apûpa.
Ūrdhva Gaṇapati "The Elevated Ganapati"		atha UrdhvagaNapatidhyAnaM || mudgalapurANE || kalhArashAlikamalEkShukacApabANa | daMtaprarOhagadabhRutkanakOjjvalAMgaH | AliMganOdyatakarO haritAMgayaShTyA | dEvyA karOtu shubhamUrdhvagaNAdhipomE ||16|| kanakavarNaH Seated with his Shakti on his left thigh, He has eight arms. He is golden in colour. His hands hold the single tusk, the arrow-flower, the daylight lotus, the blue lily (kalhara), the sugar-cane bow, the paddy ear, the club; his last hand claps the goddess. The extremity of his trunk is rolled around the right breast of the goddess.
Ekākṣara Gaṇapati Ganapati identified with "Single Syllable"(gaṃ).		atha EkAkSharagaNapatidhyAnaM || mudgalapurANE || raktO raktAMgarAgAMshukakusumayutastuMdilashcaMdramauLe | nesatraiyusaktastribhirvAmanakaracaraNo bIjapUraM dadhAnaH | hastAgrakluptapAshAMkusharadavaradO nAgavaktrOhibhUShO | dEvaH padmAsanasthO bhavatu suKakarO bhUtaye viGnarAjaH ||17|| raktavarNaH He has four arms. He is red in colour. His hands hold the single tusk, the elephant goad, the noose and the cake modaka. Sometimes, he wears, with the extremity of his trunk (bîjapûra).
Vara Gaṇapati The "Boon-giver" Ganapati		atha varagaNapatidhyAnaM || mudgalapurANE || siMdUrAbhamibhAnanaM triNayanaM hastE ca pAshAMkushau | bibhrANaM madhumatka pAlamanishaM sAdhviMdumauLiM bhajE || puShTyAshliShTatanuM dhvajAgrakarayA padmOllasaddhastayA | tadyOnyAhitapANimAttavasumatpAtrOllasatpuShkaraM ||18|| raktavaraNaH With a shakti seated on his left thigh, He has four arms. He is red in colour. His first three hands hold the elephant goad, the skull filled with liquor (madhumatkapâla) and the noose. The fourth hand creeps between the thighs of the goddess who holds a lotus and a banner.
Trayākṣara Gaṇapati Lord "of the Three-letters A+U+M" Ganapati		atha tryakShagaNapatidhyAnaM || mudgalapurANE || gajEMdravadanaM sAkShAccalatkarNaM sacAmaraM | hEmavarNaM caturbAhuM | pAshAMkushadharaM varaM | svadaMtaM dakShiNE hastE | savyE tvAmraPalaM tathA | puShkarE mOdakaM caiva | dhArayaMtaH manusmarEt ||19|| svarNavarNaH He has four arms. His hands hold the single tusk, the elephant goad, the noose and the mango. He holds the cake modaka with the trunk end.
Kṣipra Prasāda Gaṇapati Ganapati the "Quick-rewarder"		atha kShipraprasAdagaNapatidhyAnaM || mudgalapurANE || dhRutapAshAMkushakalpalatAsvaradashca bIjapUrayutaH | shashishakalakalitamaulistrilOcanO ruNashca gajavadanaH | bhUsurabhUShadIptO bRuhadudaraH padma viShvarollasitaH | viGnapayOdharapavanaH karadhRutakamalassadAstu mE bhUtyai ||20|| aruNavarNaH He has six arms. He is red in colour. His hands hold the single tusk, the elephant goad, the lotus, the creeper of the votive tree (kalpalatā), the noose, the lemon.
Haridrā Gaṇapati "The curcuma-colored Ganapati".		atha haridrAgaNapatidhyAnaM || mudgalapurANE|| haridrAbhaM caturbAhuM | haridrAvadanaM prabhuM | pAshAMkushadharaM dEvaM | mOdakaM daMtamEva ca | bhaktAbhayapradAtAraM | vaMdE viGnavinAshanaM ||21|| haridrAvarNaH He has four arms. He is yellow in colour. His hands hold the single tusk, the elephant goad, the noose and the cake modaka
Ekadanta Gaṇapati "The Single Tusked Ganapati".		atha EkadaMtagaNapatidhyAnaM || mudgalapurANE| laMbOdaraM shyAmatanuM gaNEshaM | kuThAramakSha srajamUrdhva gAtraM | salaDDukaM daMtamadhaH karAbhyAM | vAmEtarAbhyAM ca dadhAnamIDE ||22|| shyAmavarNaH He has four arms. He is blue in colour. His hands hold a large tusk, a rosary, a hatchet (kuthâra) and the small ball of sweets (laddu).
Sṛiṣṭi Gaṇapati "Ganapati the Creator",		atha sRuShTigaNapatidhyAnaM || mudgalapurANE|| pAshAMkushasvadaMtAmra| phalavAnAKuvAhanaH | viGnaMnihaMtu nashyONa| ssRuShTi dakShOvinAyakaH ||23|| raktavarNaH Riding a big rat, He is red in colour. He has four arms. His hands hold the single tusk, the elephant goad, the noose and the mango.
Uddaṇḍa Gaṇapati "Ganapati the Unchained",		atha uddaMDagaNapatidhyAnaM ||mudgalapurANE || kalhArAMbuja bIjapUraka gadAdaMtEkShucApaM sumaM | bibhrANO maNikuMbhashAli kalashau pAshaM sRuNiM cAbjakaM | gaurAMgyA rucirAraviMda karayA dEvyA samAliMgita | shshoNAMgashshubhamAtanOtu bhajatA muddaMDaviGnEshvaraH ||24|| raktavarNaH With his Shakti seated on his left thigh, He has twelve arms. He is red in colour. His hands hold the single tusk, the club, the nocturnal lotus, the noose, the paddy ear, the elephant goad, the washing pot (kamandalu), the sugar-cane bow, the disc, the daylight lotus, the conch and the pomegranate. His trunk is placed on the top of the goddesse's breast or, sometimes, maintains a jewels pot (manikumbha).
Ṛṇamocana Gaṇapati "Ganapati the liberator from debts"		atha RuNamOcanagaNapatidhyAnaM ||mudgalapurANE|| pAshAMkushau daMtajaMbU | dadhAnaH sphaTikaprabhaH | raktAMshukO gaNapati | rmudE syAdRuNamOcakaH ||25|| shvEtavarNaH Ganapati seated on a large lotus with his Shakti. He removes the impediment. He has four arms. He is white in colour. His first hand show the movement to bestow boons (varada); the three others hold the elephant goad, the noose and the bowl of sugared rice (pâyasapâtra).
Ḍhuṇḍhi Gaṇapati "The Ganapati Sought After"		dhuMDigaNapatidhyAnaM || mudgalapurANE || akShamAlAM kuThAraM ca | ratnapAtraM svadaMtakaM | dhattE karairviGnarAjO | dhuMDinAmA mudestu naH ||26|| aucityAdraktavarNaH He has four arms. His hands hold the single tusk, the rosary (rudrAkSha), the hatchet (kuthâra) (an axe ) and the pot of jewels (ratnapâtra). (Red Color).
Dvimukha Gaṇapati "Two-faced Ganapati"		atha dvimuKagaNapatidhyAnaM | mudgalapurANE | svadaMtapAshAMkusharatnapAtraM | karairdadhAnO harinIlagAtraH | ratnAMshukO ratnakirITamAlI | bhUtyai sadA bhavatu mE dvimuKO gaNEshaH | hasuruvarNaH He holds in his hands his own tusk, a noose, a hook and a pot full of gems. His body complexion is greenish blue and he is wearing a red colored robe. A gem studded crown embellishes his head.
Trimukha Gaṇapati "Three-faced Ganapati"		atha trimuKagaNapatidhyAnaM | mudgalapurANe | shrUmattIkShNa shiKAMkushAkSha varadAndakShE dadhAnaH karaiH | pAshaMcAmRuta pUrNakuMbhamabhayaM vAmE dadhAnO mudA | pIThE svarNamayAraviMda vilasatsatkarNikA bhAsure | svAsInastrimuKaH palAsharucirO nAgAnanaH pAtu naH | raktavarNa | He has six arms. He carries in two of his right hands very sharp elephant goad, a rudrâksha rosary and is holding another hand in boon bestowing gesture (varada). He carries in two of his left hands a noose, an urn full of celestial nectar (amruta) - ambrosia pot (amritakumbha) and is holding another hand in gesture of bestowing fearlessness (abhaya). He is seated on shining golden throne with lotus in the center. He has three eyes with elephantine face and he effulgent like the flame of forest flower (bastard teak/butea frondosa). (Red color).
Siṃha Gaṇapati "The Lion Ganapati".		atha siMhagaNapatidhyAnaM | mudgalapurANE | vINAM kalpalatAmariM ca varadA dakShE vidhattE karai vAsamE tAmarasaM ca ratnakalashaM sanmaMjarIM cAbhayaM | shuMDAdaMDalasanmRugEMdravadanaM shaMKEMdugaurashshubhO | dIvyadratnanibhAMshukOgaNapatiH pAyadapAyatsa naH ||29|| shvEtavar^NaH He has eight arms. He is white in colour He is holding in his right hands a vîna (Indian lute), a creeper of votive tree - kalpavRukSha (Tree which can cure all diseases), a discus and another held in a gesture of granting boons (varada). He is holding in his left hands a lotus, a pot of gems, a flower bunch and another held in a gesture of granting fearlessness (abahaya). He is lion faced with an elephant trunk and shining. His body is shining like a white conch and moon. He is wearing a gem studded shining robe.
Yoga Gaṇapati "Ganapati the Ascetic".		atha yOgagaNapatidhyAnaM || mudgalapurANe || yOgArUDhO yOgapaTTAbhirAmO| bAlAr^kAbhashcaMdranIlAMshukADhyaH| pAshEkShvakShAnyOgadaMDaMdadhAnaH| pAyAnnityaZM yOgaviGnEshvarOnaH ||30|| raktavarNaH He has four arms. He is red in colour. His legs are surrounded with the meditation girdle (yogapatta). He is engrossed in yoga and is strapped in a yoga posture. He looks beautiful and shines like the rising morning sun. He is adorned with a colored robe which is shining like blue sapphire. His hands hold the rosary, the elbow-rest or the walking-stick (a yoga wand), the noose and the sugar-cane stalk.
Durga Gaṇapati "Ganapati the Invincible" similar the Goddess Durgā.		atha durgAgaNApatidhyAnaM || mudgalapurANE || taptakAMcanasaMkAsha | shcaShTahastOmahattanuH | dIptAMkushaMsharaMcAkShaM | daMttaMdakShEvahankaraiH | vAmEpAshaMkArmukaMca | latAM jaMbUMdadhatkaraiH raktAMshukassadAbhUyA ddurgAgaNapatirmudE ||31|| kanakavarNaH His body glows like burnished gold (Golden Color). He has eight hands and massive body. He is holding a shining hook (Ankush), an Arrow, a rosary and a tusk with the four hands on the right side. He is holding a noose, a bow, a wish bestowing creeper and Rose Apple (Eugenia Jambolana) with the four hands on the left side. He is dressed in red clothes. (According to another version, the Arrow is replaced by a noose)
Saṇkaṭahara Gaṇapati "Ganapati - Dispeller of Troubles".		atha saMkaTaharagaNapatidhyAnaM || mudgalapurANE || bAlArkAruNakAMtirvAmEbAlAMvahannaMkE | lasadiMdIvarahastAM | gaurAMgIM ratnashObhADhyAM | dakShEMkushavaradAnaM | vAmEpAshaMcapAyasaMpAtraM | nIlAMshukalasamAnaH | pIThE padmAruNE tiShThan | saMkaTaharaNaH pAyAtsaMkaTapUgEdgajAnanO nityaM | raktavarNaH He has four arms. He is effulgent like the rising red sun (Red in Color). He has his wife (shakti) - who is carrying a beautiful lotus, glowing with radiance and bejeweled - sitting on his left lap. He is carrying in one of his right hand a hook (Ankusha) and with the other bestowing boon (varada). He is carrying in one of his left hand a rope (noose) and with the other a vessel brimming with sweet soup (Payasam). He is seated on a Red Lotus and wearing a blue robe. (According to another version, the varada gesture and vessel of Payasam is replaced by the broken tusk and the rose-apple fruit.)
