= Ganesha Purana =

Sanskrit text that deals with Ganesha

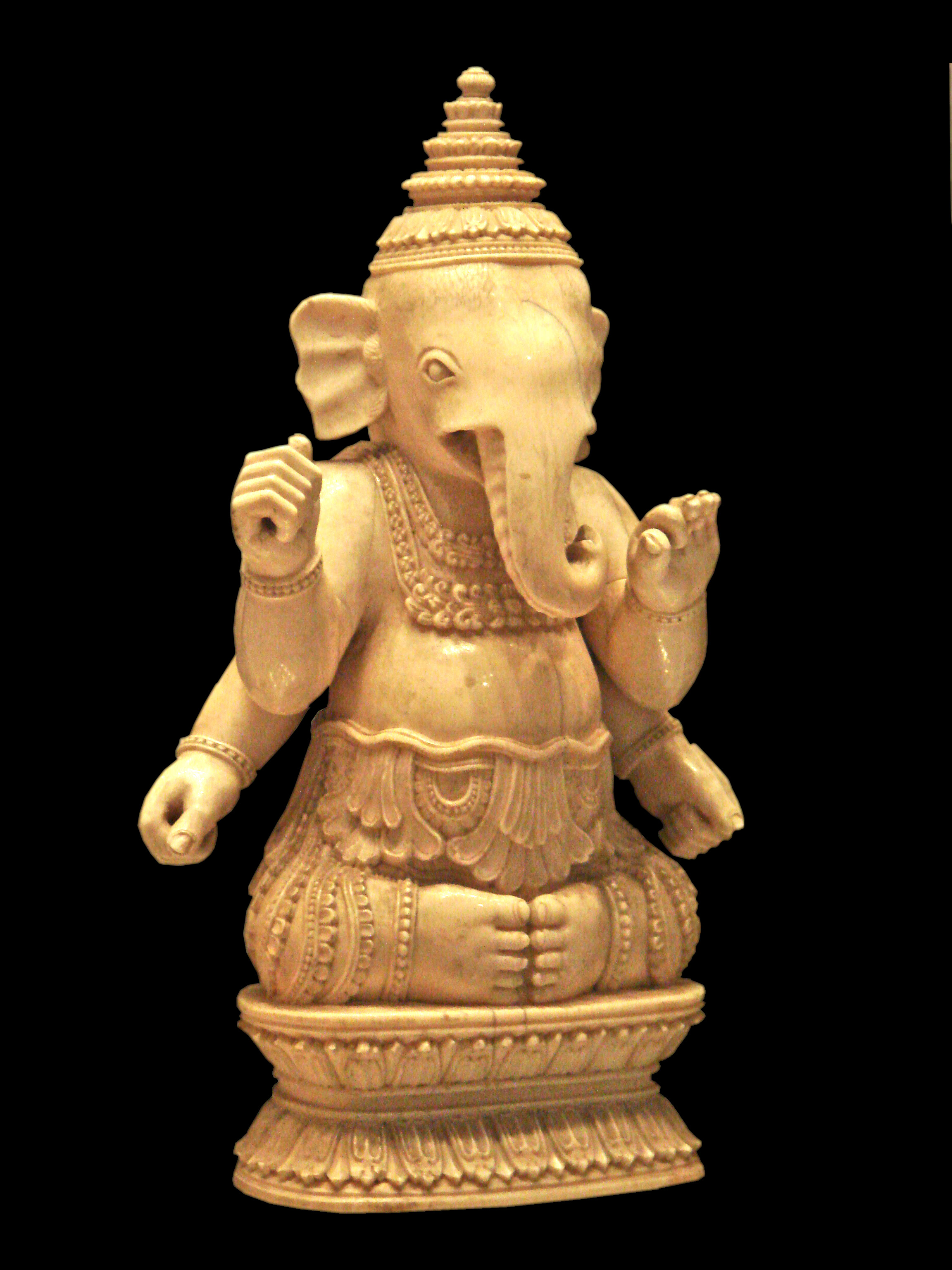
The text presents the mythology and attributes of Hindu deity Ganesha.

The Ganesha Purana (Sanskrit:गणेश पुराणम्; IAST: gaṇeśa purāṇam) is a Sanskrit text that deals with the Hindu deity Ganesha (Gaṇeśa). It is an upapurāṇa (minor Purana) that includes mythology, cosmogony, genealogy, metaphors, yoga, theology and philosophy relating to Ganesha.

The text is organized in two voluminous sections, one on mythology and genealogy (Krida-khanda, 155 chapters), and the other on theology and devotion (Upasana-khanda, 92 chapters). It exists in many versions. The text's composition and expansion date has been estimated to be the late medieval period, between the 13th- to 18th-century CE, during a period of political turmoil during the Islamic rule period of South Asia. The text shares the features and stories found in all major Puranas, and like all Puranas, it is, states Bailey, also a cultural object and reflects the cultural needs and mores, in the environment it was written.

The Ganesha Purana, along with the Mudgala Purana, Brahma Purana and Brahmanda Purana, is one of four Puranic genre encyclopedic texts that deal with Ganesha. The four texts, two Upa-Puranas and two Maha-Puranas, differ in their focus. The Brahmanda Purana presents Ganesha as Saguna (with attributes and physical form), the Brahma Purana presents Ganesha as Nirguna (without attributes, abstract principle), Ganesha Purana presents him as a union of Saguna and Nirguna concept wherein saguna Ganesha is a prelude to nirguna Ganesha, and the Mudgala Purana describes Ganesha as Samyoga (abstract synthesis with absolute reality and soul).

The Ganesha Purana is an important text particularly for Ganapatyas (Gāṇapatya), who consider Ganesha as their primary deity.

== Significance ==
The Ganesha Purana is significant because it is, with Ganapati Upanishad, the two most important texts of the Ganapatya sect of Hinduism. The Ganapatyas consider Ganesha as their primary deity, and the mythology of Ganesha found in this Purana is part of their tradition. The text is also significant because it relates to Ganesha, who is the most worshipped god in Hinduism, and revered as the god of beginnings by all major Hindu traditions, namely Shaivism, Vaishnavism, Shaktism and Smartism. The text integrates ancient mythology and Vedantic premises into a Ganesha bhakti (devotional) framework.

The text is also significant to the history of Buddhism and Jainism, since Ganesha is found in their mythologies and theology as well.

== Date of work ==
The Ganesha Purana and the Mudgala Purana are the two late Puranas (c. AD 1300–1600). Stietencron suggests the more likely period of composition may be 15th- to 18th-century, during a period of conflict between the Hindu Maratha and Islamic Sultanates in Maharashtra.

The date of composition for both the Ganesha Purana and the Mudgala Purana, and their dating relative to one another, has been a matter of academic debate. Both works contain age-layered strata, but these strata have not been clearly defined through the process of critical editorship. Some strata of the available redactions of the Ganesha Purana and the Mudgala Purana probably reflect mutual influence upon one another, including direct references to one another.

Thapan reviews different views on dating and states her own judgement that it appears likely that the core of the Ganesha Purana come into existence around the 12th and 13th centuries, being subject to interpolations during the succeeding ages. Thapan notes that these Puranas, like other Puranas, developed over a period of time as multi-layered works.

Lawrence W. Preston considers that the period AD 1100–1400 is the most reasonable date for the Ganesha Purana because that period agrees with the apparent age of the sacred sites in Nagpur and Varanasi areas mentioned by it. Hazra also dates the Ganesha Purana between AD 1100–1400. Farquhar dates it between AD 900–1350. Stevenson, in contrast, suggests the text was likely written in or after 17th-century.

== Structure ==
Virtuous kings

These virtuous and gentle kings,
seek neither to reproach others,
nor do they seek the wives of others,
nor the injury of others,
nor the property of others.

— Ganesha Purana, The Tale of Chandrangada
Upasana Khanda, 54.25 - 54.26
(Translator: Greg Bailey)

The Ganesa Purana is divided into two sections. The Upasanakhanda (upāsanākhaṇḍa) or "section on devotion" has 92 chapters, and the Kridakhanda (krīḍākhaṇḍa) or "section on the divine play (of Gaṇeśa)" has 155 chapters. The Kridakhanda is also called the Uttarakhanda (uttarakhaṇḍa) in the colophons. Chapter 46 of the Upasanakhanda includes a stotra (hymn) that is the source text for one of the best-known versions of the Ganesha Sahasranama (hymn of praise listing 1,000 names and attributes of Ganesha).

The text has five literary units, found in all Puranas: khanda, mahatmya, upakhyana, gita and a narrative unit. It is structured as a recitation by sage Vyasa, traceable to sages in the mythical Naimisa forest in Hinduism. The composition style is didactic and mythic, the imagery and framing of story is similar to the other Puranas. The text has four idiosyncrasies, states Bailey, in that it contains no pancalaksana content, minimal didactic presentation of dharmashastra, the myths are structured as involving Ganesha's intervention in ancient Hindu mythology, and the mythical plots invariably present Ganesha as the life and inner principle of all other Hindu deities.

== Contents ==
=== Upasanakhanda: Abstract meditation or Bhakti Puja ===
The Upasanakhanda, or the first part of the Ganesha Purana, presents two modes of worship. One is meditation and mystic contemplation of Ganesha as the eternal Brahman presented in Vedanta school of Hindu philosophy, the metaphysical absolute and Paramatma (Nirguna, supreme spirit), where he is same as the Atman (soul, innermost self) within oneself. The second approach, suggests the Ganesapurana, is through preparing an image of god (Saguna, murti), decorating it with flowers, presenting it offerings and festively remembering him in Puja-style homage. The Upasanakhanda presents these ideas in a series of episodical stories and cosmogony, that weaves in ancient mythologies as dynamic empirical reality and presents Ganesha as the Vedantist Brahman, or the absolute unchanging reality.

=== Kridakhanda: The Ganesha Gita ===
Chapters 138-48 of the Kridakhanda constitute the Ganesha Gita, which is modeled on the Bhagavad Gita, but adapted to place Ganesha in the divine role. The discourse is given to King Varenya during Ganesha's incarnation as Gajanana.

Know your soul

Ganesha said, "The man who delights in his own self and is attached to his own self, attains bliss and indestructible happiness, for there is no happiness in the senses. Enjoyments which arise from the objects of the senses are the causes of pain and are connected to birth and destruction. The wise man is not attached to them. (...)

Grounded within the soul, shining within the soul, happy with the soul, he who delights in the soul, will certainly gain the imperishable Brahman and bring about the good aims of all people. (...)

Mark! For all those who know their own self, Brahman shines everywhere. (...)

— Ganesha Purana, Krida Khanda, 142.21 - 142.26
(Translator: Greg Bailey)

According to Yuvraj Krishan, the Ganesha Gita shows that ninety percent of its stanzas are, with slight modifications, taken from the Bhagavad Gita. Their topics are the same: karma yoga, jnana yoga and bhakti yoga. However, Ganesha replaces Krishna in the divine role, states Yuvraj Krishan.

In contrast, Greg Bailey states that while Bhagavad Gita is a strong possible source, the Ganesha Gita has only 412 verses in this section and skips a large number of verses in Bhagavad Gita, and it is incorrect to presume that the text is identical in all respects and merely replaces Ganesha for Krishna. The discussion develops differently, and the character of Varenya is far weaker than the inquisitive philosophical questions of Arjuna in the Bhagavad Gita, as Varenya asks questions of Ganesha. However, agrees Bailey, that the theology found in Bhagavad Gita and Ganesha Gita are substantially the same.

=== Kridakhanda: Ganesha in four Yugas ===
The Kridakhanda of the Ganesha Purana narrates the stories of four incarnations (Avatars) of Ganesha, each for the four different yugas. The 155 chapters of this section are separated into the four yugas. Chapters 1 through 72 present Ganesha in Satya Yuga, chapters 73 through 126 present Ganesha's story in the Treta Yuga, while chapters 127 through 137 present his stories in Dvapara Yuga. Chapter 138 through 148 present the Ganesha Gita, followed by a short section on Kali Yuga (current age) in chapter 149. The rest of chapter 149 through chapter 155 are interlocutory, following the literary requirements of a valid Puranic genre.

Ganesha is presented as Vinayaka in Satya Yuga, with ten arms, huge, very generous in giving gifts and riding a lion. In Treta Yuga, Ganesha is in the form of Mayuresvara (Mayūreśvara), who has six arms, with a white complexion, and rides a peacock. He manifests in the form of Gajanana (Gajānana) in Dvapara Yuga, with four arms, a red complexion and riding Dinka, a mouse. He is born to Shiva and Parvati in the Dvapara Yuga. In the Kali Yuga, he is Dhumraketu (Dhūmraketu), with two arms, of smoke complexion, mounted on a horse. He fights barbarian armies and kills demons in the Kali Yuga, according to Ganesha Purana.

== Manuscripts ==
Greg M. Bailey, who has published a scholarly review and translation into English of the first portion (upāsanākhaṇḍa) of the Ganesha Purana, notes that there are hundreds of manuscripts for this Purana in libraries in India, and that it was clearly very popular from the 17th to 19th centuries.

An edition of the Ganesha Purana was published in two parts by Sri Balvinayak Maharaj Lalsare (head of Śrī Yogīndra Maṭha) at Moregaon, Maharashtra (the site of one of the aṣṭavināyaka temples). The Upasanakhanda (upāsanākhaṇḍa) was published in 1979 and the Kridakhanda (krīḍākhaṇḍa) was published in 1985. This is the edition that Thapan cites in her book on the development of the Ganapatyas (Gāṇapatya).

The Ganesha Purana was published three times before the edition of the Śrī Yogīndra Maṭha:

- Pune, 1876
- Bombay, 1876
- Bombay, 1892, Gopal Narayana and Co.

The Ganesha Purana was translated into Tamil in the 18th century and the Tamil version is referred to as the Vināyaka Purāṇa.

== See also ==
- Thirty-two forms of Ganesha – 32 forms of Hindu god Ganesha

== Bibliography ==
- Bailey, Greg (1995). Ganeśapurāna: Introduction, translation, notes and index. Berlin: Otto Harrassowitz Verlag. ISBN 3-447-03647-8.
- Bailey, Greg (2008). Gaṇeśapurāṇa: Krīḍākhaṇḍa. Otto Harrassowitz Verlag. ISBN 978-3-447-05472-0.
- Brown, Robert L. (1991). Ganesh: Studies of an Asian God. Albany: State University of New York. ISBN 978-0-7914-0657-1.
- Courtright, Paul B. (1985). Gaṇeśa: Lord of Obstacles, Lord of Beginnings. New York: Oxford University Press. ISBN 978-0-19-505742-3.
- Grimes, John A. (1995). Ganapati: Song of the Self. SUNY Series in Religious Studies. Albany: State University of New York Press. ISBN 978-0-7914-2440-7.
- Krishan, Yuvraj (1999). Gaņeśa: Unravelling An Enigma. Delhi: Motilal Banarsidass Publishers. ISBN 978-81-208-1413-4.
- Rocher, Ludo (1986). The Purāṇas. Otto Harrassowitz Verlag. ISBN 978-3447025225.
- Mani, Vettam (2006) [1975]. Puranic Encyclopaedia: A Comprehensive Dictionary With Special Reference to the Epic and Puranic Literature (1st English ed.). New Delhi: Motilal Banarsidass. ISBN 978-81-208-0597-2.
- Sharma, Ram Karan, ed. (1993). Gaṇeśa purāṇa. Delhi: Nag Publishers. ISBN 978-81-7081-279-1.
- Thapan, Anita Raina (1997). Understanding Gaņapati: Insights into the Dynamics of a Cult. New Delhi: Manohar Publishers. ISBN 978-81-7304-195-2.
