= Mudgala Purana =

Minor Purana of Hinduism

The Mudgala Purana (Sanskrit:मुद्गल पुराणम्; mudgala purāṇam) is a Hindu religious text dedicated to the Hindu deity Ganesha (Gaṇeśa). It is an upapurāṇa that includes many stories and ritualistic elements relating to Ganesha. The Ganesha Purana and the Mudgala Purana are core scriptures for devotees of Ganesha, known as Ganapatyas (Gāṇapatya). These are the only two Purana that are exclusively dedicated to Ganesha.

== Content ==
Like the Ganesha Purana, the Mudgala Purana considers Ganesha to represent the ultimate reality of being. As such, Ganesha's manifestations are endless but eight of his incarnations (Sanskrit:अवतार; avatāra) are of most importance. The eight incarnations are introduced in MudP 1.17.24-28. The text is organized into sections for each of these incarnations. These are not the same as the four incarnations of Ganesha that are described in the Ganesha Purana.

=== Eight incarnations of Ganesha ===
The incarnation described in the Mudgala Purana took place in different cosmic ages. The Mudgala Purana uses these incarnations to express complex philosophical concepts associated with the progressive creation of the world. Each incarnation represents a stage of the absolute as it unfolds into creation. Granoff provides a summary of the philosophical meaning of each incarnation within the framework of the Mudgala Purana; along with the philosophy, typical Puranic themes of battles with demons provide much of the story line. The incarnations appear in the following order:

1. Vakratunda (Vakratuṇḍa) ("twisting trunk"), first in the series, represents the absolute as the aggregate of all bodies, an embodiment of the form of Brahman. The purpose of this incarnation is to overcome the demon Matsaryāsura (envy, jealousy). His mount (vāhana) is a lion.
2. Ekadanta ("single tusk") represents the aggregate of all individual souls, an embodiment of the essential nature of Brahman. the purpose of this incarnation is to overcome the demon Madāsura (arrogance, conceit). His mount is a mouse.
3. Mahodara ("big belly") is a synthesis of both Vakratuṇḍa and Ekadanta. It is the absolute as it enters into the creative process. It is an embodiment of the wisdom of Brahman. The purpose of this incarnation is to overcome the demon Mohāsura (delusion, confusion). His mount is a mouse.
4. Gajavaktra (or Gajānana) ("elephant face") is a counterpart to Mahodara. The purpose of this incarnation is to overcome the demon Lobhāsura (greed). His mount is a mouse.
5. Lambodara ("pendulous belly") is the first of four incarnations that correspond to the stage where the Purāṇic gods are created. Lambodara corresponds to Śakti, the pure power of Brahman. The purpose of this incarnation is to overcome the demon Krodhāsura (anger). His mount is a mouse.
6. Vikata (Vikaṭa) ("unusual form", "misshapen") corresponds to Sūrya. He is an embodiment of the illuminating nature of Brahman. The purpose of this incarnation is to overcome the demon Kāmāsura (lust). His mount is a peacock.
7. Vighnaraja (Vighnarāja) ("king of obstacles"), corresponds to Viṣṇu. He is an embodiment of the preserving nature of Brahman. The purpose of this incarnation is to overcome the demon Mamāsura (possessiveness). His mount is the celestial serpent Shesha.
8. Dhumravarna (Dhūmravarṇa) ("grey color") corresponds to Shiva. He is an embodiment of the destructive nature of Brahman. The purpose of this incarnation is to overcome the demon Abhimanāsura or ahamkarasura (pride, attachment). His mount is a blue horse. He is a very angry form of Ganesha. It is said that in future he will help Kalki(Vishnu's last avatar) to start Mahayuga.

== History ==
=== Dating ===
There is little agreement on the date of the Mudgala Purana. Phyllis Granoff reviews the internal evidence and concludes that the Mudgala was the last of the philosophical texts concerned with Ganesha R. C. Hazra suggested that the Mudgala Purana is earlier than the Ganesha Purana which he dates between 1100 and 1400 A.D. Granoff finds problems with this relative dating because the Mudgala Purana specifically mentions the Ganesha Purana as one of the four Puranas that deal at length with Ganesha. These are the Brahma, the Brahmaṇḍa, the Ganesha, and the Mudgala puranas. Courtright, says that the Mudgala Purana dates from the fourteenth to sixteenth centuries but he gives no reason for this. Thapan (pp. 30–33) reviews different views on the relative dating of these two works and notes that the Mudgala Purana, like other Puranas, is a multi-laid work. She says that the kernel of the text must be old and that it must have continued to receive interpolations until the 17th and 18th centuries as the worship of Ganapati became more important in certain regions.

=== Published editions ===
As of 2007 no "critical edition" had been issued for the Mudgala Purana. A "critical edition" of a Purana is a special type of scholarly edition in which many alternative readings from variant manuscripts have been reviewed and reconciled by scholars to produce a consensus text. If there is no critical edition, it means that individual editions may show significant variations in content and line numbering from one another. This is the case with the Mudgala Purana, so it is necessary to review multiple editions, which may differ from one another in significant ways. The most common edition currently available is Mudgala Purana (both Sanskrit and Prakrut versions) written by Sitaram Desai and published by Mudgala Puran Prakashan Mandal, Dadar, Mumbai. The Sanskrit edition is also available and published by Ganeshyogi Maharaj of Kempwad, Karnataka.
