= Pasha (Hinduism) =

Hindu supernatural weapon

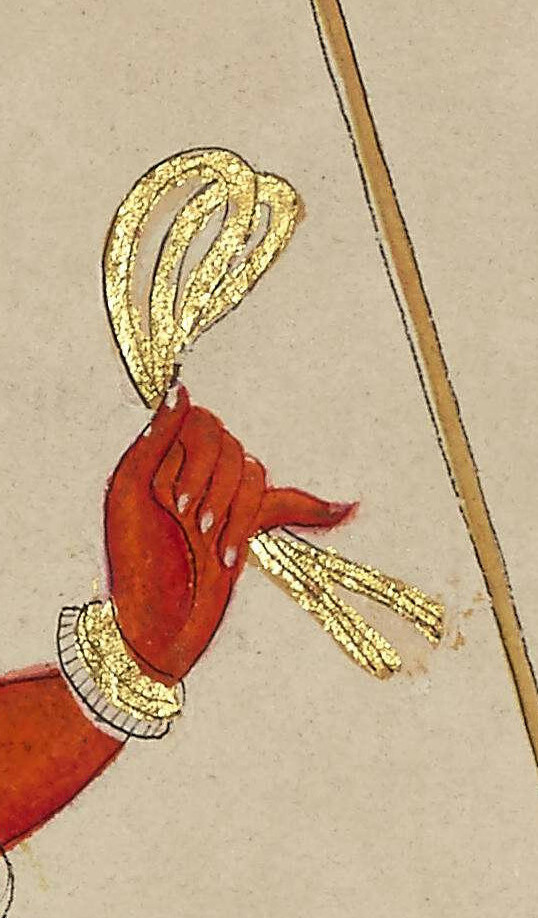
Pasha as a noose in the hands of Ganesha

A pasha (Sanskrit: पाश, romanized: pāśa, lit. 'noose, lasso') is a supernatural weapon depicted in Hindu iconography. Hindu deities such as Ganesha, Yama, Shyamala devi, and Varuna are depicted with the pasha in their hands.

Pasha is a common attribute of Ganesha, the Lord of removing obstacles; a pasha represents his power to bind and free obstacles. Yama, the god of death, uses the Pasha to extract a soul from a being's body at the time of death. In sculpture, it is depicted as two or three bound into one or a double loop.

The Sanskrit word "pasha" originally meant "knot" or "loop". In general usage, the pasha is used to bind a foe's arms and legs or for hunting animals. Pasha represents worldly attachment as well as power of a deity to capture and bind evil and ignorance. Ananda Coomaraswamy explores the connection of pasha to worldly bonds.

In the Shaiva Siddhanta school of Hinduism, pasha is part of the trinity Pati-pashu-pasha, meaning "Master, animal, tether", symbolizing God, man and world. Pati is God as Shiva, the patron god of the sect. Pashu is the soul or man. Pasha is the power by which Shiva leads souls to the Truth or the power of his maya (illusion) by which he entices "unenlightened" beings.

== Illustrations ==
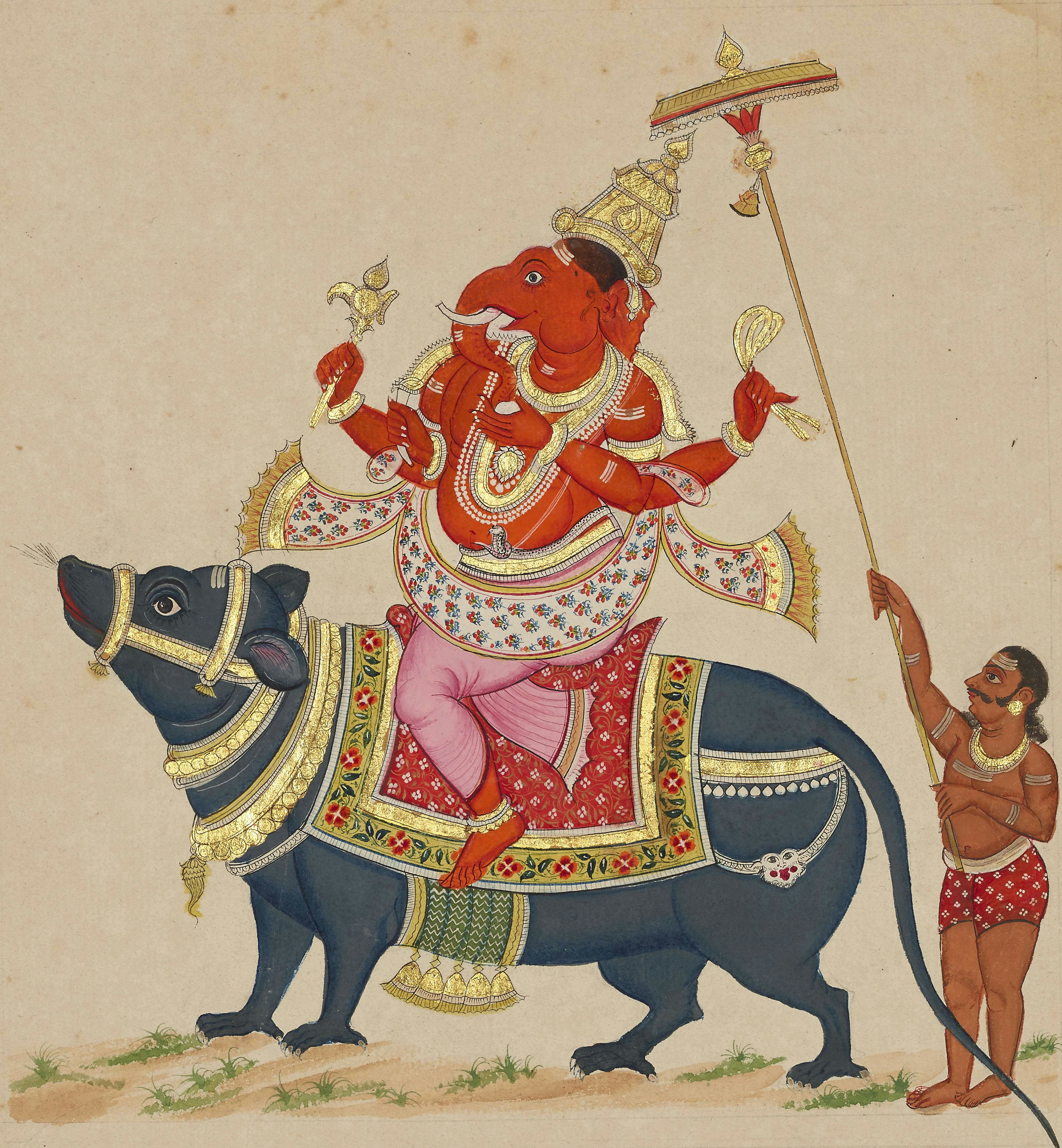
Ganesha

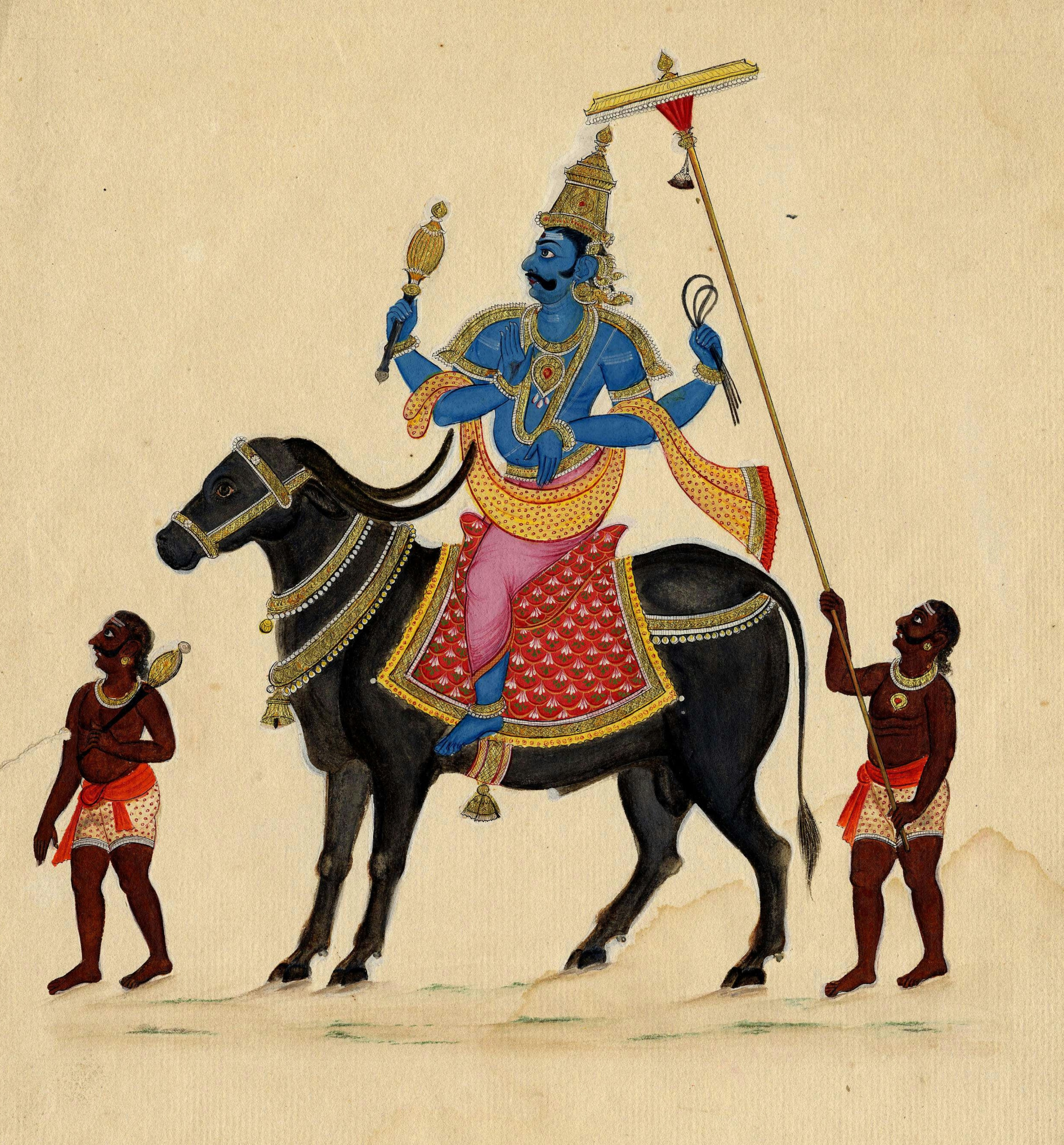
Yama

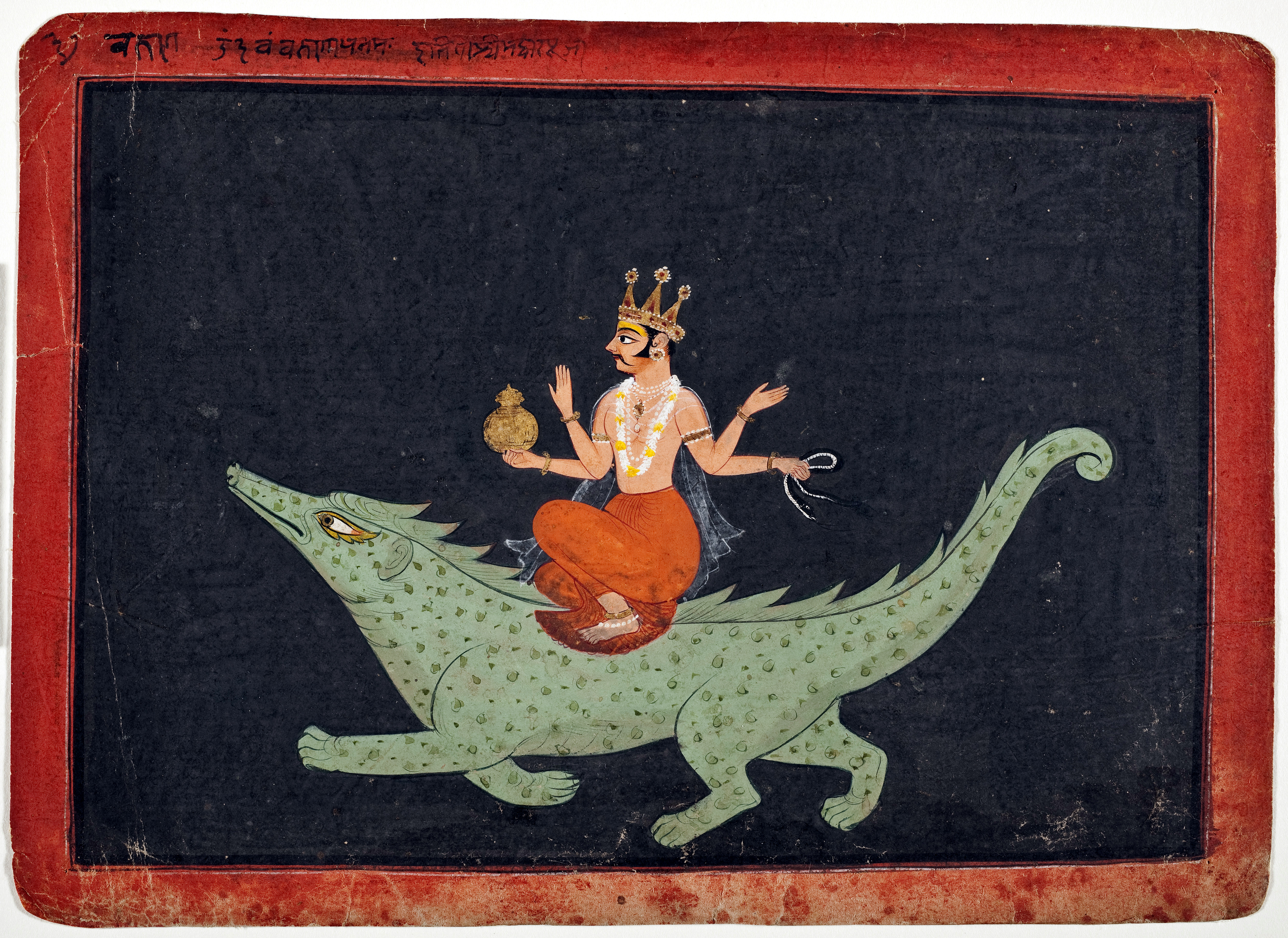
Varuna holding a pasha in the form of a snake
