= Ganapatya =

Denomination of Hinduism that worships Ganesha

Ganapatya is a denomination of Hinduism that worships Ganesha (also called Ganapati) as the Parabrahman, Saguna Brahman.

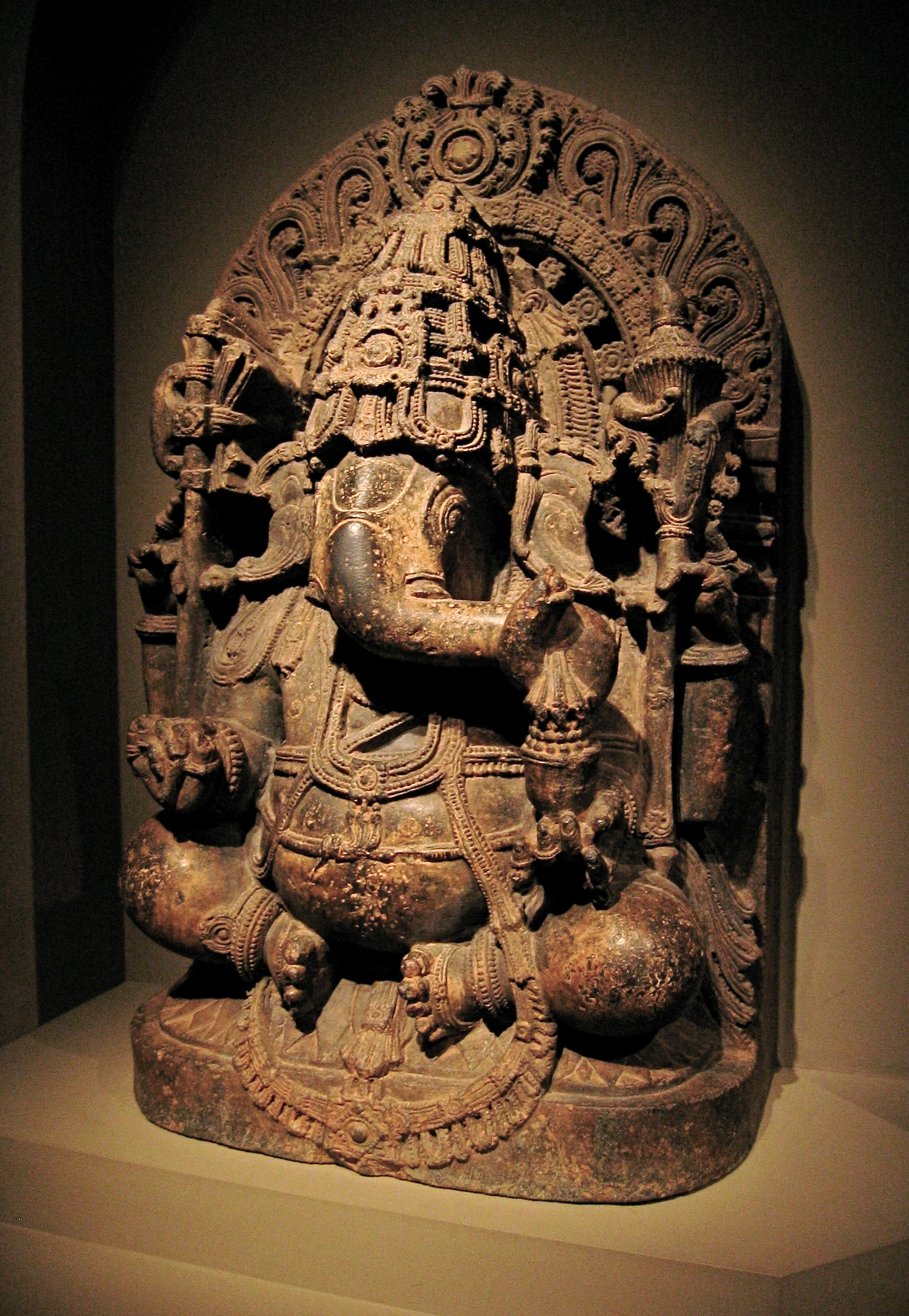
A 13th-century statue of Ganesha, Hoysala-style, Karnataka

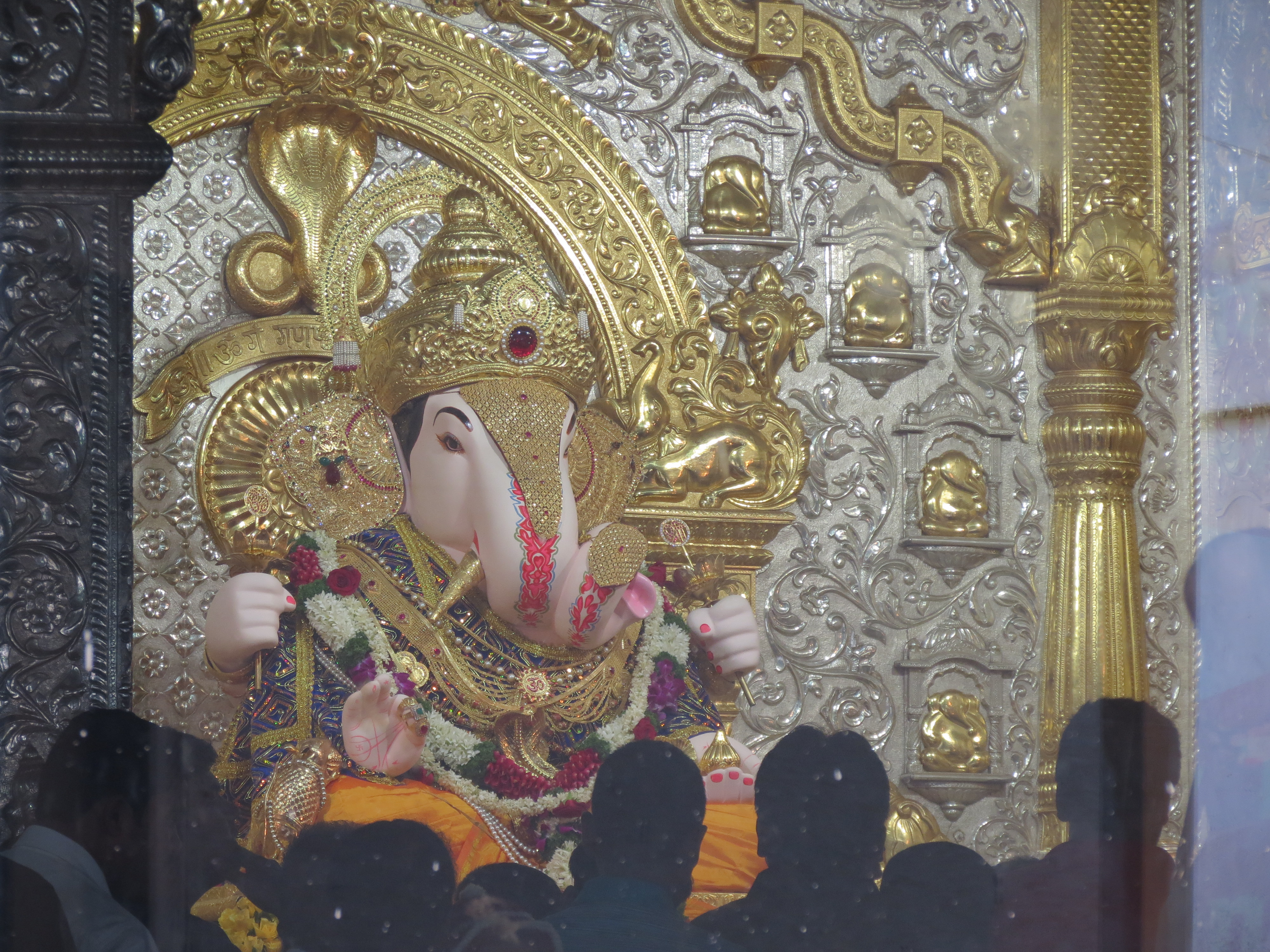
The central icon of Ganesha at the Dagadusheth Halwai Ganapati temple.

== Beliefs ==
The worship of Ganesha is considered complementary with the worship of other deities. Hindus of all sects begin prayers, important undertakings, and religious ceremonies with an invocation of Ganesha, because of Ganesha's role as the god of beginnings. But although most Hindu sects do revere Ganesha, the Ganapatya sect goes further than that, and declares Ganesha to be the supreme being. Ganapatya is one of the six principal Hindu sects which focus on a particular deity, alongside Shaivism, focused on Shiva; Shaktism, focused on Shakti; Vaishnavism, focused on Vishnu; Indraism, focused on Indra; and Saura, focused on Surya. While Ganapatya is not as large a sect as the other five, it still has been influential. There is also the Smartism sect, which follows Advaita philosophy and practices the "worship of the five forms" (pañcāyatana pūjā) system, popularized by Śaṅkarācārya. In this system, the five deities Ganesha, Vishnu, Shiva, Devī, and Sūrya are viewed as five equal forms of one Nirguna Brahman.

== History ==
Ganapati has been worshipped as part of Shaivism since at least the fifth century. A specific Ganapatya sect probably began to appear between the sixth and ninth centuries: six sects are mentioned in the Sankara digvijaya (life of Adi Shankara) by Anandigiri. It reached a high point about the tenth century, and built temples dedicated to Ganesha, the largest of which is the Ucchi Pillayar Koil (the Columns Hall of a Thousand Pillars), on the Rock Fort of Tiruchirappalli in Tamil Nadu. Ganesha is worshipped as the Supreme Being (Para Brahman) in this sect. Being the chief deity in this form of Hinduism, he is known by the epithet Parameshwara (Supreme God), which is normally reserved for Shiva.

=== Moraya Gosavi ===
Later, the sect was popularized by Morya Gosavi. According to one source, he found an idol of Ganapati not made by human hands, and built the Moragao temple near Pune in the 14th century. According to another, he experienced visions of Ganapati at the Morgaon shrine, and was entombed alive (Sanjeevan samadhi) in 1651, in a Ganesha temple at his birthplace in Chinchwad.

Following him, the Ganapatya sect became prominent between the seventeenth and nineteenth centuries in Maharashtra in south western India, centering on Cinchwad. Its centre is still among Hindus in the Marathi-speaking Maharashtra, and it is important in the rest of South India. Devotees hold an annual pilgrimage between Chinchwad and Moragao.

Sect marks include a red circle on the forehead, or the brands of an elephant face and tusk on the shoulders.

== Scriptures ==
In the Ganapatya tradition founded in the Ganesha Purana and the Mudgala Purana, Ganesha is worshipped as one of the five principle deities along with Siva, Vishnu, the Sun, and the Goddess.

The date of composition for the Ganesha Purana and the Mudgala Purana—and their dating relative to one another—has sparked academic debate. Both works were developed over time and contain age-layered strata. Anita Thapan reviews comment about dating and provide her own judgment. "It seems likely that the core of the Ganesha Purana appeared around the twelfth and thirteenth centuries", she says, "but was later interpolated." Lawrence W. Preston considers the most reasonable date for the Ganesha Purana to be between 1100 and 1400, which coincides with the apparent age of the sacred sites mentioned by the text.

R.C. Hazra suggests that the Mudgala Purana is older than the Ganesha Purana, which he dates between 1100 and 1400. However, Phyllis Granoff finds problems with this relative dating and concludes that the Mudgala Purana was the last of the philosophical texts concerned with Ganesha. She bases her reasoning on the fact that, among other internal evidence, the Mudgala Purana specifically mentions the Ganesha Purana as one of the four Puranas (the Brahma, the Brahmanda, the Ganesha, and the Mudgala Puranas) which deal at length with Ganesha. While the kernel of the text must be old, it was interpolated until the 17th and 18th centuries as the worship of Ganapati became more important in certain regions. Another highly regarded scripture in the Ganapatya tradition, the Sanskrit Ganapati Atharvashirsa, was probably composed during the 16th or 17th century.

The Ganesha Sahasranama is part of the Puranic literature, and is a litany of a thousand names and attributes of Ganesha. Each name in the sahasranama conveys a different meaning and symbolises a different aspect of Ganesha. Versions of the Ganesha Sahasranama are found in the Ganesha Purana.

== See also ==
- Herambasuta
- Mahaganapati
- Thirty-two forms of Ganesha
- Ganesh Chaturthi – Hindu religious festival
