= Mushaka =

Mount of the Hindu god Ganesha

- A statue of Mushaka at Karuppur
- Other names: Mushika, Akhu, Krauncha
- Sanskrit transliteration: Mūṣaka
- Abode: Mount Kailash

Mushaka (Sanskrit: मूषक, Mūṣaka), also spelled Mushika, is the mouse or rat that serves as the vahana (mount) of the Hindu god Ganesha. Ganesha is commonly depicted riding on Mushaka or with it near his feet.

== As vahana ==
Ganesha is often shown riding on or attended by a mouse. Martin-Dubost says that the rat began to appear as the principal vehicle in sculptures of Ganesha in central and western India during the 7th century; the rat was always placed close to his feet. The mouse as a mount first appears in written sources in the Matsya Purana and later in the Brahmananda Purana and Ganesha Purana, where Ganesha uses it as his vehicle in his last incarnation. The Ganapati Atharvashirsa includes a meditation verse on Ganesha that describes the mouse appearing on his flag. The names Mūṣakavāhana (mouse-mount) and Ākhuketana (rat-banner) appear in the Ganesha Sahasranama.

== Mythology ==
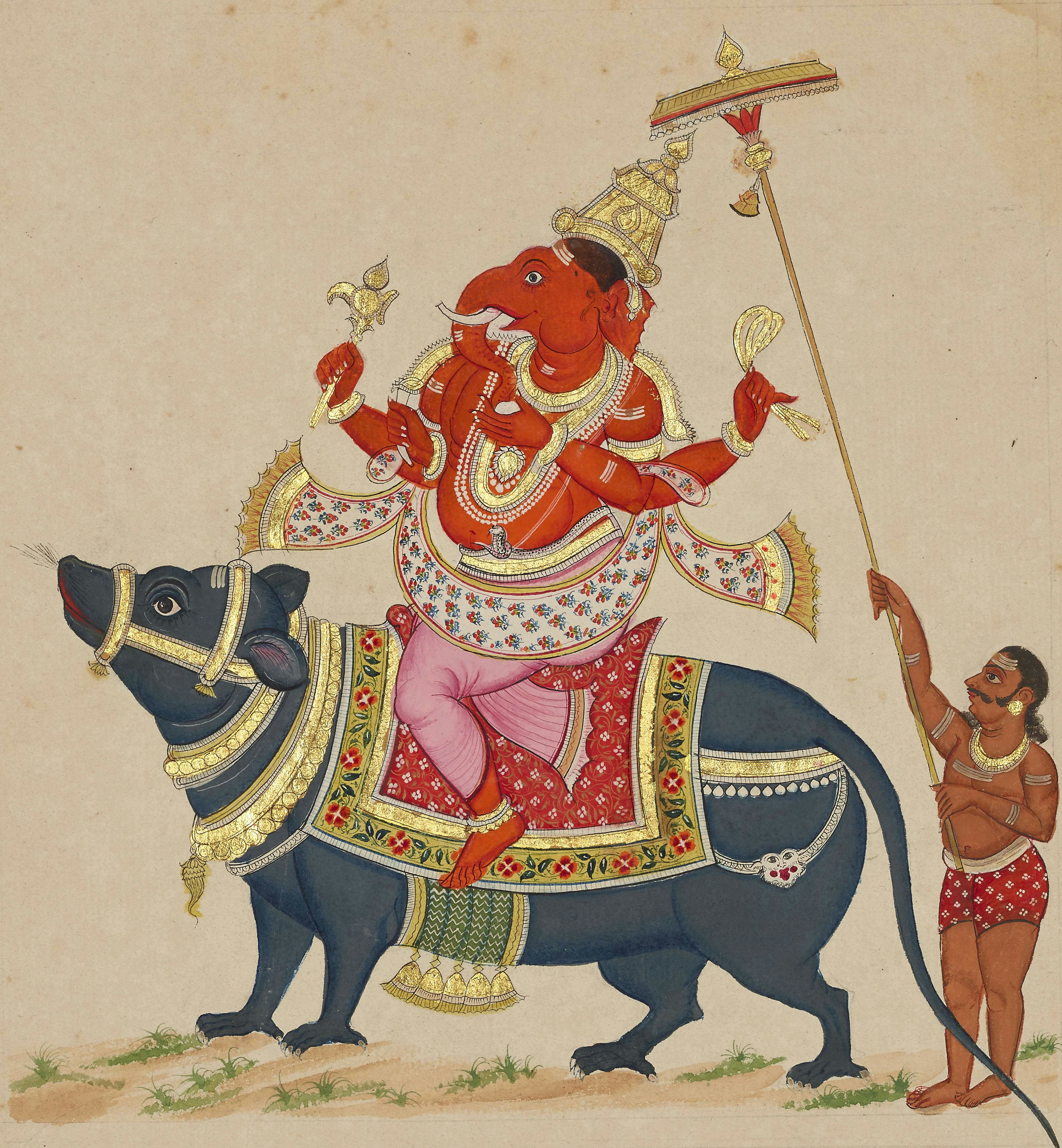
Ganesha on his vahana mūṣaka the rat, c. 1820

According to one traditional account, Mooshika was originally a gandharva (heavenly musician) named Krauncha. He accidentally stepped on the foot of the sage Vamadeva, who cursed him to become a giant rat. The rat later caused damage to fields and hermitages. When it entered the ashram of the sage Parashara, the sage called on Ganesha for help. Ganesha caught the rat with his pasha (noose). The rat then surrendered to Ganesha and asked to serve him. Ganesha accepted and made the rat his vahana (vehicle). The rat was concerned that it could not carry Ganesha because of his weight. Ganesha then reduced his weight so that the rat could carry him.

Another tradition identifies the mouse with Mushikasura, a demon who fought Ganesha. After being defeated, Mushikasura became Ganesha's vehicle.

According to a South Indian tradition, an elephant-faced demon named Gajamukhāsura fought Ganesha. During their fight, Gajamukhāsura broke one of Ganesha's tusks. Ganesha picked up the broken tusk and threw it at the demon, transforming him into a rat. Ganesha then took the rat as his vahana (vehicle).

Another version tells of a rat that is attracted by the smell of a modaka, a sweet associated with Ganesha. The rat comes out of its hole and takes some of the food. It then becomes immortal and becomes Ganesha's vehicle.

== Interpretations ==
Statue of Mushaka at the Ganesha shrine, Chiang Mai

The mouse is interpreted in several ways. According to Grimes, "Many, if not most of those who interpret Gaṇapati's mouse, do so negatively; it symbolizes tamoguṇa as well as desire". Along these lines, Michael Wilcockson says it symbolises those who wish to overcome desires and be less selfish.

Krishan notes that the rat is destructive and a menace to crops. The Sanskrit word mūṣaka (mouse) is derived from the root mūṣ (stealing, robbing). It was essential to subdue the rat as a destructive pest, a type of vighna (impediment) that needed to be overcome. According to this theory, showing Ganesha as master of the rat demonstrates his function as Vigneshvara (Lord of Obstacles) and gives evidence of his possible role as a folk grāma-devatā (village deity) who later rose to greater prominence.

Martin-Dubost notes a view that the rat is a symbol suggesting that Ganesha, like the rat, penetrates even the most secret places. Getty also notes that the rat has been interpreted as a symbol of the night and as a priapic animal.

== Worship ==
At some Ganesha temples, devotees whisper their wishes into the ear of a statue of Mushaka. They believe that Mushaka forwards their wishes to Ganesha. A similar practice is reported at the Huai Khwang Ganesha Shrine in Bangkok.

== Bibliography ==
- Brown, Robert (1991), Ganesh: Studies of an Asian God, Albany: State University of New York, ISBN 978-0791406571
- Grimes, John A. (1995), Ganapati: Song of the Self, SUNY Series in Religious Studies, Albany: State University of New York Press, ISBN 978-0791424407
- Krishan, Yuvraj (1999), Gaṇeśa: Unravelling An Enigma, Delhi: Motilal Banarsidass Publishers, ISBN 978-8120814134
- Martin-Dubost, Paul (1965), Gaṇeśa, the Enchanter of the Three Worlds, the University of Michigan: Franco-Indian Research, ISBN 9788190018432
- Martin-Dubost, Paul (1997). Gaṇeśa, the Enchanter of the Three Worlds. Franco-Indian Research. pp. 412–416. ISBN 978-81-900184-3-2.
- Nagar, Shanti Lal (1992). The Cult of Vinayaka. New Delhi: Intellectual Publishing House. ISBN 978-81-7076-044-3.
