= Ganesha =

Hindu god of new beginnings, wisdom and luck

- God of New Beginnings, Wisdom and Luck; Remover of Obstacles; The Supreme Being (Ganapatya)
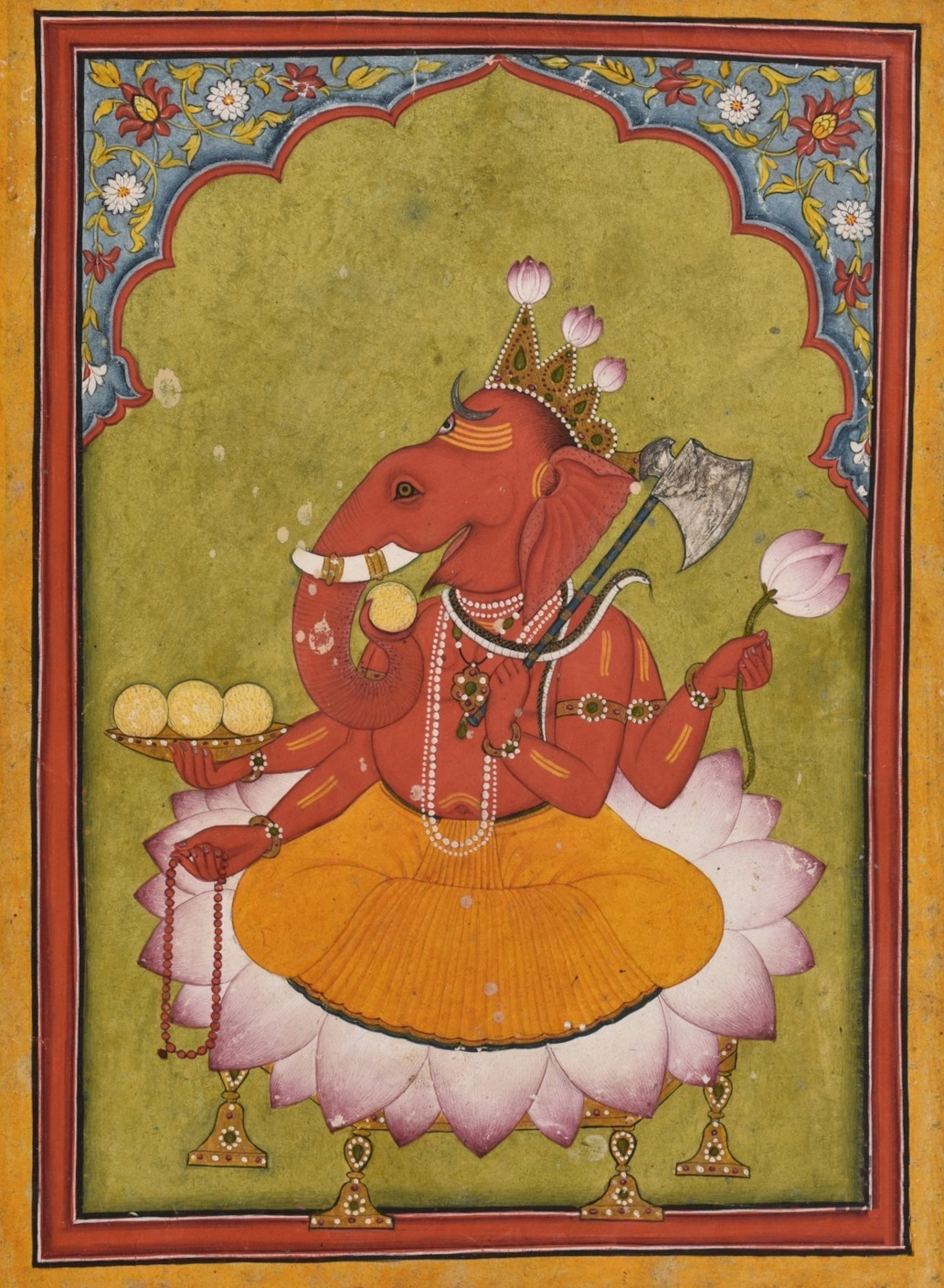
- Basohli miniature, c. 1730. National Museum, New Delhi
- Abode: Kailasha (with parents)
- Mantra: Oṃ Śrī Gaṇeśāya Namaḥ; Oṃ Gaṃ Gaṇapataye Namaḥ
- Weapon: Paraśu (axe); pāśa; aṅkuśa (elephant goad)
- Symbols: Om; Modak
- Day: Tuesday and Wednesday
- Mount: Mushaka
- Texts: Ganesha Purana; Mudgala Purana; Ganapati Atharvashirsa
- Gender: Male
- Temple: Ashtavinayaka Temples, Maharashtra
- Festivals: Ganesh Chaturthi; Ganesh Jayanti; Sankashti Chaturthi

Genealogy
- Parents: Shiva (father); Parvati (mother)
- Siblings: Kartikeya (brother)
- Consort: Buddhi, Riddhi and Siddhi or celibate in some traditions
- Children: Shubha/Ksema and Labha (Sons)

Equivalents
- Japanese Buddhist: Kangiten

Ganesha, or Ganesh (Sanskrit: गणेश, IAST: Gaṇeśa, IPA: [ɡɐˈɳeːɕɐ]), also known as Ganapati, Vinayaka and Pillaiyar, is one of the best-known and most revered and worshipped deities in the Hindu pantheon and is the Supreme god in the Ganapatya sect. His depictions are found throughout India. Hindu denominations worship him regardless of affiliations. Ganesha also holds the Title of "Pratham Pujya" (the god to be worshipped initially before the worship of any other Deity). Devotion to Ganesha is widely diffused and extends to Jains and Buddhists and beyond India.

Although Ganesha has many attributes, he is readily identified by his elephant head and four arms. He is widely revered, more specifically, as the remover of obstacles and bringer of good luck; the patron of arts and sciences; and the deva of logic, intellect, and wisdom. As the god of beginnings, he is honoured at the start of rites and ceremonies. Ganesha is also invoked during writing sessions as a patron of letters and learning. Several texts relate anecdotes associated with his birth and exploits.

Ganesha is mentioned in Hindu texts between the 1st century BCE and 2nd century CE, and a few Ganesha images from the 4th and 5th centuries CE have been documented by scholars. Hindu texts identify him as the son of Parvati and Shiva of the Shaivism tradition, but he is a pan-Hindu god found in its various traditions. In the Ganapatya tradition of Hinduism, Ganesha is the Supreme Being. The principal texts on Ganesha include the Ganesha Purana, the Mudgala Purana, and the Ganapati Atharvasirsha.

== Etymology and other names ==
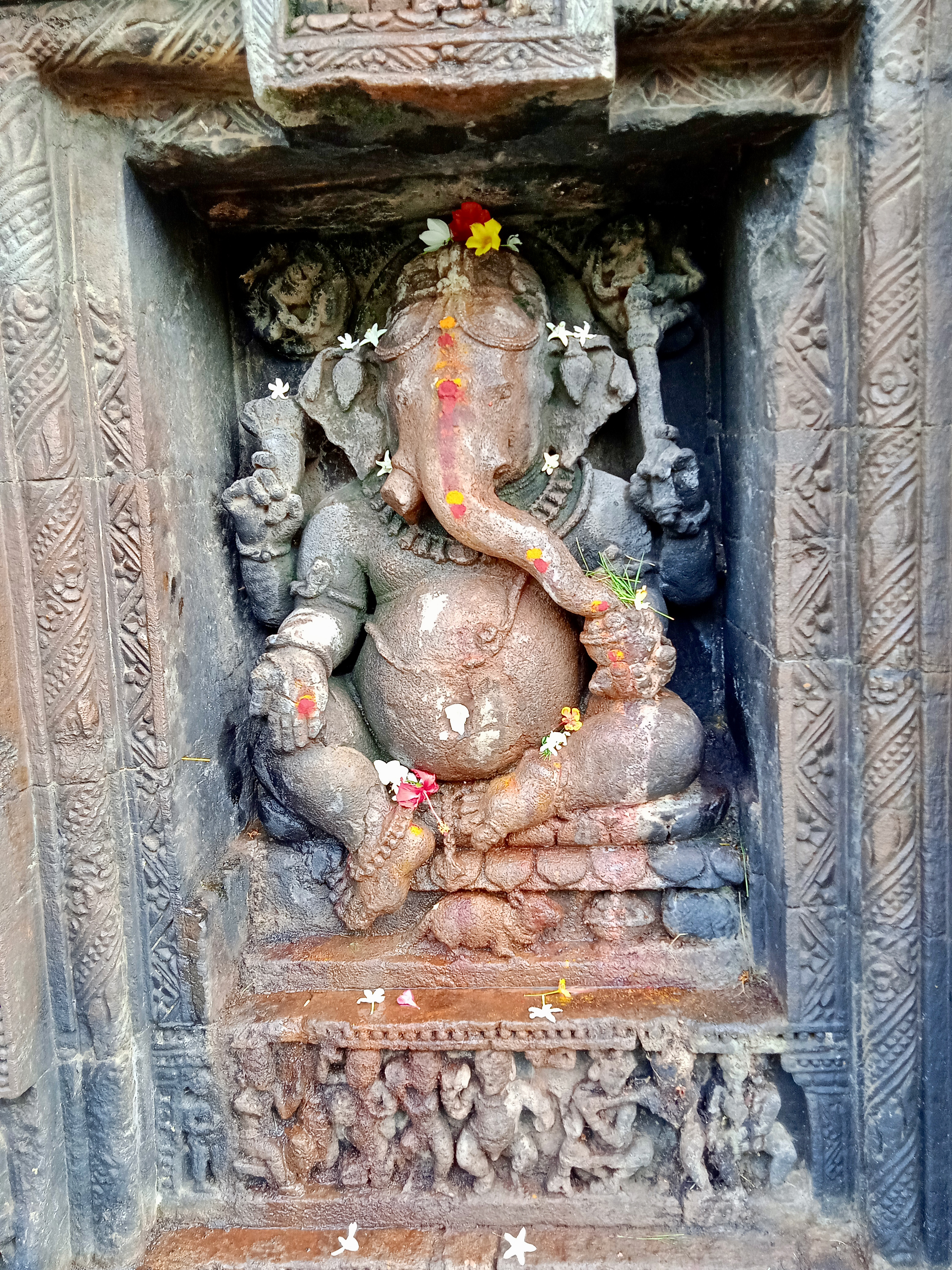
700-CE Kalinga-style Ganesha with shrew below, Someshwara Temple, Mukhalingam, Andhra Pradesh

Ganesha has been ascribed many other titles and epithets, including Ganapati (Ganpati), Vighneshvara, and Pillaiyar. The Hindu title of respect Shri (Sanskrit: श्री; IAST: śrī; also spelled Sri or Shree) is often added before his name.

The name Ganesha is a Sanskrit compound, joining the words gana (gaṇa), meaning a 'group, multitude, or categorical system' and isha (īśa), meaning 'lord or master'. The word gaṇa when associated with Ganesha is often taken to refer to the gaṇas, a troop of semi-divine beings that form part of the retinue of Shiva, Ganesha's father. The term more generally means a category, class, community, association, or corporation. Some commentators interpret the name "Lord of the Gaṇas" to mean "Lord of Hosts" or "Lord of created categories", such as the elements. Ganapati (गणपति; gaṇapati), a synonym for Ganesha, is a compound composed of gaṇa, meaning "group", and pati, meaning "ruler" or "lord". Though the earliest mention of the word Ganapati is found in hymn 2.23.1 of the 2nd-millennium BCE Rigveda, it is uncertain that the Vedic term referred specifically to Ganesha. The Amarakosha, an early Sanskrit lexicon, lists eight synonyms of Ganesha: Vinayaka, Vighnarāja (equivalent to Vighnesha), Dvaimātura (one who has two mothers), Gaṇādhipa (equivalent to Ganapati and Ganesha), Ekadanta (one who has one tusk), Heramba, Lambodara (one who has a pot belly, or, literally, one who has a hanging belly), and Gajanana (gajānana), having the face of an elephant.

Vinayaka (विनायक; vināyaka) or Binayaka is a common name for Ganesha that appears in the Purāṇas and in Buddhist Tantras. This name is reflected in the naming of the eight famous Ganesha temples in Maharashtra known as the Ashtavinayak (Marathi: अष्टविनायक, aṣṭavināyaka). The names Vighnesha (विघ्नेश; vighneśa) and Vighneshvara (विघ्नेश्वर; vighneśvara) (Lord of Obstacles) refers to his primary function in Hinduism as the master and remover of obstacles (vighna).

A prominent name for Ganesha in the Tamil language is Pillai (Tamil: பிள்ளை) or Pillaiyar (பிள்ளையார்). A. K. Narain differentiates these terms by saying that pillai means a "child" while pillaiyar means a "noble child". He adds that the words pallu, pella, and pell in the Dravidian family of languages signify "tooth or tusk", also "elephant tooth or tusk". Anita Raina Thapan notes that the root word pille in the name Pillaiyar might have originally meant "the young of the elephant", because the Pali word pillaka means "a young elephant".

In the Burmese language, Ganesha is known as Maha Peinne (မဟာပိန္နဲ, pronounced [məhà pèiɰ̃né]), derived from Pali Mahā Wināyaka (မဟာဝိနာယက). The widespread name of Ganesha in Thailand is Khanet (can be transliterated as Ganet), or the more official title of Phra Phi Khanet. The earliest images and mention lists Ganesha as a major deity in present-day Indonesia, Thailand, Cambodia and Vietnam dating to the 7th and 8th centuries, and these mirror Indian examples of the 5th century or earlier. In Sri Lankan, among Sinhalese Buddhists, he is known as Gana deviyo, and revered along with Vishnu, Skanda, Buddha and other deities.

== Iconography ==
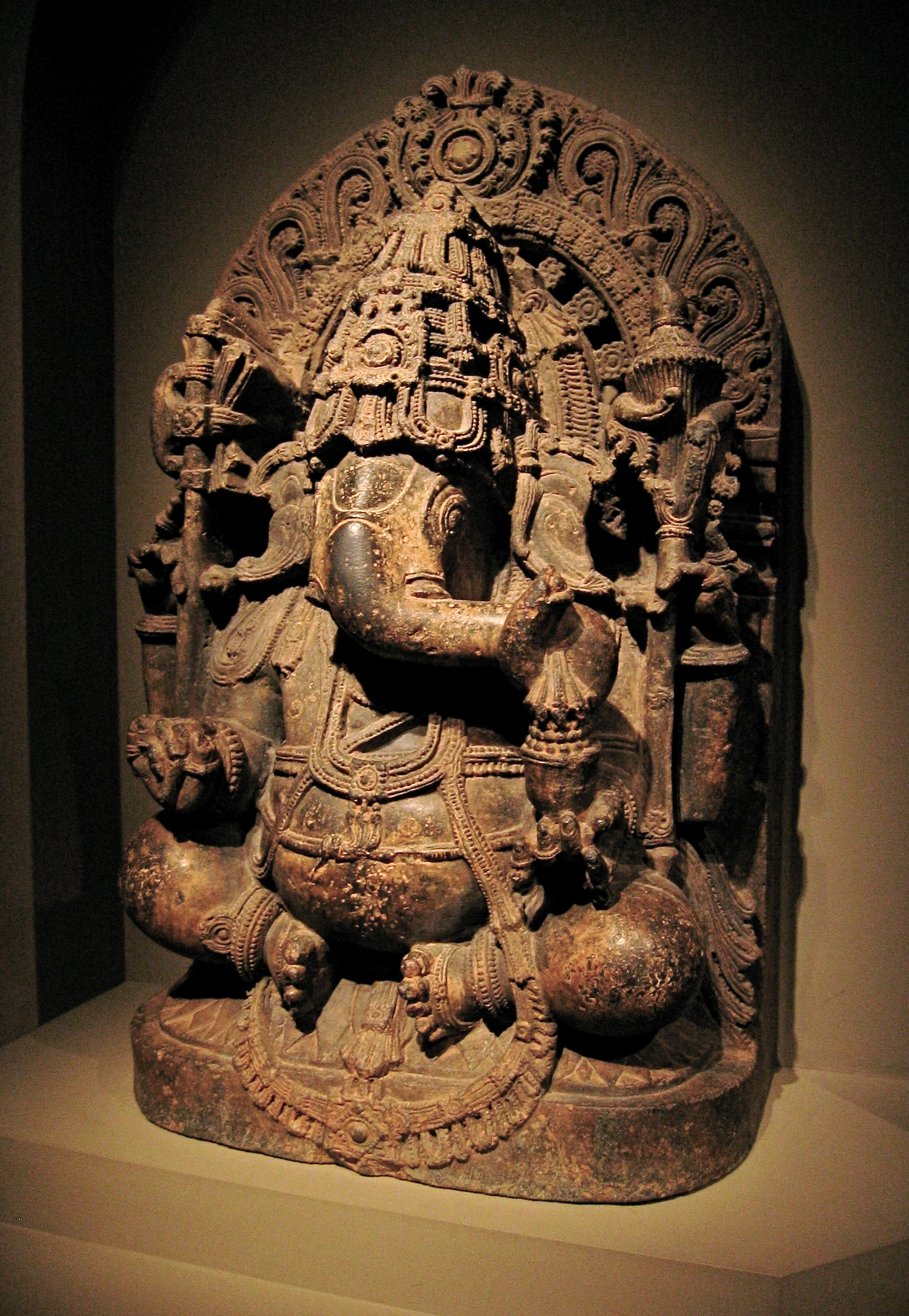
A 13th-century statue of Ganesha, Hoysala-style, Karnataka

Ganesha is a popular figure in Indian art. Unlike those of some deities, representations of Ganesha show wide variations and distinct patterns changing over time. He may be portrayed standing, dancing, heroically taking action against demons, playing with his family as a boy, sitting down on an elevated seat, or engaging in a range of contemporary situations.

Ganesha images were prevalent in many parts of India by the 6th century. The 13th-century statue pictured is typical of Ganesha statuary from 900 to 1200, after Ganesha had been well-established as an independent deity with his own sect. This example features some of Ganesha's common iconographic elements. A virtually identical statue has been dated between 973 and 1200 by Paul Martin-Dubost, and another similar statue is dated 12th century by Pratapaditya Pal. Ganesha has the head of an elephant and a big belly. This statue has four arms, which is common in depictions of Ganesha. He holds his own broken tusk in his lower-right hand and holds a delicacy, which he samples with his trunk, in his lower-left hand. The motif of Ganesha turning his trunk sharply to his left to taste a sweet in his lower-left hand is a particularly archaic feature. A more primitive statue in one of the Ellora Caves with this general form has been dated to the 7th century. Details of the other hands are difficult to make out on the statue shown. In the standard configuration, Ganesha typically holds an axe or a goad in one upper arm and a pasha (noose) in the other upper arm. In rare instances, he may be depicted with a human head. (Note: For the human-headed form of Ganesha in: Adi Vinayaka temple near Koothanur, Tamil Nadu.; Cambodia, see Brown 1991, p. 10; Nandrudayan Vinayaka Temple.; Uthrapathiswaraswamy Temple.)

The influence of this old constellation of iconographic elements can still be seen in contemporary representations of Ganesha. In one modern form, the only variation from these old elements is that the lower-right hand does not hold the broken tusk but is turned towards the viewer in a gesture of protection or fearlessness (Abhaya mudra). The same combination of four arms and attributes occurs in statues of Ganesha dancing, which is a very popular theme.

=== Common attributes ===
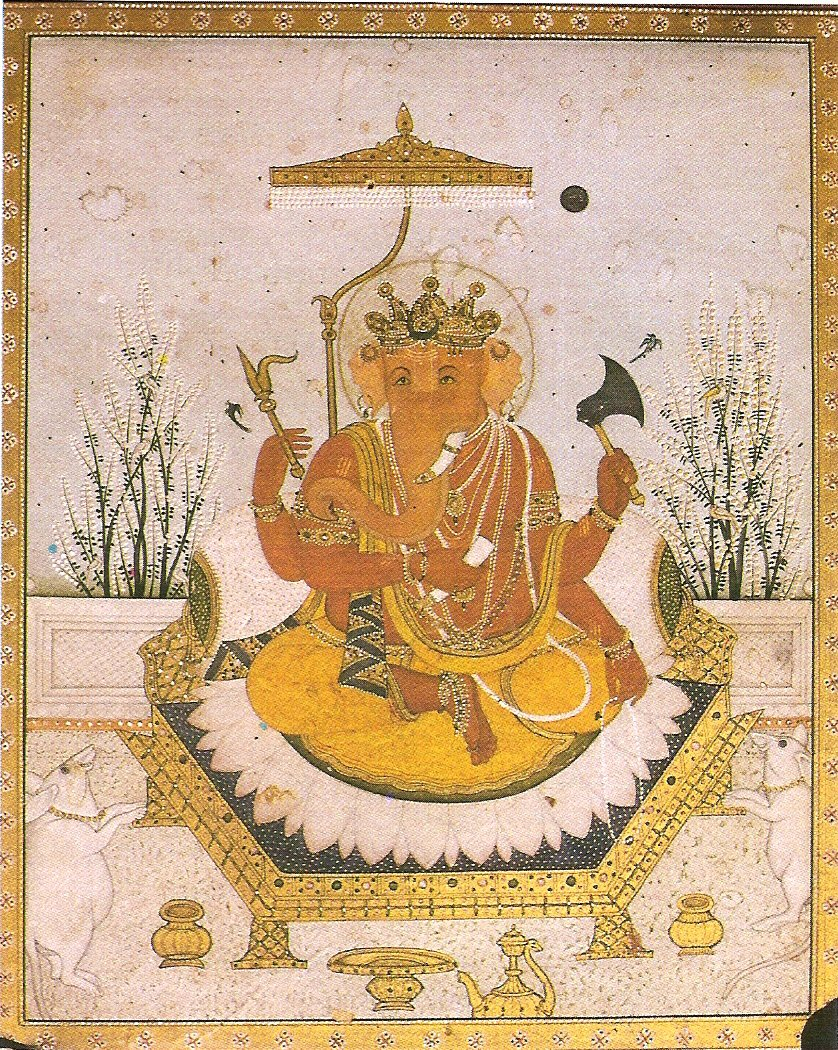
A typical four-armed form. Miniature of Nurpur school (circa 1810)

Ganesha has been represented with the head of an elephant since the early stages of his appearance in Indian art. Puranic myths provide many explanations for how he got his elephant head. One of his popular forms, Heramba-Ganapati, has five elephant heads, and other less-common variations in the number of heads are known. While some texts say that Ganesha was born with an elephant head, he acquires the head later in most stories. The most recurrent motif in these stories is that Ganesha was created by Parvati using clay to protect her and Shiva beheaded him when Ganesha came between Shiva and Parvati. Shiva then replaced Ganesha's original head with that of an elephant. Details of the battle and where the replacement head came from vary from source to source. Another story says that Ganesha was created directly by Shiva's laughter. Because Shiva considered Ganesha too alluring, he gave him the head of an elephant and a protruding belly.

Ganesha's earliest name was Ekadanta (One Tusked), referring to his single whole tusk, the other being broken. Some of the earliest images of Ganesha show him holding his broken tusk. The importance of this distinctive feature is reflected in the Mudgala Purana, which states that the name of Ganesha's second incarnation is Ekadanta. Ganesha's protruding belly appears as a distinctive attribute in his earliest statuary, which dates to the Gupta period (4th to 6th centuries). This feature is so important that according to the Mudgala Purana, two different incarnations of Ganesha use names based on it: Lambodara (Pot Belly, or, literally, Hanging Belly) and Mahodara (Great Belly). Both names are Sanskrit compounds describing his belly (IAST: udara). The Brahmanda Purana says that Ganesha has the name Lambodara because all the universes (i.e., cosmic eggs; IAST: brahmāṇḍas) of the past, present, and future are present in him.

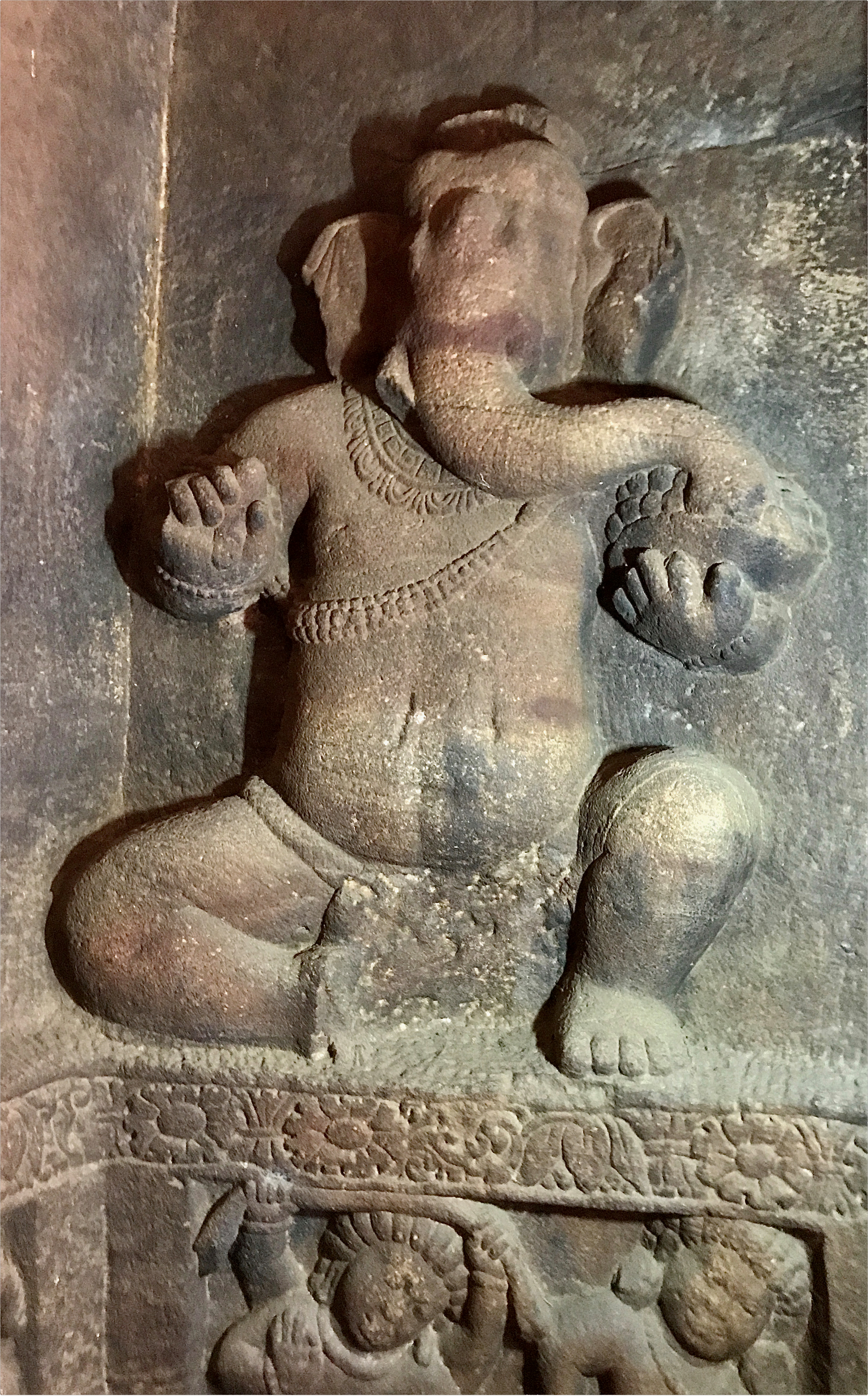
6th-century Ganesha Statue in Badami caves temples, depicting Ganesha with two arms

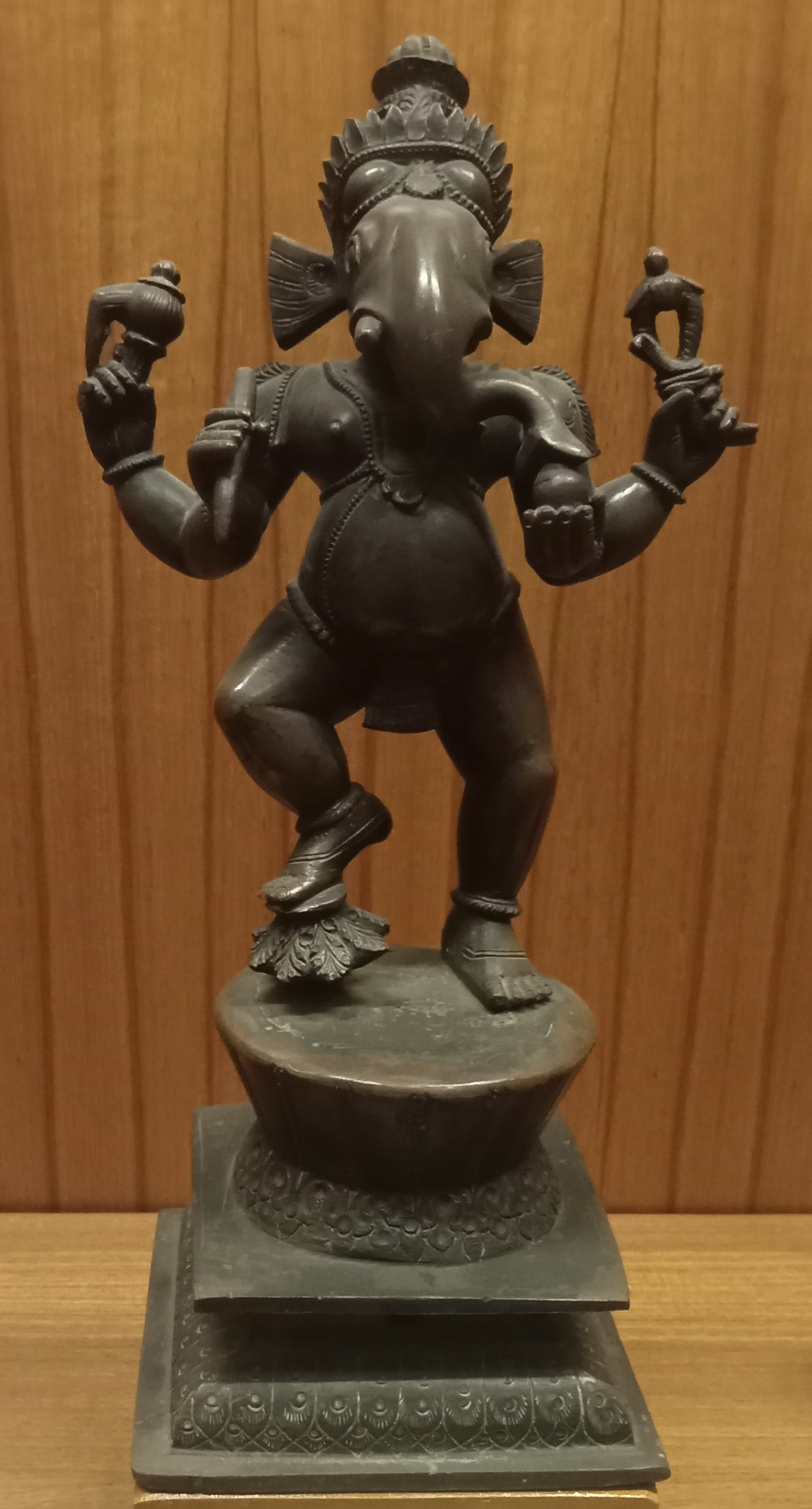
Ganesha in Bronze from 13th century Vijayanagara Empire, depicting Ganesha with four arms

The number of Ganesha's arms varies; his best-known forms have between two and sixteen arms. Many depictions of Ganesha feature four arms, which is mentioned in Puranic sources and codified as a standard form in some iconographic texts. His earliest images had two arms. Forms with 14 and 20 arms appeared in Central India during the 9th and the 10th centuries. The serpent is a common feature in Ganesha iconography and appears in many forms. According to the Ganesha Purana, Ganesha wrapped the serpent Vasuki around his neck. Other depictions of snakes include use as a sacred thread (IAST: yajñyopavīta) wrapped around the stomach as a belt, held in a hand, coiled at the ankles, or as a throne. Upon Ganesha's forehead may be a third eye or the sectarian mark (IAST: tilaka), which consists of three horizontal lines. The Ganesha Purana prescribes a tilaka mark as well as a crescent moon on the forehead. A distinct form of Ganesha called Bhalachandra (IAST: bhālacandra; "Moon on the Forehead") includes that iconographic element.

Ganesha is often described as red in colour. Specific colours are associated with certain forms. Many examples of color associations with specific meditation forms are prescribed in the Sritattvanidhi, a treatise on Hindu iconography. For example, white is associated with his representations as Heramba-Ganapati and Rina-Mochana-Ganapati (Ganapati Who Releases from Bondage). Ekadanta-Ganapati is visualised as blue during meditation in that form.

=== Vahanas ===
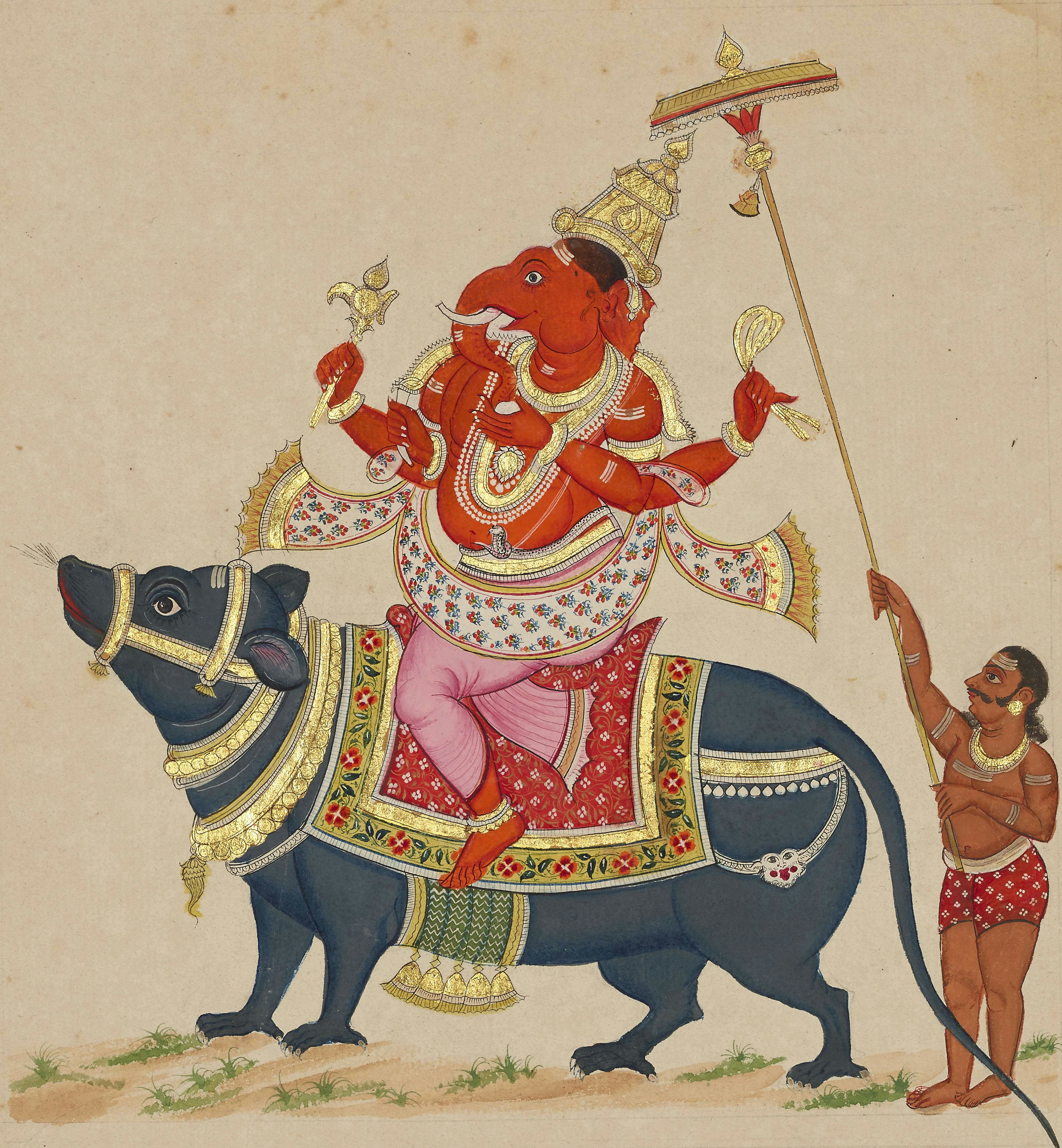
Ganesha on his vahana mūṣaka the rat, c. 1820

The earliest Ganesha images are without a vahana (mount/vehicle). Of the eight incarnations of Ganesha described in the Mudgala Purana, Ganesha uses a mouse (shrew) named Mushaka in five of them, a lion in his incarnation as Vakratunda, a peacock in his incarnation as Vikata, and Shesha, the divine serpent, in his incarnation as Vighnaraja. Mohotkata uses a lion, Mayūreśvara uses a peacock, Dhumraketu uses a horse, and Gajanana uses a mouse, in the four incarnations of Ganesha listed in the Ganesha Purana. Jain depictions of Ganesha show his vahana variously as a mouse, elephant, tortoise, ram, or peacock.

Ganesha is often shown riding on or attended by a mouse. Martin-Dubost says that the rat began to appear as the principal vehicle in sculptures of Ganesha in central and western India during the 7th century; the rat was always placed close to his feet. The mouse as a mount first appears in written sources in the Matsya Purana and later in the Brahmananda Purana and Ganesha Purana, where Ganesha uses it as his vehicle in his last incarnation. The Ganapati Atharvashirsa includes a meditation verse on Ganesha that describes the mouse appearing on his flag. The names Mūṣakavāhana (mouse-mount) and Ākhuketana (rat-banner) appear in the Ganesha Sahasranama.

The mouse is interpreted in several ways. According to Grimes, "Many, if not most of those who interpret Gaṇapati's mouse, do so negatively; it symbolizes tamoguṇa as well as desire". Along these lines, Michael Wilcockson says it symbolises those who wish to overcome desires and be less selfish. Krishan notes that the rat is destructive and a menace to crops. The Sanskrit word mūṣaka (mouse) is derived from the root mūṣ (stealing, robbing). It was essential to subdue the rat as a destructive pest, a type of vighna (impediment) that needed to be overcome. According to this theory, showing Ganesha as master of the rat demonstrates his function as Vigneshvara (Lord of Obstacles) and gives evidence of his possible role as a folk grāma-devatā (village deity) who later rose to greater prominence. Martin-Dubost notes a view that the rat is a symbol suggesting that Ganesha, like the rat, penetrates even the most secret places.

== Features ==
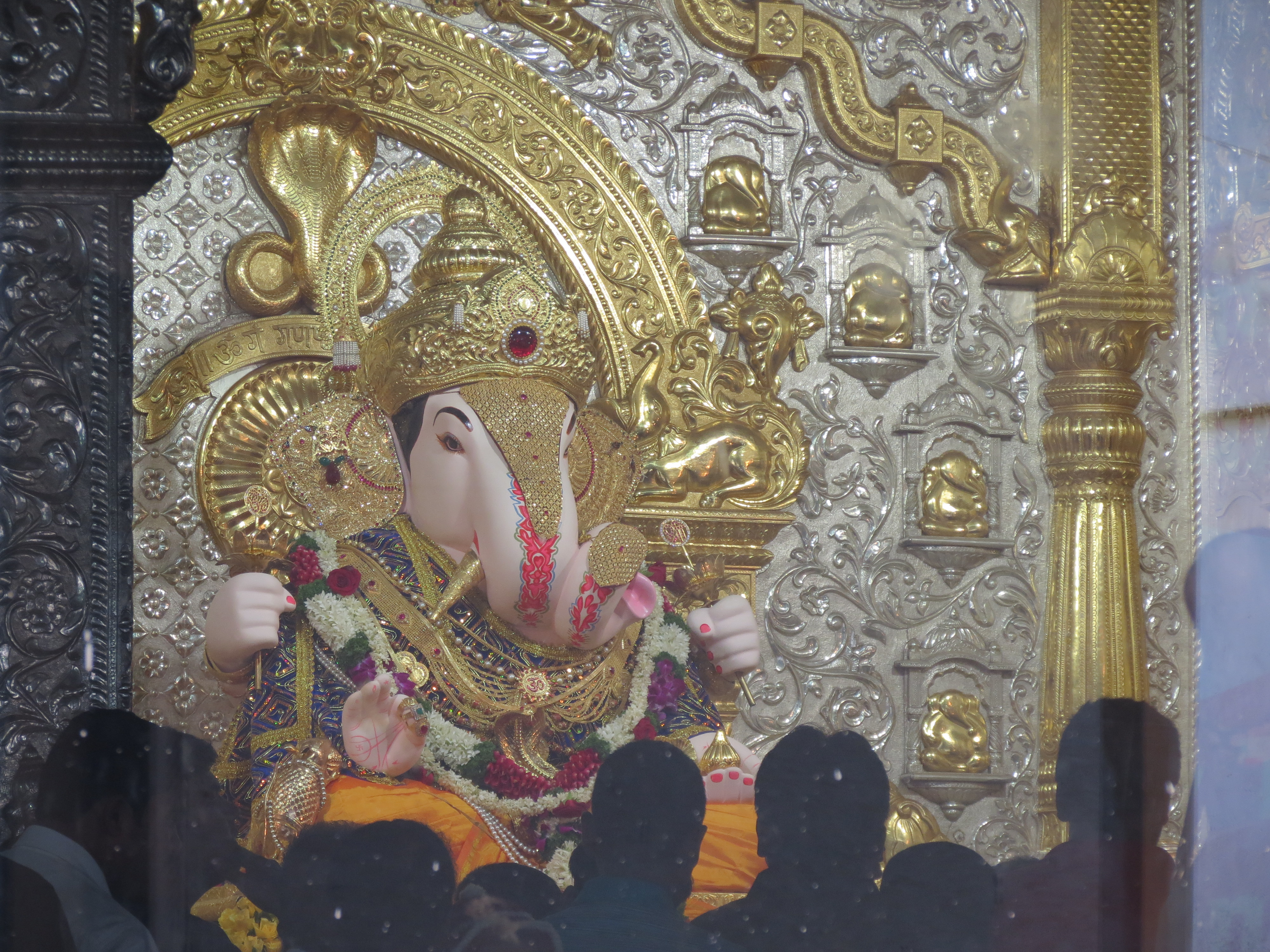
The central icon of Ganesha at the Dagadusheth Halwai Ganapati temple.

=== Removal of obstacles ===
Ganesha is Vighneshvara (Vighnaraja, Marathi – Vighnaharta), the Lord of Obstacles, both of a material and spiritual order. He is popularly worshipped as a remover of obstacles, though traditionally he also places obstacles in the path of those who need to be checked. Hence, he is often worshipped by the people before they begin anything new. Paul Courtright says that Ganesha's dharma and his raison d'être is to create and remove obstacles.

Krishan notes that some of Ganesha's names reflect shadings of multiple roles that have evolved over time. Dhavalikar ascribes the quick ascension of Ganesha in the Hindu pantheon, and the emergence of the Ganapatyas, to this shift in emphasis from vighnakartā (obstacle-creator) to vighnahartā (obstacle-averter). However, both functions continue to be vital to his character.

=== Buddhi (Intelligence) ===
Ganesha is considered to be the Lord of letters and learning. In Sanskrit, the word buddhi is an active noun that can be translated as intelligence, wisdom, or intellect. The concept of buddhi is closely associated with Ganesha's personality, especially during the Puranic period, as many stories emphasize his cleverness and love of learning and intelligence. One of Ganesha's names in the Ganesha Purana and the Ganesha Sahasranama is Buddhipriya. This name also appears among the 21 names at the end of the Ganesha Sahasranama that Ganesha notes as especially important. The word priya can mean "fond of," and in a marital context, can mean "lover" or "husband." Therefore, the name may mean either "Fond of Intelligence" or "Buddhi's Husband."

=== Om ===
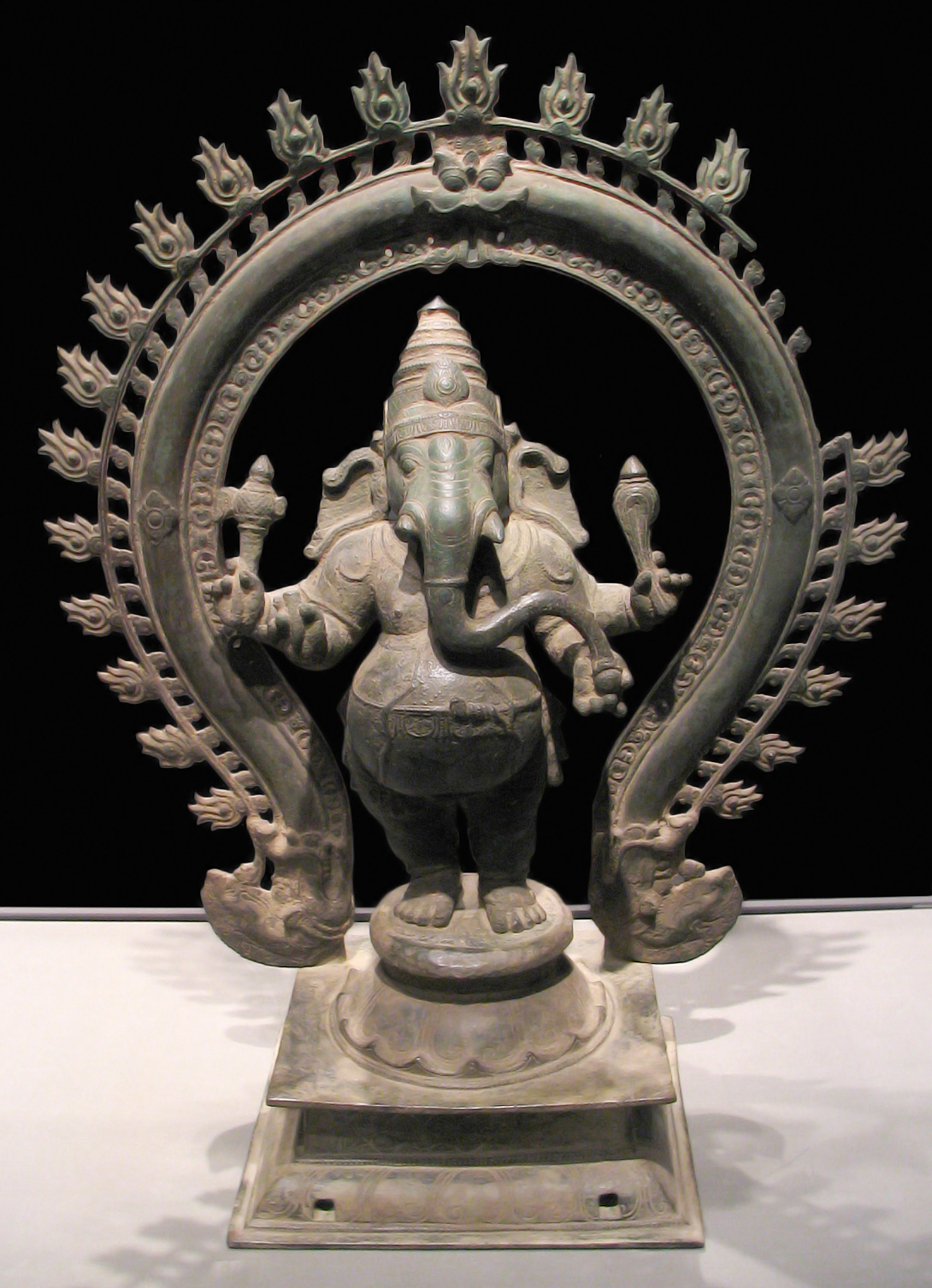
Ganesha, Chola period, early 13th century.

Ganesha is identified with the Hindu mantra Om. The term oṃkārasvarūpa (Om is his form), when identified with Ganesha, refers to the notion that he personifies the primal sound. The Ganapati Atharvashirsa attests to this association. Chinmayananda translates the relevant passage as follows:

(O Lord Ganapati!) You are (the Trimurti) Brahma, Vishnu, and Mahesa. You are Indra. You are fire [Agni] and air [Vāyu]. You are the sun [Sūrya] and the moon [Chandrama]. You are Brahman. You are (the three worlds) Bhuloka [earth], Antariksha-loka [space], and Swargaloka [heaven]. You are Om. (That is to say, You are all this).

Some devotees see similarities between the shape of Ganesha's body in iconography and the shape of Om in the Devanāgarī and Tamil scripts.

=== First chakra ===
According to Kundalini yoga, Ganesha resides in the first chakra, called Muladhara (mūlādhāra). Mula means "original, main"; adhara means "base, foundation". The muladhara chakra is the principle on which the manifestation or outward expansion of primordial Divine Force rests. This association is also attested to in the Ganapati Atharvashirsa. Courtright translates this passage as follows: "You continually dwell in the sacral plexus at the base of the spine [mūlādhāra cakra]." Thus, Ganesha has a permanent abode in every being at the Muladhara. Ganesha holds, supports and guides all other chakras, thereby "governing the forces that propel the wheel of life".

== Family and consorts ==
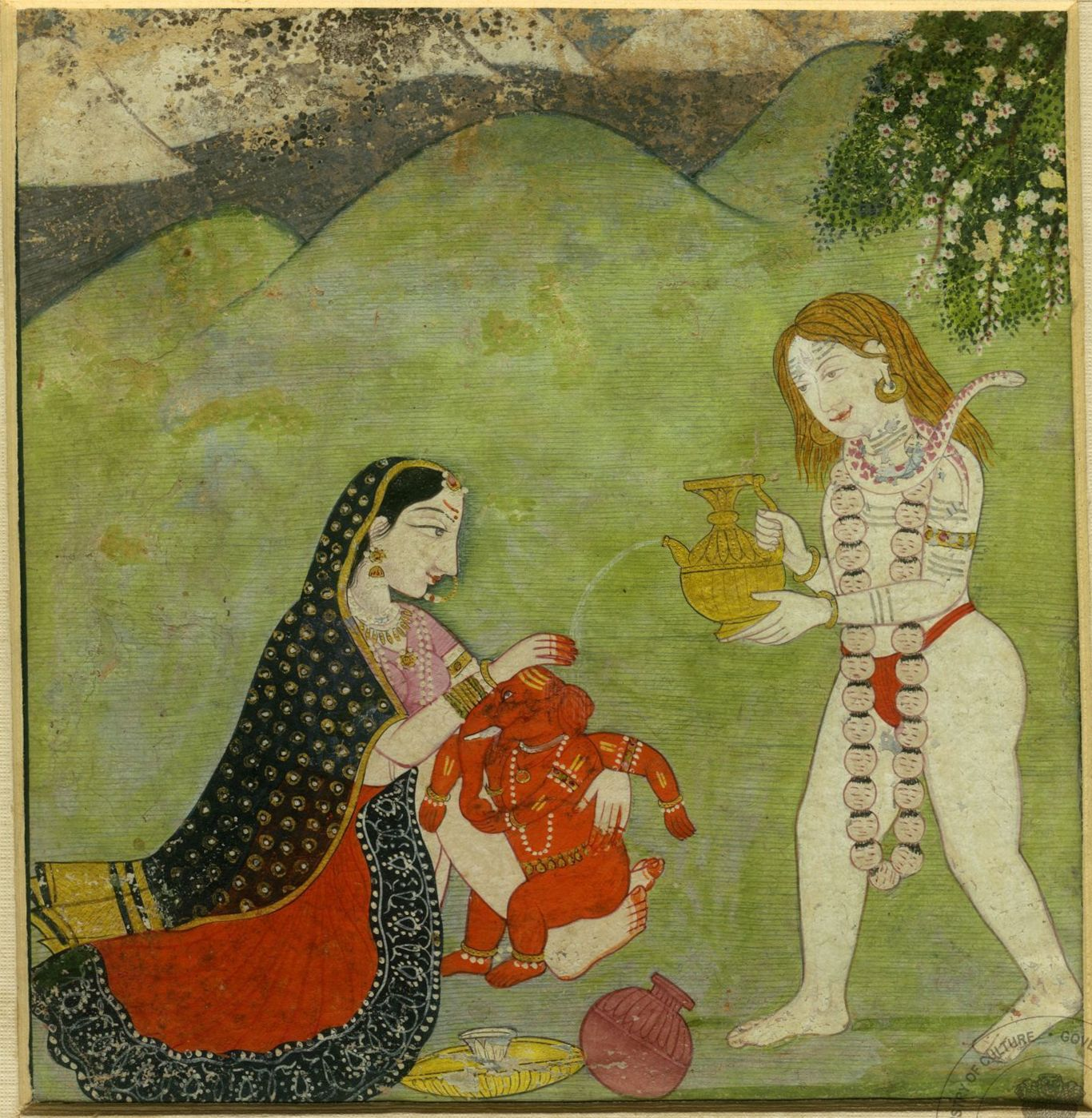
Shiva and Parvati giving a bath to Ganesha. Kangra miniature, 18th century. Allahabad Museum, New Delhi.

Though Ganesha is popularly held to be the son of Shiva and Parvati, the Puranic texts give different versions about his birth. In some he was created by Parvati, or by Shiva or created by Shiva and Parvati, in another he appeared mysteriously and was discovered by Shiva and Parvati or he was born from the elephant headed goddess Malini after she drank Parvati's bath water that had been thrown in the river.

The family includes his brother, the god of war, Kartikeya, who is also called Skanda and Murugan. Regional differences dictate the order of their births. In northern India, Skanda is generally said to be the elder, while in the south, Ganesha is considered the firstborn. In northern India, Skanda was an important martial deity from about 500 BCE to about 600 CE, after which worship of him declined significantly. As Skanda fell, Ganesha rose. Several stories tell of sibling rivalry between the brothers and may reflect sectarian tensions.

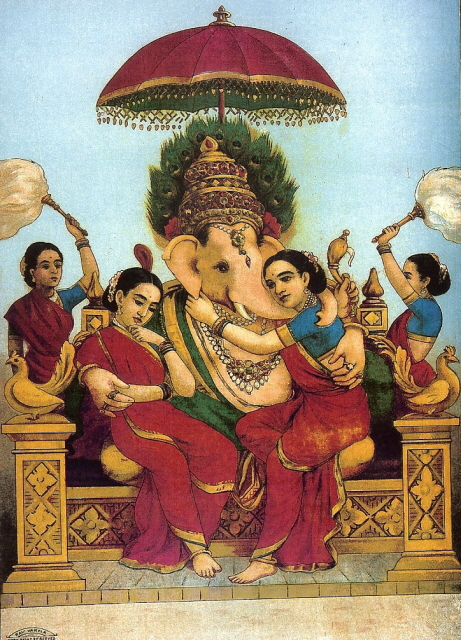
Ganesha with consorts Riddhi and Siddhi (spiritual power), Painting titled "Riddhi Siddhi" by Raja Ravi Varma (1848–1906)

Ganesha's marital status, the subject of considerable scholarly review, varies widely in mythological stories. One pattern of myths identifies Ganesha as an unmarried brahmachari. This view is common in southern India and parts of northern India. Another popularly-accepted mainstream pattern associates him with the concepts of Buddhi (intellect), Siddhi (spiritual power), and Riddhi (prosperity); these qualities are personified as goddesses, said to be Ganesha's wives. He also may be shown with a single consort or a nameless servant (Sanskrit: daşi). Another pattern connects Ganesha with the goddess of culture and the arts, Sarasvati or Śarda (particularly in Maharashtra). He is also associated with the goddess of luck and prosperity, Lakshmi. Another pattern, mainly prevalent in the Bengal region, links Ganesha with the banana tree, Kala Bo.

The Shiva Purana says that Ganesha had begotten two sons: Kşema (safety) and Lābha (profit). In northern Indian variants of this story, the sons are often said to be Śubha (auspiciousness) and Lābha. The 1975 Hindi film Jai Santoshi Maa shows Ganesha married to Riddhi and Siddhi and having a daughter named Santoshi Ma, the goddess of satisfaction. This story has no Puranic basis, but Anita Raina Thapan and Lawrence Cohen cite Santoshi Ma's cult as evidence of Ganesha's continuing evolution as a popular deity.

== Worship and festivals ==
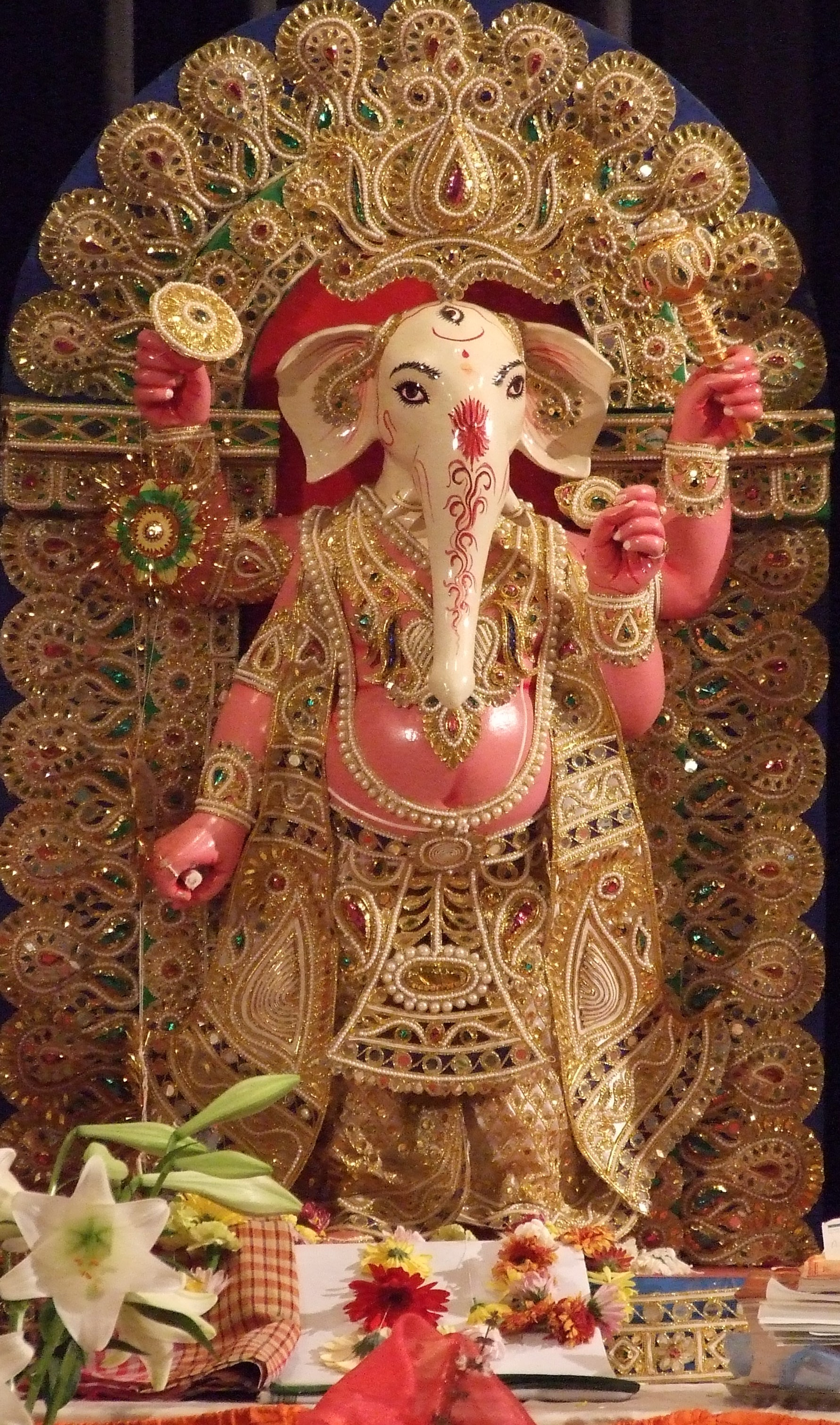
Ganesha worshipped in the Durga Puja celebrations in Cologne

Ganesha is worshipped on many religious and secular occasions; especially at the beginning of ventures such as buying a vehicle or starting a business. K.N Soumyaji says, "there can hardly be a [Hindu] home [in India] which does not house an idol of Ganapati. ... Ganapati, being the most popular deity in India, is worshipped by almost all castes and in all parts of the country". Devotees believe that if Ganesha is propitiated, he grants success, prosperity and protection against adversity.

Ganesha is a non-sectarian deity. Hindus of all denominations invoke him at the beginning of prayers, important undertakings, and religious ceremonies. Dancers and musicians, particularly in southern India, begin art performances such as the Bharatanatyam dance with a prayer to Ganesha. Mantras such as Om Shri Gaṇeshāya Namah (Om, salutation to the Illustrious Ganesha) are often used. One of the most famous mantras associated with Ganesha is Om Gaṃ Ganapataye Namah (Om, Gaṃ, Salutation to the Lord of Hosts).

Devotees offer Ganesha sweets such as modaka and small sweet balls called laddus. He is often shown carrying a bowl of sweets, called a modakapātra. Because of his identification with the color red, he is often worshipped with red sandalwood paste (raktachandana) or red flowers. Dūrvā grass (Cynodon dactylon) and other materials are also used in his worship.

Festivals associated with Ganesh are Ganesha Chaturthi or Vināyaka chaturthī in the śuklapakṣa (the fourth day of the waxing moon) in the month of Bhadrapada (August/September) and the Ganesh Jayanti (Ganesha's birthday) celebrated on the cathurthī of the śuklapakṣa (fourth day of the waxing moon) in the month of magha (January/February)."

=== Ganesh Chaturthi ===
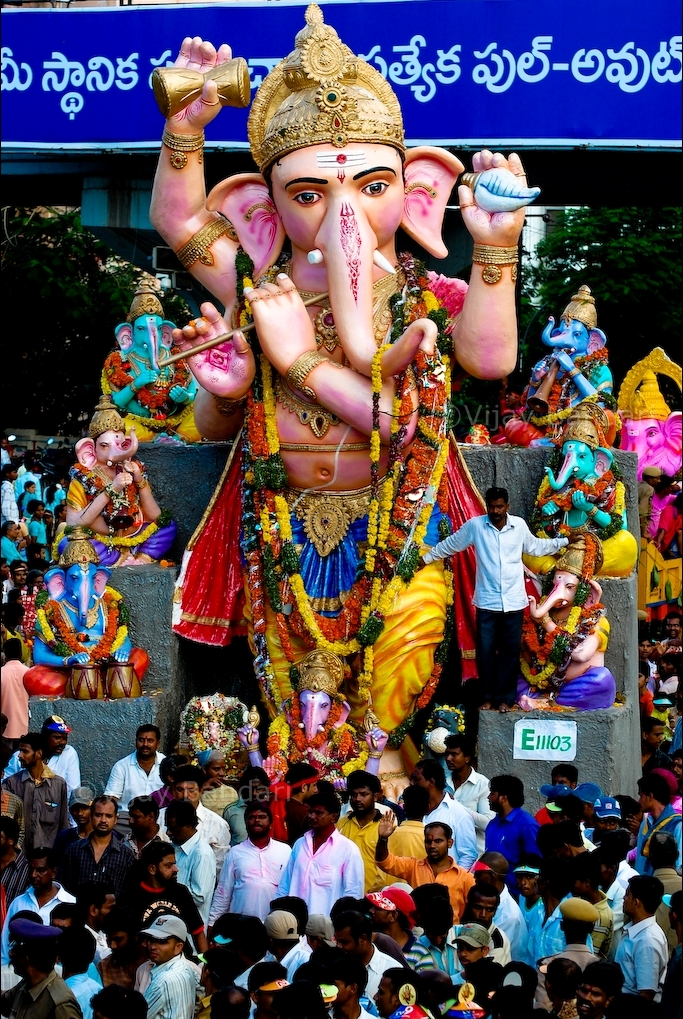
Street festivities in Hyderabad, India during the festival of Ganesh Chaturthi

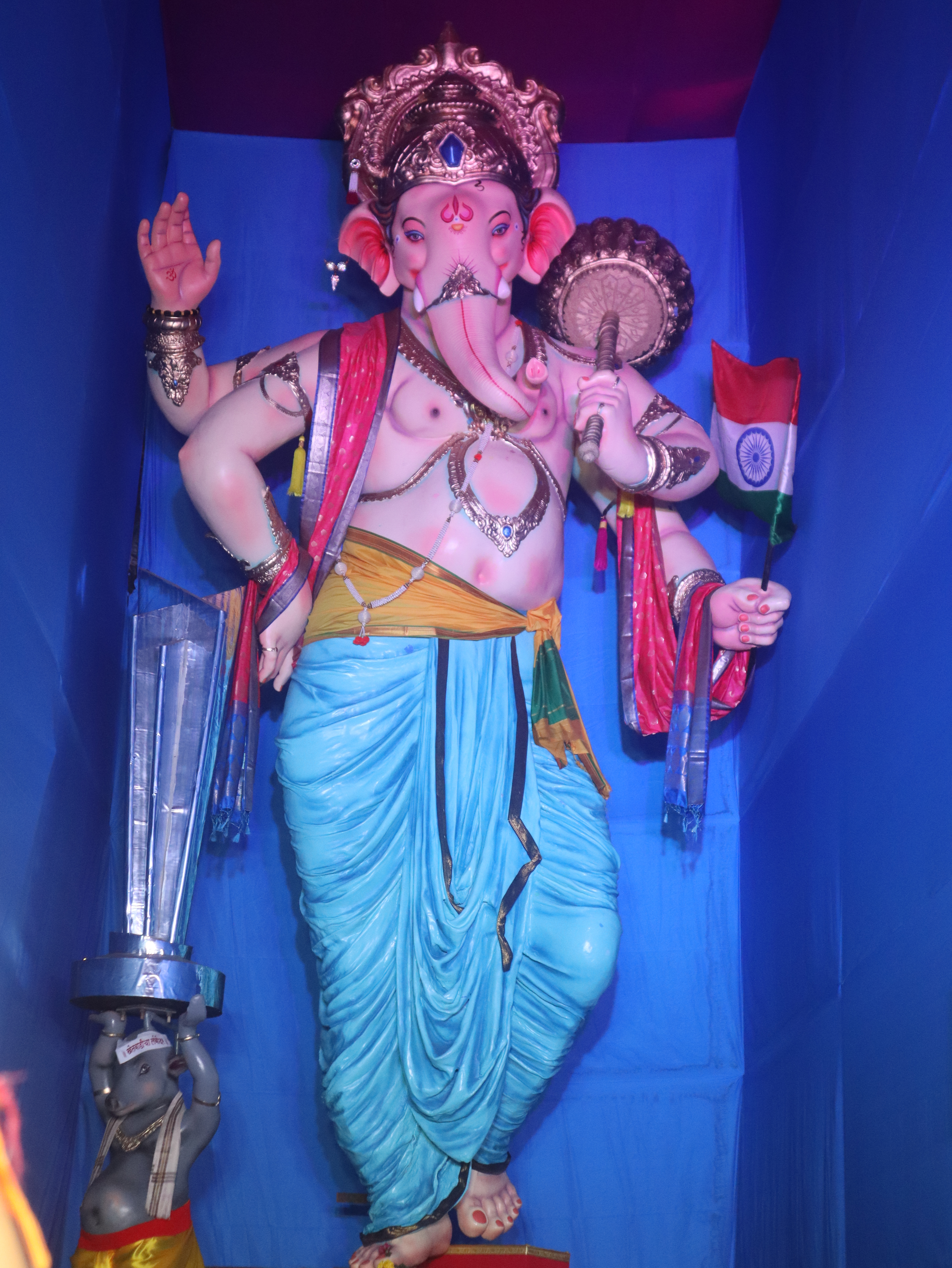
Mumbai's depiction of "Khetwadi Cha Lambodar".

An annual festival honours Ganesha for ten days, starting on Ganesh Chaturthi, which typically falls in late August or early September. The festival begins with people bringing in clay idols of Ganesha, symbolising the god's visit. The festival culminates on the day of Ananta Chaturdashi, when the idols (murtis) are immersed in the most convenient body of water. Some families have a tradition of immersion on the 2nd, 3rd, 5th, or 7th day. In 1893, Lokmanya Tilak transformed this annual Ganesha festival from private family celebrations into a grand public event. He did so "to bridge the gap between the Brahmins and the non-Brahmins and find an appropriate context in which to build a new grassroots unity between them" in his nationalistic strivings against the British in Maharashtra. Because of Ganesha's wide appeal as "the god for Everyman", Tilak chose him as a rallying point for Indian protest against British rule. Tilak was the first to install large public images of Ganesha in pavilions, and he established the practice of submerging all the public images on the tenth day.

Today, Hindus across India celebrate the Ganapati festival with great fervour, though it is most popular in the state of Maharashtra. The festival also assumes huge proportions in Mumbai, Pune, and in the surrounding belt of Ashtavinayaka temples.

=== Temples ===
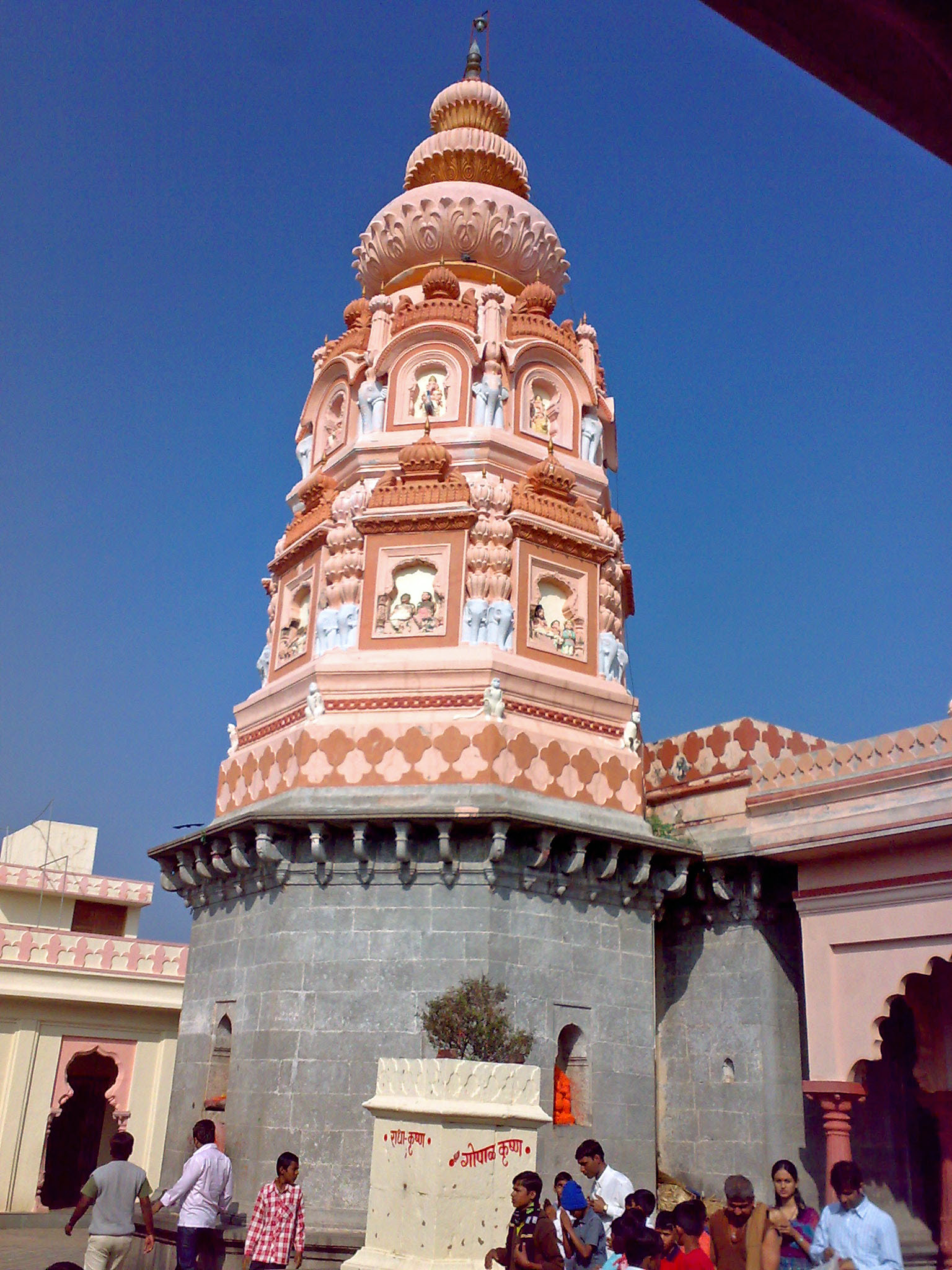
The Morgaon temple, the chief Ashtavinyak temple

In Hindu temples, Ganesha is depicted in various ways: as a subordinate deity (pãrśva-devatã); as a deity related to the principal deity (parivāra-devatã); or as the principal deity of the temple (pradhāna). As the god of transitions, he is placed at the doorway of many Hindu temples to keep out the unworthy, which is analogous to his role as Parvati's doorkeeper. In addition, several shrines are dedicated to Ganesha himself, of which the Ashtavinayak (Sanskrit: अष्टविनायक; aṣṭavināyaka; lit. "eight Ganesha (shrines)") in Maharashtra are particularly well known. Located within a 100-kilometer radius of the city of Pune, each of the eight shrines celebrates a particular form of Ganapati, complete with its own lore. The eight shrines are: Morgaon, Siddhatek, Pali, Mahad, Theur, Lenyadri, Ozar and Ranjangaon.

There are many other important Ganesha temples at the following locations: Siddhivinayak temple in Mumbai, Ganpatipule temple at Ganpatipule, Binkhambi Ganesh mandir in Kolhapur, Jai Vinayak temple in Jaigad, Ratnagiri, Wai in Maharashtra; Ujjain in Madhya Pradesh; Jodhpur, Nagaur and Raipur (Pali) in Rajasthan; Baidyanath in Bihar; Baroda, Dholaka, and Valsad in Gujarat and Dhundiraj Temple in Varanasi, Uttar Pradesh. Prominent Ganesha temples in southern India include the following: Kanipakam in Andhra Pradesh; the Rockfort Ucchi Pillayar Temple at Tiruchirapalli, Puliakulam Munthi Vinayagar Temple at Coimbatore and Karpaga Vinayagar Temple in Pillaiyarpatti which is a town named after Ganesha in Tamil Nadu; Kottarakkara, Pazhavangadi, Kasargod in Kerala; Hampi, and Idagunji in Karnataka; and Bhadrachalam in Telangana.

T. A. Gopinatha notes, "Every village however small has its own image of Vighneśvara (Vigneshvara) with or without a temple to house it in. At entrances of villages and forts, below pīpaḹa (Sacred fig) trees ... in a niche ... in temples of Viṣṇu (Vishnu) as well as Śiva (Shiva) and also in separate shrines specially constructed in Śiva temples ... the figure of Vighneśvara is invariably seen." Ganesha temples have also been built outside of India, including Southeast Asia, Nepal (including the four Vinayaka shrines in the Kathmandu Valley), and in several western countries.

== Rise to prominence ==
=== First appearance ===
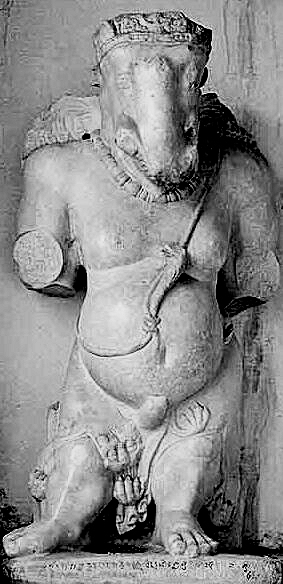
The Gardez Ganesha, a 7th-century marble Ganesha found in Gardez, Afghanistan, and once displayed at Dargah Pir Rattan Nath, Kabul.

Some scholars have proposed an elephant–headed anthropomorphic figure on Indo-Greek coins from the 1st century BCE to be an early representation of Ganesha, but this has been strongly contested. Others have suggested Ganesha may have been an emerging deity in India and southeast Asia around the 2nd century CE based on the evidence from archaeological excavations in Mathura and outside India. The first terracotta images of Ganesha are from 1st century CE and were found in Ter, Pal, Verrapuram, and Chandraketugarh. These figures are small, with an elephant head, two arms, and endomorphic physique. The earliest Ganesha icons in stone were carved in Mathura during Kushan times (2nd–3rd centuries CE).

Ganesha appeared in his classic form as a clearly-recognizable deity with well-defined iconographic attributes in the early 4th to 5th centuries CE. Some of the earliest known Ganesha images include two images found in eastern Afghanistan. The first image was discovered in the ruins north of Kabul, along with those of Surya and Shiva and is dated to the 4th century. The second image found in Gardez, known as the Gardez Ganesha, has an inscription on the pedestal that has helped date it to the 5th century. Another Ganesha sculpture is embedded in the walls of Cave 6 of the Udayagiri Caves in Madhya Pradesh. This is dated to the 5th century. An early iconic image of Ganesha with elephant head, a bowl of sweets and a goddess sitting in his lap has been found in the ruins of the Bhumara Temple in Madhya Pradesh, and this is dated to the 5th-century Gupta period. Other recent discoveries, such as one from Ramgarh Hill, are also dated to the 4th or 5th century. An independent cult with Ganesha as the primary deity was well established by about the 10th century. Narain summarises the lack of evidence about Ganesha's history before the 5th century as follows:

What is inscrutable is the somewhat dramatic appearance of Gaṇeśa on the historical scene. His antecedents are not clear. His wide acceptance and popularity, which transcend sectarian and territorial limits, are indeed amazing. On the one hand, there is the pious belief of the orthodox devotees in Gaṇeśa's Vedic origins and in the Purāṇic explanations contained in the confusing, but nonetheless interesting, mythology. On the other hand, there are doubts about the existence of the idea and the icon of this deity" before the fourth to fifth century A.D. ... [I]n my opinion, indeed there is no convincing evidence [in ancient Brahmanic literature] of the existence of this divinity prior to the fifth century.

The evidence for an even more ancient Ganesha, suggests Narain, may reside outside Brahmanic or Sanskritic traditions, or outside geocultural boundaries of India. Ganesha appears in China by the 6th century and his artistic images in temple settings as the remover of obstacles in South Asia appear by about 400 CE. He is, states Bailey, recognised as goddess Parvati's son and integrated into Shaivism theology by early centuries of the common era.

=== Possible influences ===
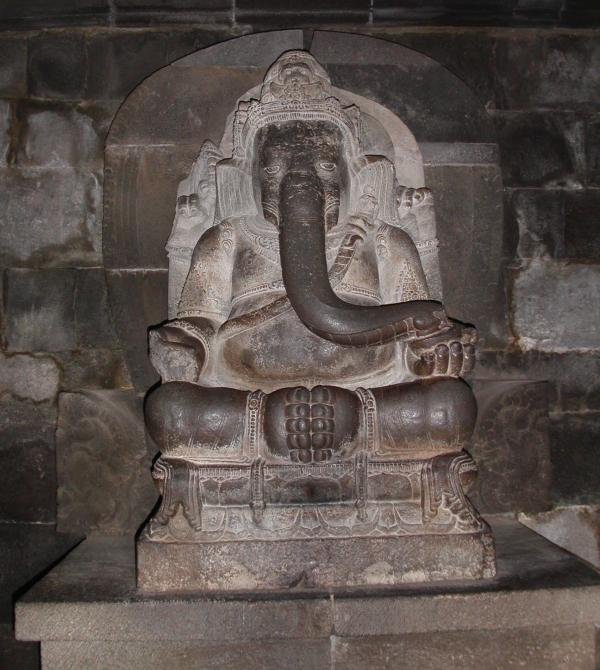
9th-century Ganesha Sculpture in Prambanan, Java, Indonesia

Courtright reviews various speculative theories about the early history of Ganesha, including supposed tribal traditions and animal cults, and dismisses all of them in this way:

In this search for a historical origin for Gaṇeśa, some have suggested precise locations outside the Brāhmaṇic tradition.... These historical locations are intriguing to be sure, but the fact remains that they are all speculations, variations on the Dravidian hypothesis, which argues that anything not attested to in the Vedic and Indo-European sources must have come into Brāhmaṇic religion from the Dravidian or aboriginal populations of India as part of the process that produced Hinduism out of the interactions of the Aryan and non-Aryan populations. There is no independent evidence for an elephant cult or a totem; nor is there any archaeological data pointing to a tradition prior to what we can already see in place in the Purāṇic literature and the iconography of Gaṇeśa.

Thapan's book on the development of Ganesha devotes a chapter to speculations about the role elephants had in early India but concludes that "although by the second century CE the elephant-headed yakṣa form exists it cannot be presumed to represent Gaṇapati-Vināyaka. There is no evidence of a deity by this name having an elephant or elephant-headed form at this early stage. Gaṇapati-Vināyaka had yet to make his debut."

The Pashupati seal (c. 2300 BCE - 2000 BCE) depicts 4 animals including an elephant around a deity who is claimed by some to be Shiva. Brown notes that this seal indicates the sacredness of elephants before Vedic period. One theory of the origin of Ganesha is that he gradually came to prominence in connection with the four Vinayakas (Vināyakas). In the Yajurveda, the Vināyakas were a group of four troublesome demons who created obstacles and difficulties but who were easily propitiated. The name Vināyaka is a common name for Ganesha both in the Purāṇas and in Buddhist Tantras. Krishan is one of the academics who accept this view, stating flatly of Ganesha, "He is a non-Vedic god. His origin is to be traced to the four Vināyakas, evil spirits, of the Mānavagŗhyasūtra (7th–4th century BCE) who cause various types of evil and suffering". Depictions of elephant-headed human figures, which some identify with Ganesha, appear in Indian art and coinage as early as the 2nd century. According to Ellawala, the elephant-headed Ganesha as lord of the Ganas was known to the people of Sri Lanka in the early pre-Christian era.

=== Vedic and epic literature ===
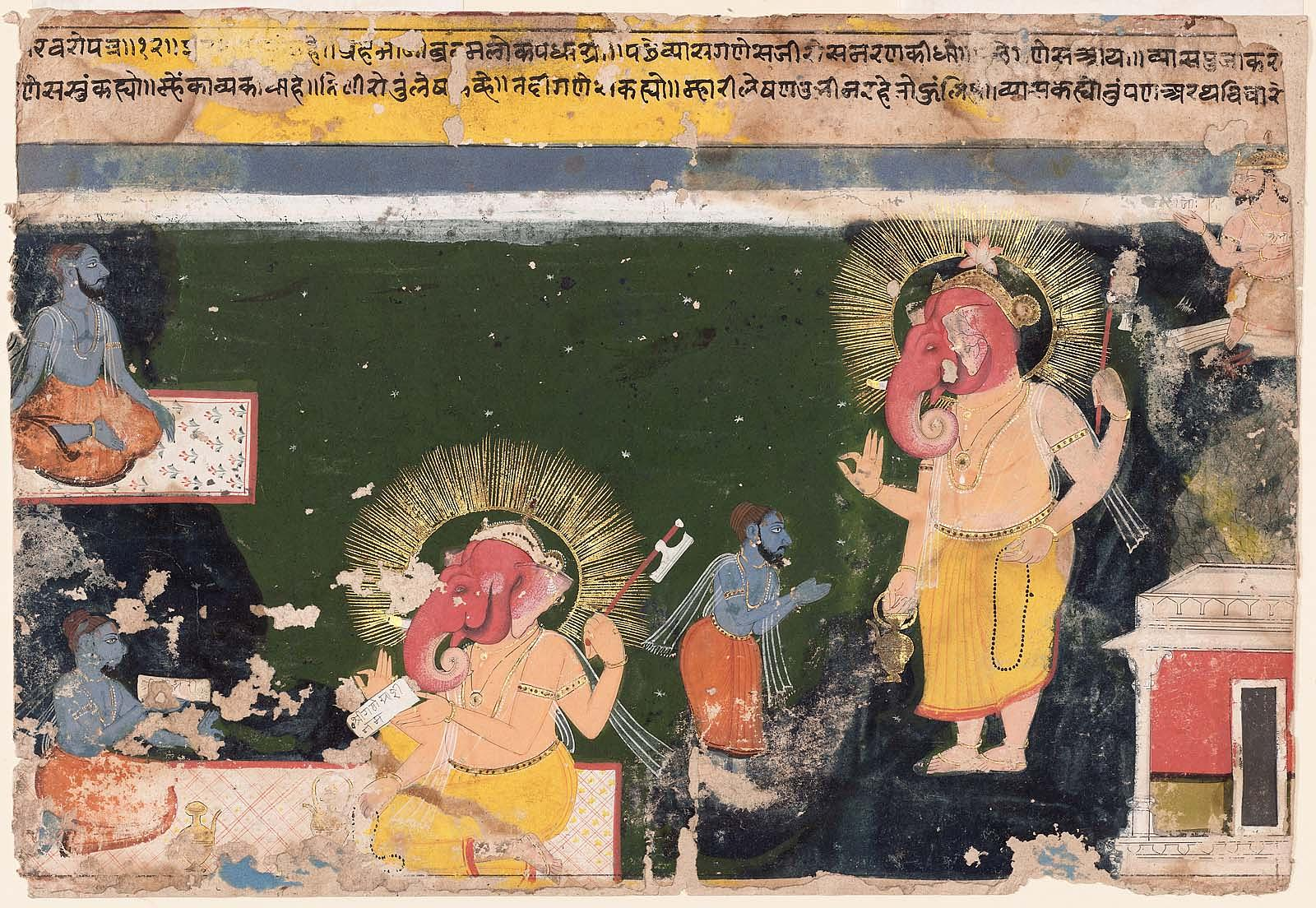
17th-century Rajasthan I manuscript of the Mahabharata depicting Vyasa narrating the Mahabharata to Ganesha, who serves as the scribe

The title "Leader of the group" (Sanskrit: gaṇapati) occurs twice in the Rig Veda, but in neither case does it refer to the modern Ganesha. The term appears in RV 2.23.1 as a title for Brahmanaspati, according to commentators. While this verse doubtless refers to Brahmanaspati, it was later adopted for worship of Ganesha and is still used today. In rejecting any claim that this passage is evidence of Ganesha in the Rig Veda, Ludo Rocher says that it "clearly refers to Bṛhaspati—who is the deity of the hymn—and Bṛhaspati only". Equally clearly, the second passage (RV 10.112.9) refers to Indra, who is given the epithet 'gaṇapati', translated "Lord of the companies (of the Maruts)." However, Rocher notes that the more recent Ganapatya literature often quotes the Rigvedic verses to give Vedic respectability to Ganesha.

The Sangam period Tamil poet Avvaiyar (3rd century BCE), invokes Ganesha while preparing the invitation to the three Tamil Kingdoms for giving away in marriage of Angavay and Sangavay of Ceylon in marriage to the King of Tirucovalur (pp. 57–59).

Two verses in texts belonging to Black Yajurveda, Maitrāyaṇīya Saṃhitā (2.9.1) and Taittirīya Āraṇyaka (10.1), appeal to a deity as "the tusked one" (Dantiḥ), "elephant-faced" (Hastimukha), and "with a curved trunk" (Vakratuṇḍa). These names are suggestive of Ganesha, and the 14th-century commentator Sayana explicitly establishes this identification. The description of Dantin, possessing a twisted trunk (vakratuṇḍa) and holding a corn-sheaf, a sugar cane, and a club, is so characteristic of the Puranic Ganapati that Heras says "we cannot resist to accept his full identification with this Vedic Dantin". However, Krishan considers these hymns to be post-Vedic additions. Thapan reports that these passages are "generally considered to have been interpolated". Dhavalikar says, "the references to the elephant-headed deity in the Maitrāyaṇī Saṃhitā have been proven to be very late interpolations, and thus are not very helpful for determining the early formation of the deity".

Ganesha does not appear in the Indian epic literature that is dated to the Vedic period. A late interpolation to the epic poem Mahabharata (1.1.75–79 (Note: Bombay edition)) says that the sage Vyasa (Vyāsa) asked Ganesha to serve as his scribe to transcribe the poem as he dictated it to him. Ganesha agreed but only on the condition that Vyasa recites the poem uninterrupted, that is, without pausing. The sage agreed but found that to get any rest he needed to recite very complex passages so Ganesha would have to ask for clarifications. The story is not accepted as part of the original text by the editors of the critical edition of the Mahabharata, in which the twenty-line story is relegated to a footnote in an appendix. The story of Ganesha acting as the scribe occurs in 37 of the 59 manuscripts consulted during the preparation of the critical edition. Ganesha's association with mental agility and learning is one reason he is shown as scribe for Vyāsa's dictation of the Mahabharata in this interpolation. Richard L. Brown dates the story to the 8th century, and Moriz Winternitz concludes that it was known as early as c. 900, but it was not added to the Mahabharata some 150 years later. Winternitz also notes that a distinctive feature in South Indian manuscripts of the Mahabharata is their omission of this Ganesha legend. The term vināyaka is found in some recensions of the Śāntiparva and Anuśāsanaparva that are regarded as interpolations. A reference to Vighnakartṛīṇām ("Creator of Obstacles") in Vanaparva is also believed to be an interpolation and does not appear in the critical edition.

=== Puranic period ===
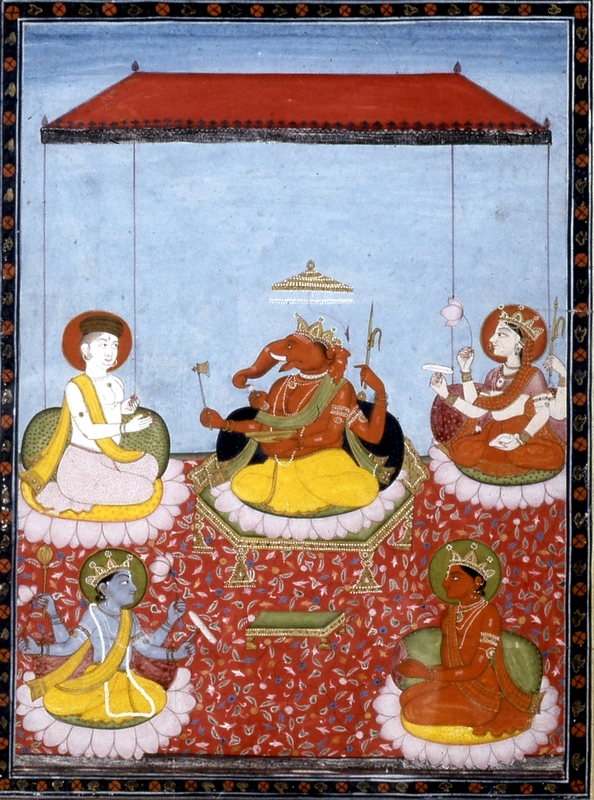
A Ganesha-centric Panchayatana: Ganesha (centre) with Shiva (top left), Devi (top right), Vishnu (bottom left) and Surya (bottom right).

Stories about Ganesha often occur in the Puranic corpus. Brown notes while the Puranas "defy precise chronological ordering", the more detailed narratives of Ganesha's life are in the late texts, c. 600–1300. Yuvraj Krishan says that the Puranic myths about the birth of Ganesha and how he acquired an elephant's head are in the later Puranas, which were composed of c. 600 onwards. He elaborates on the matter to say that references to Ganesha in the earlier Puranas, such as the Vayu and Brahmanda Puranas, are later interpolations made during the 7th-10th centuries.

In his survey of Ganesha's rise to prominence in Sanskrit literature, Ludo Rocher notes that:

Above all, one cannot help being struck by the fact that the numerous stories surrounding Gaṇeśa concentrate on an unexpectedly limited number of incidents. These incidents are mainly three: his birth and parenthood, his elephant head, and his single tusk. Other incidents are touched on in the texts, but to a far lesser extent.

Ganesha's rise to prominence was codified in the 9th century when he was formally included as one of the five primary deities of Smartism. Adi Shankara popularised the "worship of the five forms" (Panchayatana puja) system among orthodox Brahmins of the Smarta tradition. This worship practice invokes the five deities Ganesha, Vishnu, Shiva, Devi, and Surya. Adi Shankara instituted the tradition primarily to unite the principal deities of these five major sects on an equal status. This formalised the role of Ganesha as a complementary deity.

=== Second Millennium CE Scriptures ===
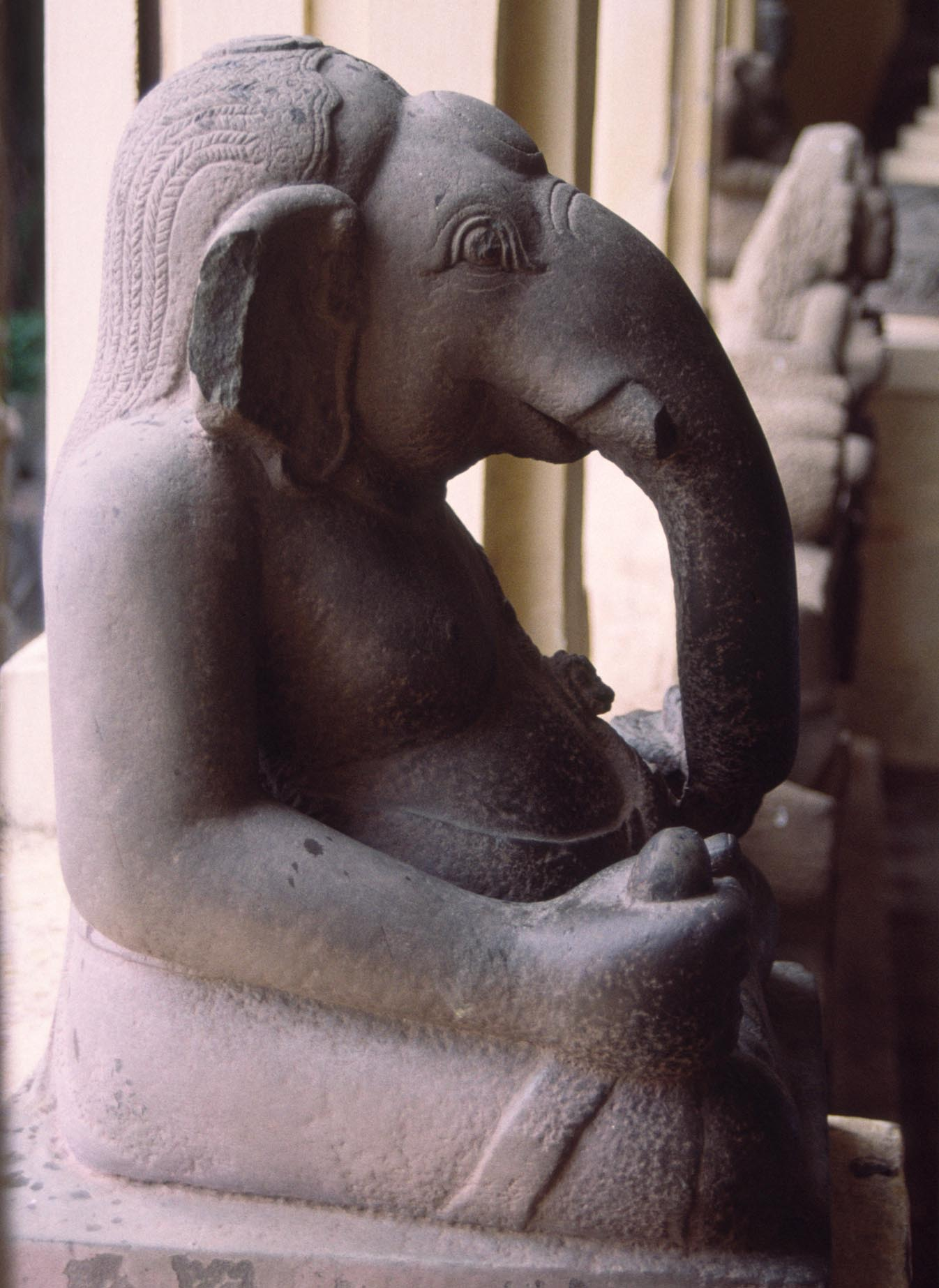
8th-century Ganesha Sculpture in Cham Museum Danang, Central Vietnam

In the Ganapatya tradition founded in the Ganesha Purana and the Mudgala Purana, Ganesha is worshipped as one of the five principle deities along with Siva, Vishnu, the Sun, Ganesha, and the Goddess.

The date of composition for the Ganesha Purana and the Mudgala Purana—and their dating relative to one another—has sparked academic debate. Both works were developed over time and contain age-layered strata. Anita Thapan reviews comment about dating and provide her own judgment. "It seems likely that the core of the Ganesha Purana appeared around the twelfth and thirteenth centuries", she says, "but was later interpolated." Lawrence W. Preston considers the most reasonable date for the Ganesha Purana to be between 1100 and 1400, which coincides with the apparent age of the sacred sites mentioned by the text.

R.C. Hazra suggests that the Mudgala Purana is older than the Ganesha Purana, which he dates between 1100 and 1400. However, Phyllis Granoff finds problems with this relative dating and concludes that the Mudgala Purana was the last of the philosophical texts concerned with Ganesha. She bases her reasoning on the fact that, among other internal evidence, the Mudgala Purana specifically mentions the Ganesha Purana as one of the four Puranas (the Brahma, the Brahmanda, the Ganesha, and the Mudgala Puranas) which deal at length with Ganesha. While the kernel of the text must be old, it was interpolated until the 17th and 18th centuries as the worship of Ganapati became more important in certain regions. Another highly regarded scripture in the Ganapatya tradition, the Sanskrit Ganapati Atharvashirsa, was probably composed during the 16th or 17th century.

The Ganesha Sahasranama is part of the Puranic literature, and is a litany of a thousand names and attributes of Ganesha. Each name in the sahasranama conveys a different meaning and symbolises a different aspect of Ganesha. Versions of the Ganesha Sahasranama are found in the Ganesha Purana.

== Beyond India and Hinduism ==
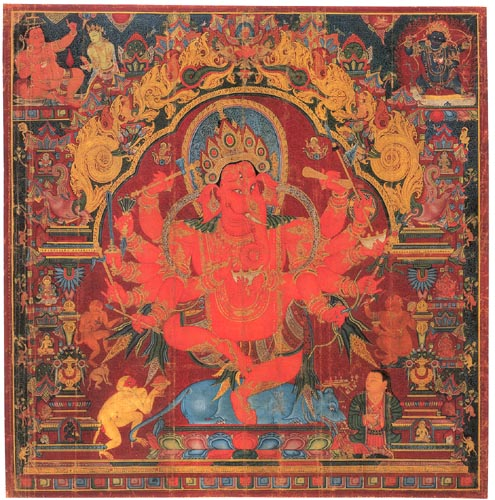
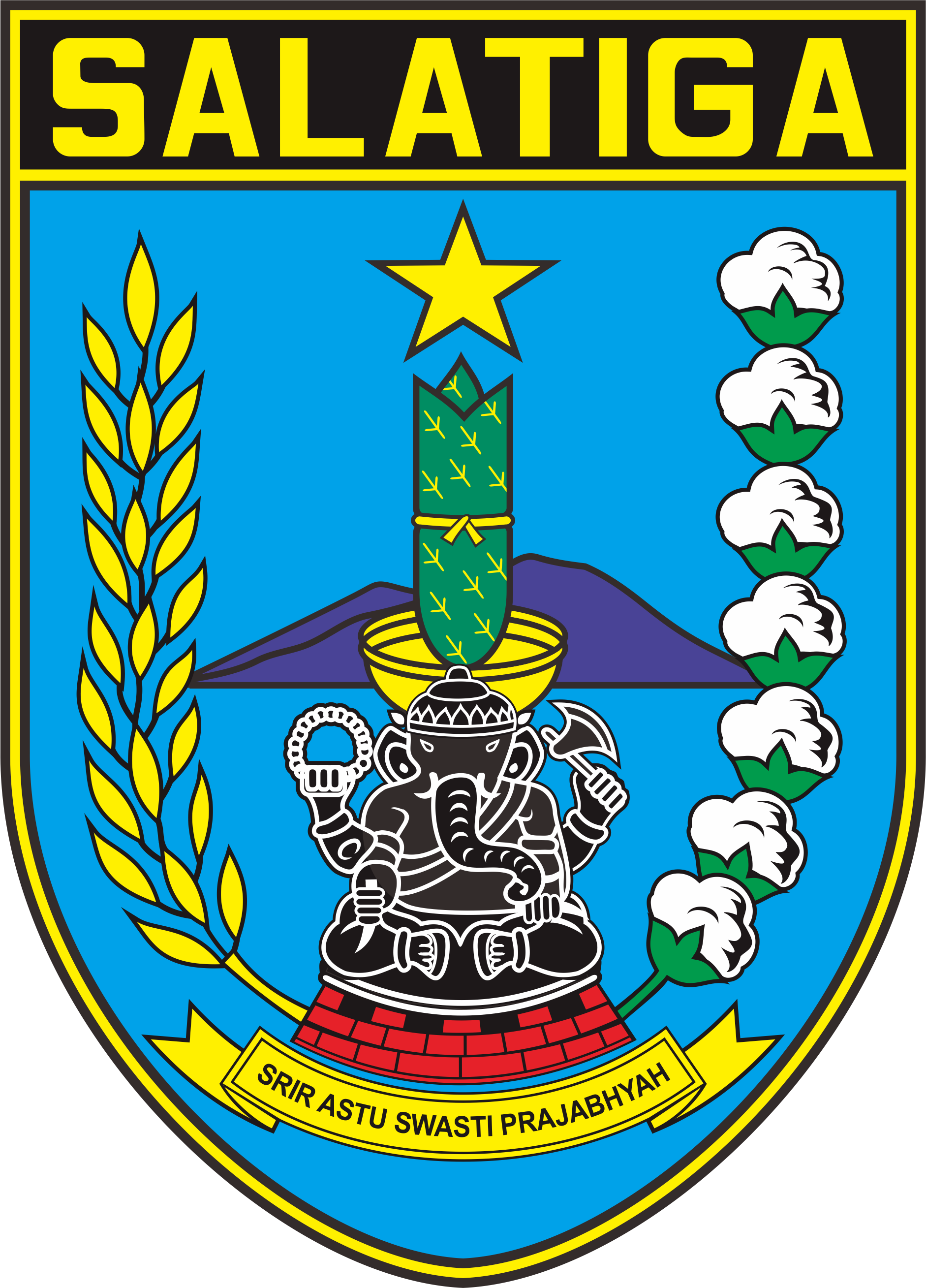
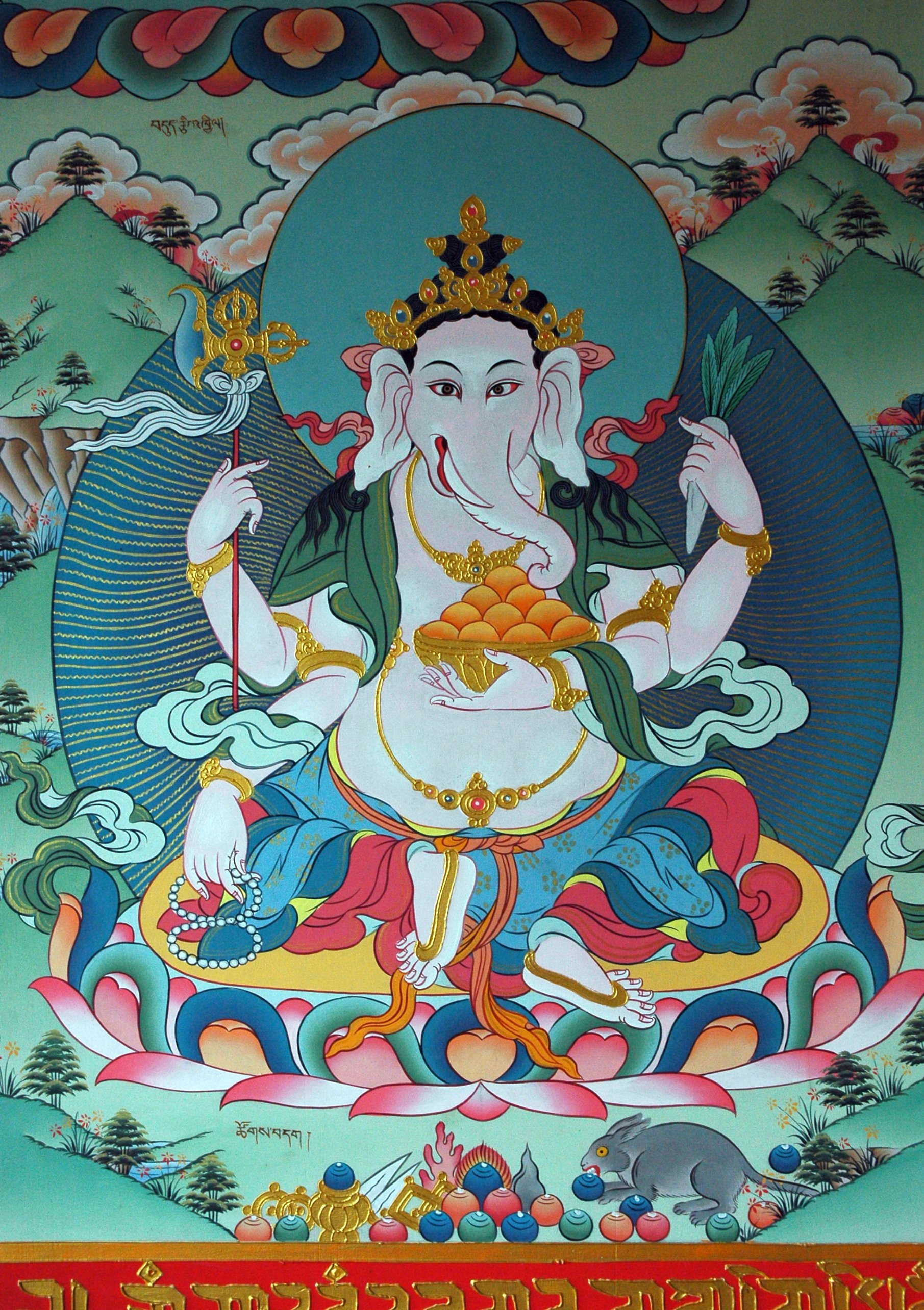
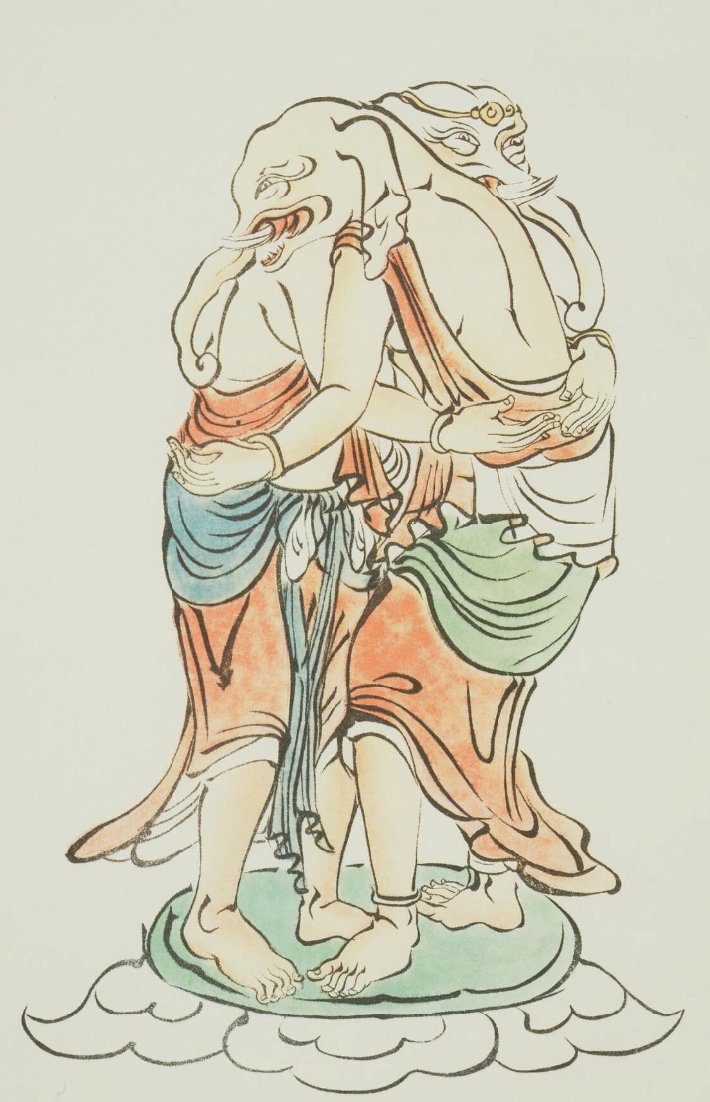
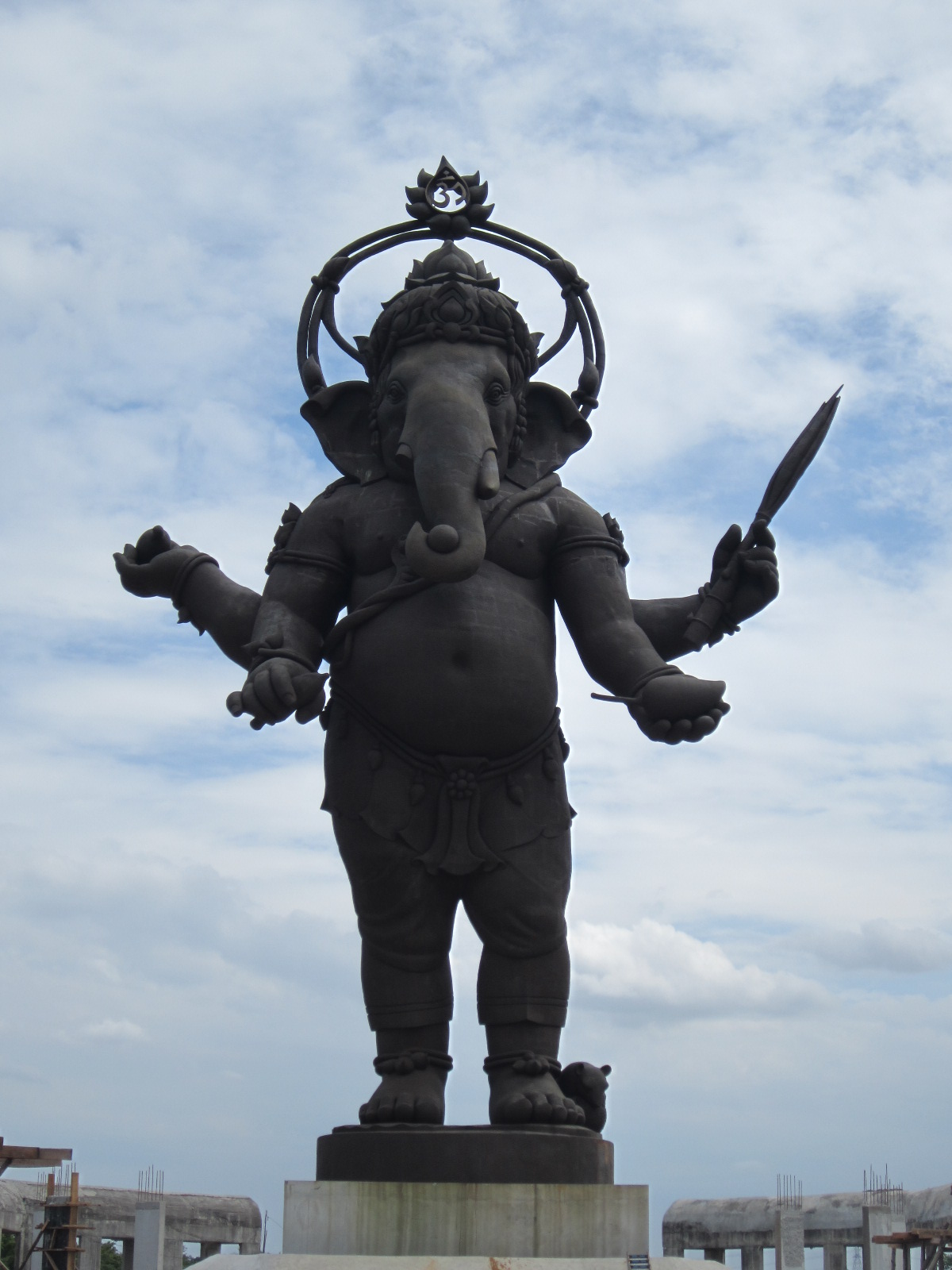
(clockwise from top) Ganesha in Tibet (as Maharakta), Nepal, Thailand, Japan (as Kangiten) and coat of arms of Salatiga, Indonesia.

Commercial and cultural contacts extended India's influence in Western and Southeast Asia. Ganesha is one of a number of Hindu deities who consequently reached foreign lands.

Ganesha was particularly worshipped by traders and merchants, who went out of India for commercial ventures. From approximately the 10th century onwards, new networks of exchange developed including the formation of trade guilds and a resurgence of money circulation. During this time, Ganesha became the principal deity associated with traders. The earliest inscription invoking Ganesha before any other deity is associated with the merchant community.

Hindus migrated to Maritime Southeast Asia and took their culture, including Ganesha, with them. Statues of Ganesha are found throughout the region, often beside Shiva sanctuaries. The forms of Ganesha found in the Hindu art of the Philippines, Java, Bali, and Borneo show specific regional influences. The spread of Hindu culture throughout Southeast Asia established Ganesha worship in modified forms in Burma, Cambodia, and Thailand. In Indochina, Hinduism and Buddhism were practised side by side, and mutual influences can be seen in the iconography of Ganesha in the region. In Thailand, Cambodia, and among the Hindu classes of the Chams in Vietnam, Ganesha was mainly thought of as a remover of obstacles.

Amongst Indonesians who predominantly profess the Islamic faith, Ganesha is not worshipped, but seen as a symbol of knowledge, wisdom and education. Many Indonesian public universities feature Ganesha's likeness in their grounds or logo. Blitar, Salatiga City, and Kediri Regency are among three local governments that include Ganesha in their regency/city official seals. Indonesia is the only country to have featured Ganesha on its banknotes (20 thousand denomination, between 1998 and 2008), although it is no longer in circulation.

Before the arrival of Islam, Afghanistan had close cultural ties with India, and the adoration of both Hindu and Buddhist deities was practised. Examples of sculptures from the 5th to the 7th centuries have survived, suggesting that the worship of Ganesha was then in vogue in the region.

=== In Buddhism ===
Ganesha appears in Mahayana Buddhism, not only in the form of the Buddhist god Vināyaka, but also as a Hindu demon form with the same name. His image appears in Buddhist sculptures during the late Gupta period. As the Buddhist god Vināyaka, he is often shown dancing. This form, called Nṛtta Ganapati, was popular in northern India, later adopted in Nepal, and then in Tibet. In Nepal, the Hindu form of Ganesha, known as Heramba, is popular; he has five heads and rides a lion.

Ganapati (also known as Vinayaka in Buddhism) was adopted as a deity into Indian Vajrayana Buddhism and Ganapati (Tibetan: tshogs bdag) remains a deity in the Tibetan Buddhist pantheon. There are thirty texts contained in the Tibetan Buddhist canon which deal with Ganesha. In these texts, which are Indian texts preserved in Tibetan translation, Ganapati is depicted as a wealth deity which can also grant worldly pleasures like sex and food. He is also depicted as a protector from negative forces, demons, and sickness. In these tantric Buddhist sources, Ganesha is generally presented as an emanation of the Bodhisattva Avalokitesvara.

Ganesha also appears in China and Japan in forms that show distinct regional character. In northern China, the earliest known stone statue of Ganesha carries an inscription dated to 531. In Japan, where Ganesha is known as Kangiten, the Ganesha cult was first mentioned in 806.

Derived from Mahāvināyaka, Ganesha is known as Mahāpeinne (မဟာပိန္နဲ) in Burmese. The worship of Mahāpeinne Nat in Myanmar started around the early Second Ava Period. Konbaung king Mindon Min recognized the Mahapeinne Nat (Ganesh) alongside Thurathati (Sarasvati), Sandi (Dewi), Paramithwa (Siva), and Beithano (Visnu) as Natkyi (နတ်ကြီး) or greater Nat.

Today in Buddhist Thailand, Ganesha is also regarded as a remover of obstacles, and as the god of success. Thailand regards Ganesha mainly as the god of arts and academics. The belief was initiated by King Vajiravudh of the Chakri dynasty who was devoted to Ganesha personally. He even built a Ganesha shrine at his personal palace, Sanam Chandra Palace in Nakhon Pathom Province where he focused on his academic and literary works. His personal belief regarding Ganesha as the god of arts formally became prominent following the establishment of the Fine Arts Department. Today, Ganesha is depicted both in the seal of the Fine Arts Department, and Thailand's first prominent fine arts academy; the Silpakorn University.

=== Jainism ===
The canonical literature of Jainism does not mention the worship of Ganesha. However, Ganesha is worshipped by some Jains, for whom he appears to have taken over certain functions of the god of wealth, Kubera. Jain ties with the trading community support the idea that Jainism took up Ganesha worship as a result of commercial connections and influence of Hinduism. The earliest known Jain Ganesha statue dates to about the 9th century. A 15th-century Jain text lists procedures for the installation of its images. Images of Ganesha appear in some Jain temples of Rajasthan and Gujarat.

== See also ==
- Thirty-two forms of Ganesha – 32 forms of Hindu god Ganesha

== General references ==
- Pal, Pratapaditya (1995). Ganesh, the Benevolent. the University of Michigan: Marg Publications. ISBN 9788185026312.
- Apte, Vaman Shivram (1965). The Practical Sanskrit Dictionary (Fourth revised and enlarged ed.). Delhi: Motilal Banarsidass Publishers. ISBN 978-8120805675.
- Bailey, Greg (1995). Ganeśapurāna: Introduction, translation, notes and index. Harrassowitz. ISBN 978-3447036474.
- Bhattacharyya, Haridas, ed. (1956). The Cultural Heritage of India. Calcutta: The Ramakrishna Mission Institute of Culture. ISBN 9788185843056. Four volumes.
- Brown, Robert (1991), Ganesh: Studies of an Asian God, Albany: State University of New York, ISBN 978-0791406571
- Chinmayananda, Swami (1987), Glory of Ganesha, Bombay: Central Chinmaya Mission Trust, ISBN 978-8175973589
- Courtright, Paul B. (1985), Gaṇeśa: Lord of Obstacles, Lord of Beginnings, New York: Oxford University Press, ISBN 978-0195057423
- Ellawala, H (1969), Social History of Early Ceylon, Colombo: Department of Cultural Affairs.
- Getty, Alice (1936). Gaṇeśa: A Monograph on the Elephant-Faced God (1992 reprint ed.). Oxford: Clarendon Press. ISBN 978-8121503778.
- Grimes, John A. (1995), Ganapati: Song of the Self, SUNY Series in Religious Studies, Albany: State University of New York Press, ISBN 978-0791424407
- Heras, H. (1972), The Problem of Ganapati, Delhi: Indological Book House
- Khokar, Ashish; Saraswati, S. (2005), Ganesha-Karttikeya, New Delhi: Rupa and Co, ISBN 978-8129107763
- Krishan, Yuvraj (1981–1982), "The Origins of Gaṇeśa", Artibus Asiae, 43 (4), Artibus Asiae Publishers: 285–301, doi:10.2307/3249845, JSTOR 3249845
- Krishan, Yuvraj (1999), Gaṇeśa: Unravelling An Enigma, Delhi: Motilal Banarsidass Publishers, ISBN 978-8120814134
- Murthy, K. Krishna (1985), Mythical Animals in Indian Art, New Delhi: Abhinav Publications, ISBN 978-0391032873
- Martin-Dubost, Paul (1965), Gaṇeśa, the Enchanter of the Three Worlds, the University of Michigan: Franco-Indian Research, ISBN 9788190018432
- Mate, M.S. (1962), Temples and Legends of Maharashtra, Bombay: Bharatiya Vidya Bhavan, OCLC 776939647
- Metcalf, Thomas R.; Metcalf, Barbara Daly, A Concise History of India, ISBN 978-0521630276
- Nagar, Shanti Lal (1992). The Cult of Vinayaka. New Delhi: Intellectual Publishing House. ISBN 978-81-7076-044-3.
- Oka, Krishnaji Govind (1913), The Nāmalingānuśāsana (Amarakosha) of Amarasimha: with the Commentary (Amarakoshodghāṭana) of Kshīrasvāmin, Poona: Law Printing Press.
- Ramachandra Rao, S.K. (1992), The Compendium on Gaṇeśa, Delhi: Sri Satguru Publications, ISBN 978-8170308287
- Saraswati, Swami Tattvavidananda (2004), Gaṇapati Upaniṣad, Delhi: D.K. Printworld Ltd., ISBN 978-8124602652
- Śāstri Khiste, Baṭukanātha (1991), Gaṇeśasahasranāmastotram: mūla evaṁ srībhāskararāyakṛta 'khadyota' vārtika sahita, Vārāṇasī: Prācya Prakāśana. Source text with a commentary by Bhāskararāya in Sanskrit.
- Śāstri, Hargovinda (1978), Amarkoṣa with Hindi commentary, Vārānasi: Chowkhambā Sanskrit Series Office
- Thapan, Anita Raina (1997). Understanding Gaṇapati: Insights into the Dynamics of a Cult. New Delhi: Manohar Publishers. ISBN 978-8173041952.
