= Adi Vinayaka =

Form of Ganesha

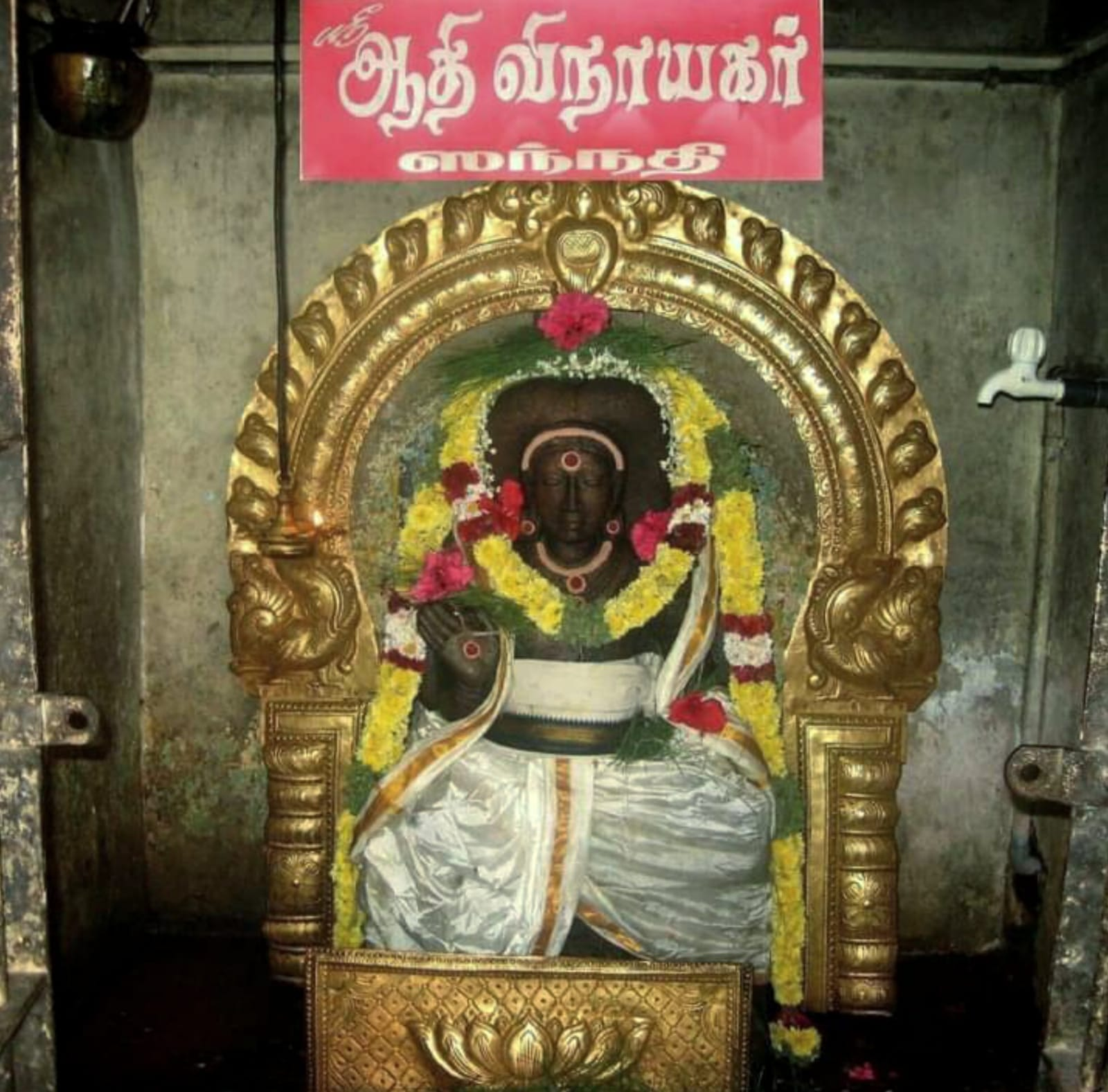
Murti of Adi Vinayaka at Adi Vinayakar Temple, Koothanur, Tamil Nadu

Adi Vinayaka (Sanskrit: आदि विनायक, IAST: Ādi Vināyaka, also known as Nara Mukha Vinayaka) is a form of the Hindu deity Ganesha (Vinayaka), which portrays Ganesha with a human head, prior to his decapitation by his father, Shiva. This form of Ganesha is rarely worshipped, with only a few dedicated shrines, such as the one near Koothanur, Tamil Nadu.

== Etymology ==
Adi Vinayaka derives from the word ādi, literally meaning "first" or "pre-eminent", while Vinayaka is another name of the deity.

Nara Mukha Vinayaka derives from the words nara ("human") and mukha ("face"). "Vinayaka" is a common name for the deity Ganesha.

== Legend ==
According to Hindu mythology, the goddess Parvati, the consort of Shiva, created Ganesha in a wholly human form to guard her while she bathed. When Shiva sought to see his consort, Ganesha refused to allow him to pass. Enraged, Shiva engaged in battle against Ganesha, ultimately beheading him with his trishula. When Parvati learnt of what had transpired, she threatened to disrupt the peace of the three worlds if her son were not restored to life. Shiva sent a number of divinities to procure the head of the first being they came across in the northern region, which happened to be an elephant. With the head of the elephant, Shiva revived Ganesha.
