= Ganapati Atharvaśīrṣa =

Upanishad on Hindu god Ganesha

Ganapati Upanishad
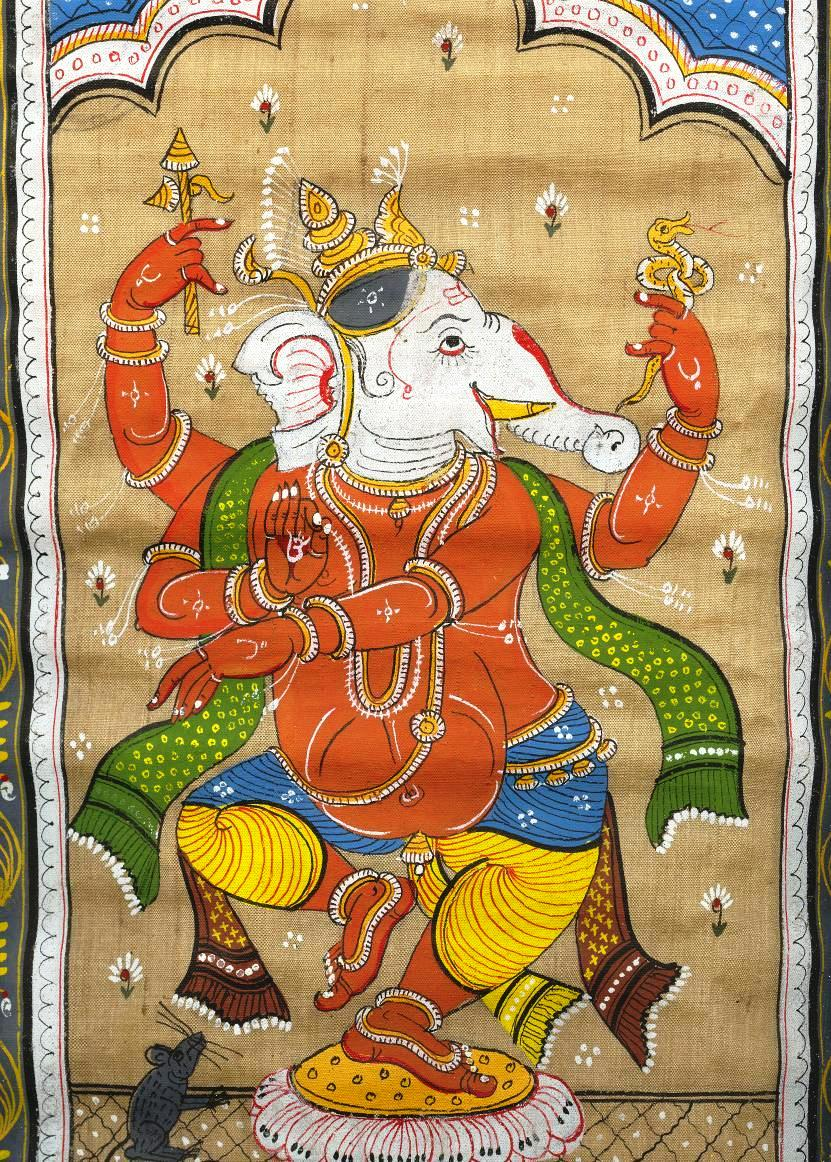
- The text identifies Ganesha to be same as Om, Atman and Brahman
- Devanagari: गणपत्यथर्वशीर्ष
- Linked Veda: Atharvaveda
- Verses: 14
- Philosophy: Vedanta

The Ganapati Atharvasirsha (Sanskrit: गणपत्यथर्वशीर्ष, Gaṇapatyatharvaśīrṣa) is a Sanskrit text and a minor Upanishad of Hinduism. It is a late Upanishadic text dedicated to Ganesha, the deity representing intellect and learning. It asserts that Ganesha is the same as the eternal underlying reality, Brahman. The text is attached to the Atharvaveda, and is also referred to as the Sri Ganapati Atharva Sirsha, the Ganapati Atharvashirsha, the Ganapati Atharvasirsa, or the Ganapati Upanishad.

The text exists in several variants, but with the same message. Ganesha is described to be the same as other Hindu gods, as ultimate truth and reality (Brahman), as satcitananda, as the soul in oneself (Atman) and in every living being, as Om.

== History ==
Ghurye notes that the text identifying Ganesa with the Brahman and is of a very late origin, while Courtright and Thapan date it to the 16th or 17th century.

While the Ganapati Atharvaśīrṣa is a late text, the earliest mention of the word Ganapati is found in hymn 2.23.1 of the 2nd-millennium BCE Rigveda. Ganapati literally means "leader of the multitudes", according to John Grimes, it is, however, unlikely that the Vedic term referred specifically to Ganesha.

The Ganapati Upanishad text is listed at number 89 in the Muktikā canon of 108 Upanishads compiled in the mid-17th century, and also mentioned c. 1800 by Upanishad Brahmayogin in his commentary on the Muktika canon.

== Textual variants ==
The text exists in several versions. A critical edition was published in 1984 by Gudrun Bühnemann with a translation.

A heavily edited and abbreviated translation was made in the early nineteenth century by Vans Kennedy.

J. R. Sartha published a 1969 edition. In 1985 Courtright published an English translation based on the Sartha edition.

Swami Chinmayananda published a variant of the Sanskrit text with an English translation in 1987. In his version of the source text he groups verses together to form sections that he calls upamantras. He notes that as a result of this his line numbering and versification may differ from those given in other variants.

John Grimes provides a structural analysis including a version of the Sanskrit text and an English translation in his 1995 book on Ganapati. His version provides no line numbers.

It is part of the five Atharva Shirsha Upanishads, each of which are named after the five main deities or shrines (panchayatanan of the Smarta tradition) of Ganapati, Narayana, Rudra, Surya and Devi.

== Contents ==
The text opens with the Shanti hymn prelude, or the peace chant, found in many manuscripts of Sanskrit texts.

=== Ganesha as the supreme reality ===
The first verse of the Upanishad proper asserts that Ganesha is the Supreme principle and all pervading metaphysical absolute reality called Brahman in Hinduism. Ganesha is asserted by the text as identical to Om, the Brahman, the Atman or soul, and as the visible manifestation of the Vedic idea Tat tvam asi (you are that) found in the sixth chapter of the Chandogya Upanishad, in a manner similar to Shiva in Shaiva Upanishads, Vishnu in Vaishnava Upanishads, Devi in Shakti Upanishads.

Homage to Lord Gaṇeśa. Oṃ. Reverence to Gaṇapati. You are indeed the visible "That Thou Art" [tattvamasi]. You indeed produce the universe. You indeed sustain it. You indeed destroy it. You indeed are the all pervading reality. You are the manifestation of the eternal self (Brahman).

Chinmayananda translates this verse as follows:

(O Lord Ganapati!) You alone are the visible manifestation of the Essence of the words "That thou art". You alone are the Doer. You alone are the Creator and the Sustainer (of the universe). You alone are the Destroyer. Verily You alone are all this - "idam sarvam" - in the creation, because You are Brahman. You are the Eternal Atman in bodily form."

=== Identification with other deities and with Om ===
Ganesha is the same as Brahma, Vishnu, Shiva, all deities, the universe and the Om. Ganesha, asserts the text, is the Absolute, as well the same soul is each of every living being.

You are Brahmā, Vişņu, and Rudra [Śiva]. You are Agni, Vāyu, and Sūrya. You are Chandrama. You are earth, space, and heaven. You are the manifestation of the mantra "Oṃ".

A variant version of this passage is translated by Chinmayananda as follows:

(O Lord Ganapati!) You are (the Trinity) Brahma, Viṣnu, and Maheśa. You are Indra. You are fire and air. You are the sun and the moon. You are Brahman. You are (the three worlds) Bhuloka, Antariksha-loka, and Swargaloka. You are Om. (that is to say, You are all this).

The verses state Ganesha to be all that is spiritual, the satcitananda, all words, all four levels of speech, all knowledge, all consciousness, the source of all universe, the universe now, that in which the universe will someday be dissolved, the three Guṇas of Samkhya philosophy and what is beyond, all states of being, the truth, the oneness, the contentment, the inner bliss.

=== Integration of Tantra ===
Muladhara Chakra

Some evidence that the work is of late origin which associate Ganapati with the Muladhara chakra:

त्वं मूलाधारस्थितो॑‌सि नि॒त्यम्

You continually dwell in the mūlādhāra chakra.

This text provides a detailed description of Ganesha's bija mantra gaṃ (Sanskrit: गं; gaṃ). When this mantra is written using simplified transliteration methods that do not include diacritical marks to represent nasal sounds, it is written as "gam". This bija mantra is also used in the Ganesha Purana which is generally dated as preceding the Ganapati Atharvasirsa. Courtright translates the passage as follows:

Ganesha Gayatri

एकदन्ताय विद्महे
वक्रतुण्डाय धीमहि
तन्नो दन्तिः प्रचोदयात्

May we know the single tusked one,
May we meditate on the one with the curved trunk,
May that tusked one inspire knowledge and meditation of ours.

— Ganapati Upanishad 8,
Translated by John Grimes

Having uttered the first letter of the word gaṇa, ga, then I utter the nasal sound ṇa which follows and appears beautifully like the crescent moon. This is your form. The ga forms the initial letter, the a forms the middle letter and the ṇa forms the final letter. To utter this sound [i.e., gaṃ] is to utter all sounds together.

=== Gayatri mantra ===
The text includes a Gayatri mantra in verse 8, with Ganesha as the source of inspiration for meditation and knowledge, in Nichṛd Gāyatrī poetic meter. This, states John Grimes, distills the highest human spiritual aspiration. The tooth and trunk in the Ganesha-Gayatri mantra, adds Grimes, embodies symbolism for philosophical and spiritual truths, channeling the attention to physical, intellectual and intuitional self-realization.

== Colophon ==
The text asserts its own status as an upanishad in its final line, which reads "Thus, the Śrī Gaṇapati Atharvaśīrṣa Upanishad"; śrīgaṇapatyatharvaśīrṣopaniṣad). The text associates itself with the Atharvaveda, in a passage that Chinmayananda translates as "Thus says Atharvana" (Sanskrit:इत्यथर्वणवाक्यम्; ityatharvaṇavākyam).

The text ends with the Shanti hymn, states Grimes, "May we be protected together, may we be sustained together, may we do great deeds together, Om, peace, peace, peace!".

== Reception ==
It is the most important surviving Sanskrit text in the Ganapatyas tradition of Hinduism, wherein Ganesha is revered. The entire text is written over the entrance to the temple hall in the aṣtavināyaka Ganesha shrine at Ranjangaon.

== See also ==
- Thirty-two forms of Ganesha
- Atharvashiras Upanishad
- Devi Upanishad
- Mahanarayana Upanishad
- Nirvana Upanishad

== Sources ==
- Coburn, Thomas B. (1991). Encountering the Goddess: A Translation of the Devi-Mahatmya and a Study of Its Interpretation. SUNY Press. ISBN 978-0-7914-0445-4.
- Deussen, Paul (1997). Sixty Upanishads of the Veda. Motilal Banarsidass. ISBN 978-81-208-1467-7.
- Grimes, John A. (1995). Ganapati: Song of the Self. State University of New York Press. ISBN 0-7914-2440-5.
- Hattangadi, Sunder (2004). "श्रीगणपत्यथर्वशीर्षोपनिषत् (Shri Ganapati Atharvasira Upanishad)" (PDF) (in Sanskrit).
- Kennedy, Vans (1831). Researches Into the Nature and Affinity of Ancient and Hindu Mythology. Longmans, Rees, Orme, Brown, and Green. p. 491.
- McDaniel, June (9 July 2004). Offering Flowers, Feeding Skulls : Popular Goddess Worship in West Bengal: Popular Goddess Worship in West Bengal. Oxford University Press, USA. ISBN 978-0-19-534713-5.
