= Vegetarianism in Hinduism =

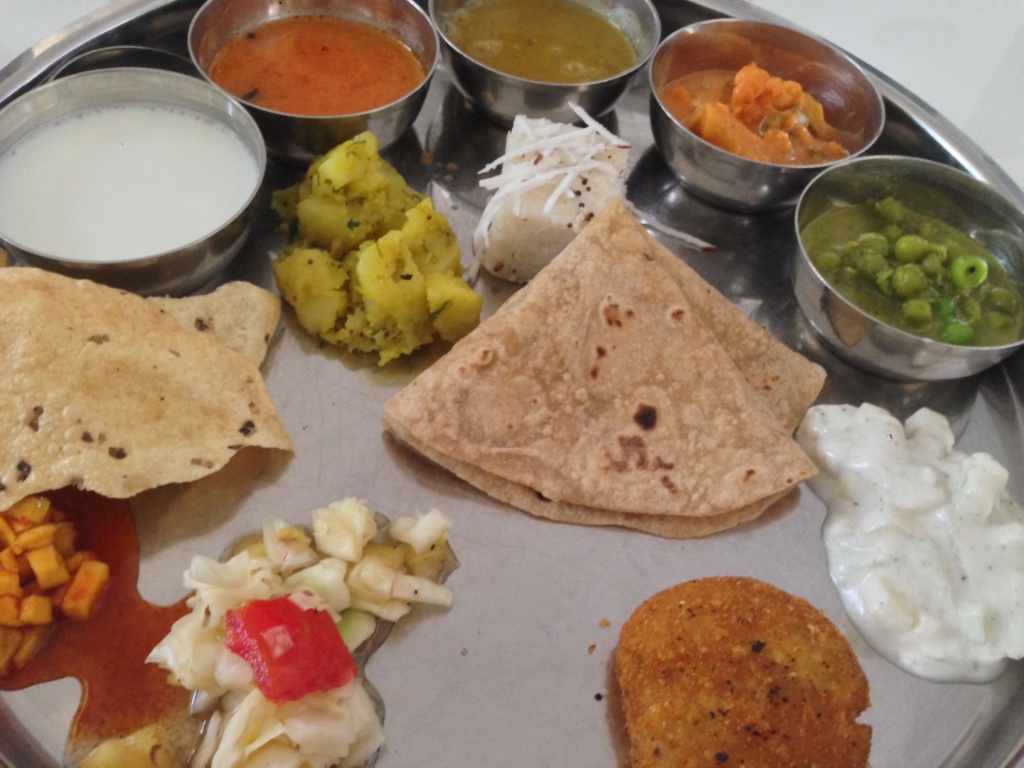
A lacto-vegetarian thali from Indian state of Maharashtra

Vegetarianism in Hinduism is the practice of adhering to a vegetarian diet, a custom which arose in the later stages of the development of Hinduism and gained popularity among the priestly and upper castes due to the influence of Jainism and Buddhism. While religious texts from the Vedic period make numerous references to animal slaughter and consumption in sacrificial contexts, multiple Hindu scriptures composed during the post-Vedic period display a gradual shift towards the promotion of a vegetarian dietary ideal based on the concept of ahimsa—non-violence and compassion towards all beings. According to a Pew Research Center survey, 44% of Hindus self-identify as vegetarian. Within India, the prevalence of vegetarianism among Hindus varies significantly by region and caste, and is often subject to inflation in estimations due to cultural and political pressures.

The Vedic people, whose religion formed the nominal and ideological backbone of Brahmanism, followed a varied diet that included the consumption of meat. Due to the influence of Buddhism and Jainism, the principle of ahimsa evolved and gained importance in the late Vedic era, and was an important factor in the Hindu synthesis that led to the de-emphasis of animal sacrifice in religious rituals (outside of Shakti and Tantric traditions where such practices persist), and the emergence of vegetarian offerings as the preferred alternative. The association of ritual purity with vegetarianism led to the adoption of vegetarian diets by a significant percentage of upper-caste groups.

In modern times, the majority of vegetarian Hindus follow lacto-vegetarian diets, although members of certain Vaishnava sampradayas choose to abstain from onions and garlic as well.

== History ==
Marvin Harris notes the Vedic literature to be contradictory, with some stanzas suggesting ritual slaughter and meat consumption, while others suggesting a taboo on meat eating; however, Hindu literature relating to cow veneration became extremely common in the first millennium CE, and by about 1000 CE, vegetarianism had become a well accepted Hindu tenet. Scholars such as D. N. Jha, Romila Thapar, Juli Gittinger et al. assert that cows were neither inviolable nor revered in the ancient times; the contemporary sacredness was a result of multiple factors including the development of Ahimsa philosophy during the Upanishad spans, opposition to animal killing by Buddhism and Jainism, and increasing influence of Brahminism.

As a result of influence of Jainism and Buddhism, the nascent Hindu-traditions embraced the ideals of non-violence and vegetarianism. By about 200 CE, food and feasting on animal slaughter were widely considered as a form of violence against life forms, and became a religious and social taboo.

== Vegetarianism in Hindu scriptures and texts ==
=== The Vedas ===
Evidence from the Vedas suggests the diet of the Vedic people consisted of cereals, initially barley but later dominated by rice, pulses such as māsha (urad), mudga (moong), and masūra (masoor), vegetables such as lotus roots, lotus stem, bottle gourd and milk products, mainly of cows, but also of buffaloes and goats. The Vedas describe animals including bulls, horses, rams and goats being sacrificed and eaten. Although cows held an elevated position in the Vedas, barren cows were also sacrificed. Even then, the word aghnyā ('not to be eaten', 'inviolable') is used for cows multiple times, with some Rigvedic composers considering the whole bovine species, both cows and bulls, inviolable.

Steven J. Rosen suggests that flesh might have been eaten only as part of ritual sacrifices and not otherwise. Acts of animal sacrifice were not fully accepted since there were signs of unease and tension owing to the 'gory brutality of sacrificial butchery' dating back to as early as the older Vedas. The earliest reference to the idea of ahimsa or non-violence to animals (pashu-ahimsa) in any literature, apparently in a moral sense, is found in the Kapisthala Katha Samhita of the Yajurveda (KapS 31.11), written about the 8th century BCE. The Shatapatha Brahmana contains one of the earliest statements against eating flesh, and the Chāndogya Upaniṣad, has an injunction against killing 'all living entities'. Injunctions against flesh-eating also appear in the Dharmasutras.

Vegetarianism in ancient India
In that country they do not keep pigs and fowls, and do not sell live cattle; in the markets there are no butchers' shops and no dealers in intoxicating drink.

— Faxian, Chinese pilgrim to India (4th/5th century CE)

=== Dharmaśāstras ===
According to P. V. Kane, one who is about to eat food should greet the food when it is served to him, should honour it, never speak ill, and never find fault in it.

The Dharmasastra literature, states Patrick Olivelle, admonishes "people not to cook for themselves alone", offer it to the gods, to forefathers, to fellow human beings as hospitality and as alms to the monks and needy. Olivelle claims all living beings are interdependent in matters of food and thus food must be respected, worshipped and taken with care. Olivelle states that the Shastras recommend that when a person sees food, he should fold his hands, bow to it, and say a prayer of thanks.

The reverence for food reaches a state of extreme in the renouncer or monk traditions in Hinduism. The Hindu tradition views procurement and preparation of food as necessarily a violent process, where other life forms and nature are disturbed, in part destroyed, changed and reformulated into something edible and palatable. The mendicants (sannyasin, ascetics) avoid being the initiator of this process, and therefore depend entirely on begging for food that is left over of householders. In pursuit of their spiritual beliefs, states Olivelle, the "mendicants eat other people's left overs". If they cannot find left overs, they seek fallen fruit or seeds left in field after harvest.

The forest hermits of Hinduism, on the other hand, do not beg for left overs. Their food is wild and uncultivated. Their diet would consist mainly of fruits, roots, leaves, and anything that grows naturally in the forest. They avoided stepping on plowed land, lest they hurt a seedling. They attempted to live a life that minimizes, preferably eliminates, the possibility of harm to any life form.

==== Manusmriti ====
The Manusmriti's discussion on flesh-eating contains 25 verses condemning the consumption of flesh, bracketed by 3 verses defending the practice in the context of Vedic sacrifices. Commentators starting with Medhātithi interpret the verses to mean that flesh-eating is prohibited generally, and only permitted in the presence of mitigating circumstances, such as danger to life.

One can never obtain meat without causing injury to living beings... he should, therefore, abstain from meat. Reflecting on how meat is obtained and on how embodied creatures are tied up and killed, he should quit eating any kind of meat... The man who authorises, the man who butchers, the man who slaughters, the man who buys or sells, the man who cooks, the man who serves, and the man who eats – these are all killers. There is no greater sinner than a man who, outside of an offering to gods or ancestors, wants to make his own flesh thrive at the expense of someone else's.

— Manusmriti, 5.48-5.52, translated by Patrick Olivelle

=== Mahabharata ===
The Mahabharata contains numerous stories glorifying non-violence towards animals and has some of the strongest statements against slaughter of animals—three chapters of the epic are dedicated to the evils of flesh-eating. Bhishma declares compassion to be the highest religious principle, and compares eating of animal flesh to eating the flesh of one's son. Nominally acknowledging Manu's authorisation of flesh-eating in sacrificial context, Bhisma explains to Yudhishthira that "one who abstains from doing so acquires the same merit as that accrued from the performance of even a horse sacrifice" and that "those desirous of heaven perform sacrifice with seeds instead of animals". It is stated in Mahabharata that animal sacrifices were introduced only when people began to resort to violence in the treta yuga, a less pure and compassionate age, and were not present in the satya yuga, 'the golden age'.

=== Tirukkuṛaḷ ===
The Tirukkuṛaḷ, a Tamil text of Hindu or Jain origin from ca. 500 CE, emphasizes ahimsa and insists on moral vegetarianism or veganism. Originally written in the South Indian language of Tamil, the text states moderate diet as a virtuous lifestyle and criticizes "non-vegetarianism" in its Pulaan Maruthal (abstinence from flesh or meat) chapter, through verses 251 through 260. Verse 251, for instance, questions "how can one be possessed of kindness, who, to increase his own flesh, eats the flesh of other creatures." It also says that "the wise, who are devoid of mental delusions, do not eat the severed body of other creatures" (verse 258), suggesting that "flesh is nothing but the despicable wound of a mangled body" (verse 257). It continues to say that not eating flesh is a practice more sacred than the most sacred religious practices ever known (verse 259) and that only those who refrain from killing and eating the kill are worthy of veneration (verse 260). This text, written before 400 CE, and sometimes called the Tamil Veda, discusses eating habits and its role in a healthy life (Mitahara), dedicating Chapter 95 of Book II to it. The Tirukkuṛaḷ states in verses 943 through 945, "eat in moderation, when you feel hungry, foods that are agreeable to your body, refraining from foods that your body finds disagreeable". Valluvar also emphasizes overeating has ill effects on health, in verse 946, as "the pleasures of health abide in the man who eats moderately. The pains of disease dwell with him who eats excessively."

=== Puranas ===
The Puranic texts fiercely oppose violence against animals in many places "despite following the pattern of being constrained by the Vedic imperative to nominally accept it in sacrificial contexts". The most important Puranic text, the Bhagavata Purana goes farthest in repudiating animal sacrifice—refraining from harming all living beings is considered the highest dharma. The text states that the sin of harming animals cannot be washed away by performing "sham sacrifices", just as "mud cannot be washed away by mud". It graphically presents the horrific karmic reactions accrued from the performance of animal sacrifices—those who mercilessly cook animals and birds go to kumbhipaka and are fried in boiling oil and those who perform sham sacrifices are themselves cut to pieces in viśasana hell. The Skanda Purana states that the sages were dismayed by animal sacrifice and considered it against dharma, claiming that sacrifice is supposed to be performed with grains and milk. It narrates that animal sacrifice was only permitted to feed the population during a famine, yet the sages did not slaughter animals even as they died of starvation. The Matsya Purana contains a dialogue between sages who disapprove of violence against animals, preferring rites involving oblations of fruits and vegetables. The text states that the negative karma accrued from violence against animals far outweighs any benefits.

== Vegetarianism and caste ==
Among Hindus, the norms with regards to what a person may consume and with whom should they gather for a meal depends on their caste. A distinction traditionally exists between vegetarian and non-vegetarian castes. Most Brahmin and merchant castes were usually vegetarian, and a vegetarian diet was considered ritually purer. Dominant castes that held a monopoly on power, such as Rajputs, tended to be non-vegetarian, and a non-vegetarian diet was seen as necessary for the exercise of power through force.

M. N. Srinivas and other subsequent authors developed the idea of Sanskritisation, arguing that marginalised individuals and communities adopt vegetarianism in order to gain prestige or improve their status in the caste hierarchy. Amit Desai criticised the thesis as a "misreading of the significance of vegetarianism", arguing that vegetarianism among the subaltern groups is "not necessarily derivative of an elite worldview" but rather rooted in subaltern experience itself and that it addresses problems meaningful within their own lived worlds.

Viktor Pál and Iris Borowy write, "Some Dalit groups worldwide take consumption of beef as a marker of Dalit cultural identity and organise beef-festivals to preserve it, inviting the wrath of most upper-caste Hindus globally. Food-based perceptions and caste are thus inextricably interlinked concepts establishing hierarchies in food, denigrating and dehumanising the 'others.'"

== Modern Hindu vegetarianism ==
According to a 2021 Pew Research Center survey, 44% of Hindus say they are vegetarian, and another 39% restrict their consumption of flesh in some way. Data from the National Family Health Survey in 2019-20 showed that in over half of the 30 States/ UTs analysed, more than 90% of the population (with Hindus ranging around 80%) consumed fish, chicken, or meat daily, weekly or occasionally. In 25 of them, the figure was more than 50%.

Steven J. Rosen cautions that "it is nearly impossible to reach an accurate conclusion" on the prevalence of flesh consumption, given that competing social pressures—aspirational associations with Western modernity on one hand, and caste-based prestige on the other—produce distortions in self-reporting.

=== Lacto-vegetarian diet ===
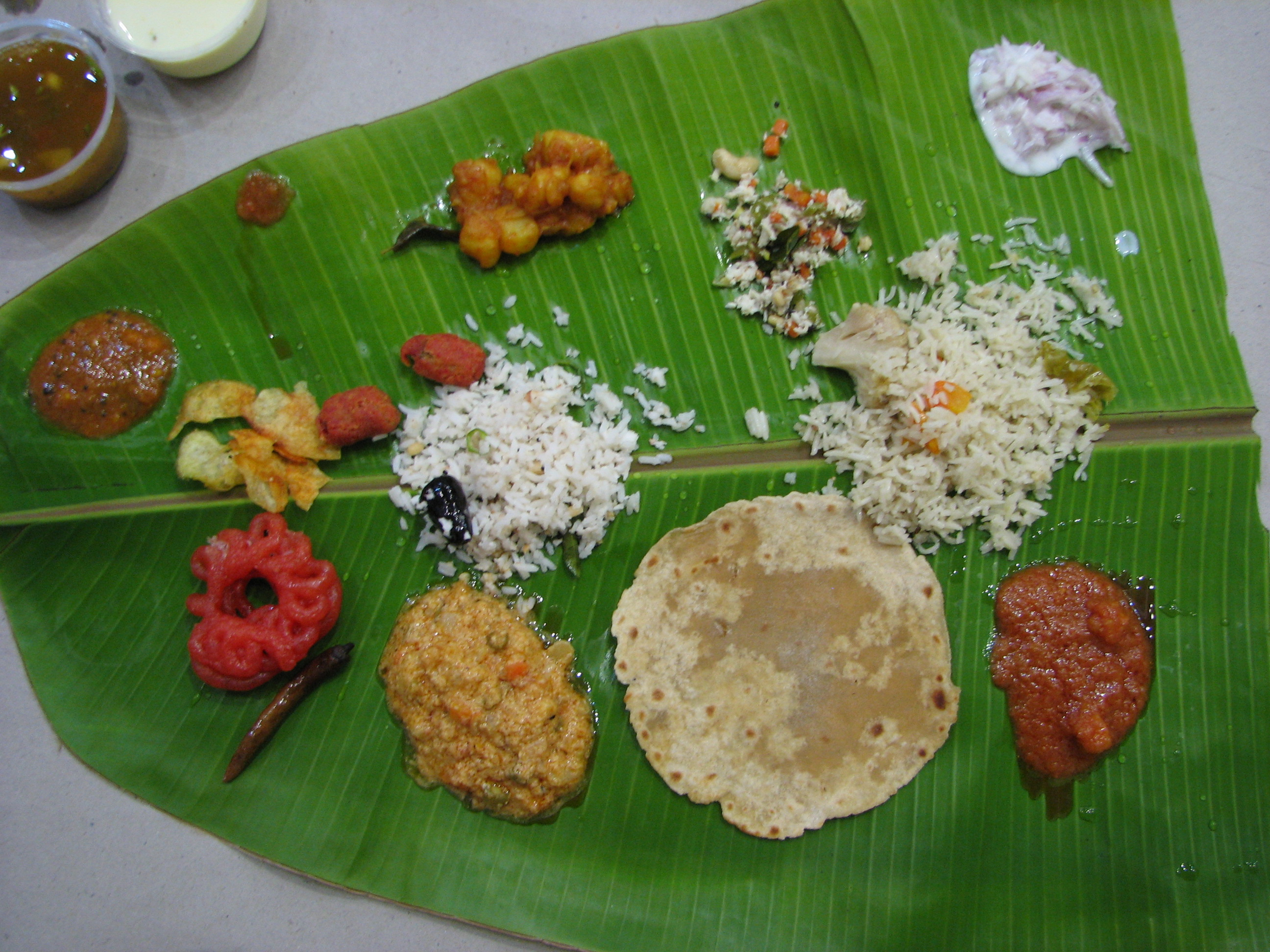
A Hindu, lacto-vegetarian meal served on a banana leaf

Vegetarianism is a dietary ideal among many Hindus, based on the concept of ahimsa—non-violence and compassion towards all beings. It is also considered sattvic, associated with qualities such as goodness, balance, and serenity that are conducive to spiritual progress.

Lacto-vegetarianism is favoured by many Hindus; the diet includes milk-based foods and all non-animal derived foods, but excludes meat and eggs. Reasons for adopting such a diet include the principle of nonviolence (ahimsa) applied to animals, the intention to offer only vegetarian food to a Hindu's preferred deity and then to receive it back as prasāda, and the conviction that non-vegetarian food is detrimental for the mind and for spiritual development.

A typical modern urban Hindu lacto-vegetarian meal is based on a combination of grains such as rice and wheat, legumes, green vegetables, and dairy products. Depending on the geographical region, the staples may also include millet-based flatbreads. Fat derived from slaughtered animals is avoided.

A number of Hindus, particularly those following the Vaishnava tradition, refrain from eating onions and garlic, either totally or during the Chaturmasya period (roughly July to November of the Gregorian calendar). In Maharashtra, some Hindu families do not eat any eggplant preparations during this period either. Followers of the International Society for Krishna Consciousness (ISKCON) abstain from meat, fish, and fowl. Members of the related Pushtimargi sect also avoid certain vegetables such as onion, mushrooms, and garlic out of the belief that these are tamasic (producing dullness, lethargy, and inertia). The mainly Gujarati Swaminarayan movement staunchly adheres to a diet devoid of meat, eggs, seafood, onions, and garlic.

=== Non-vegetarian diet ===
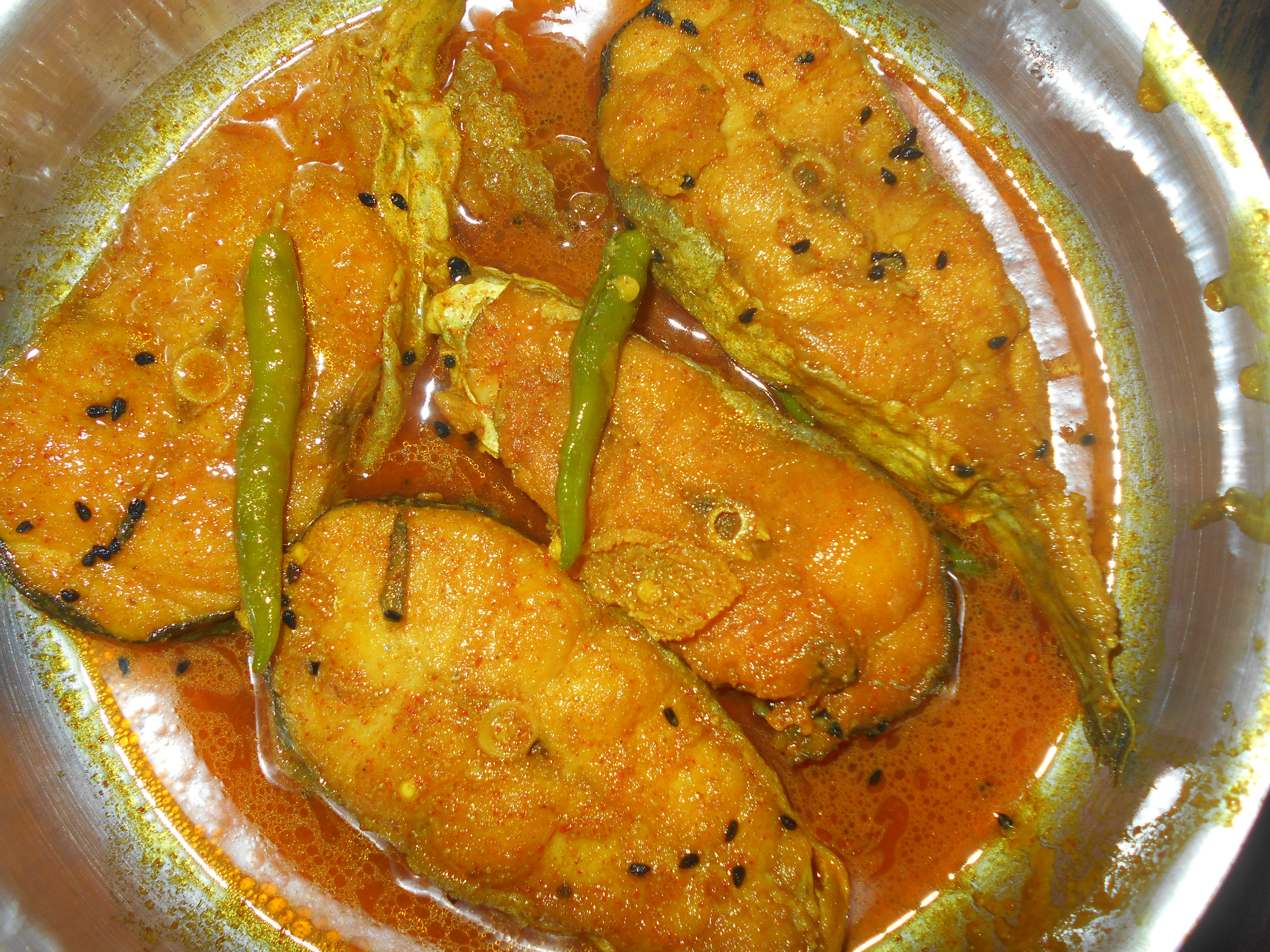
Machher Jhol is a spicy fish stew, notably in Bengali and Odia cuisines in the eastern part of the Indian subcontinent.

A significant portion of Hindus are non-vegetarians, although even those who identify as non-vegetarian eat very little meat. India has significantly lower meat consumption than other regions of the world. Non-vegetarian Indians mostly prefer poultry, fish, other seafood, goat, and sheep as their sources of meat. In Eastern and coastal south-western regions of India, fish and seafood are the staple of most of the local communities. As cows are considered sacred, many Hindus avoid eating the flesh of cows, and view this restriction as essential; in the Pew Research Center survey, 72% of Hindus said that those who do not follow this restriction cannot be Hindu.

=== Diet for religious observations and festivals ===
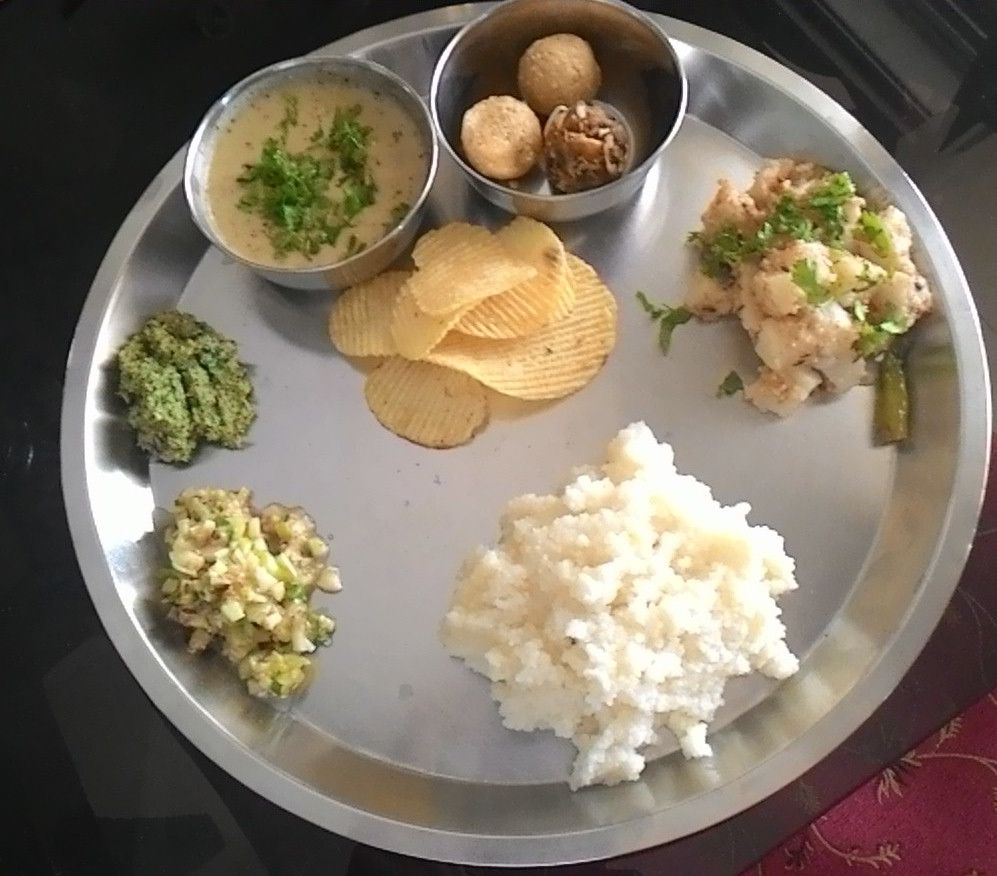
Hindu fasting day lunch menu

The Hindu calendar has many festivals and religious observances, and dishes specific to that festival are prepared.

==== Prasāda and Naivedya ====
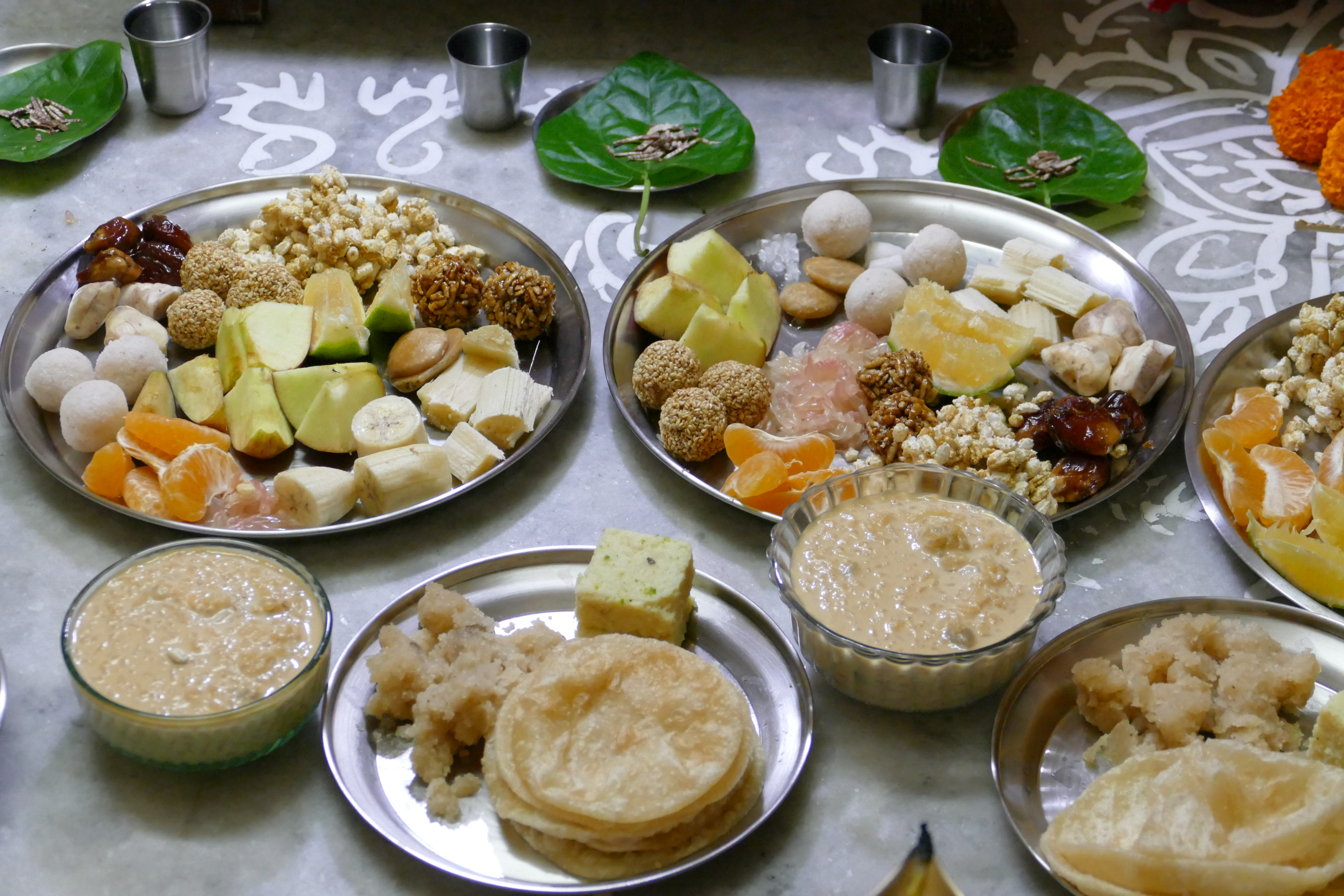
Prasada offered during Puja ceremony at a home in West Bengal, India

A material offering to a deity is called naivedya, 'offering of food', it is tasted by the deity and becomes bhoga, 'tasted', and the food is then returned as a gift and distributed among the devotees as prasāda; these terms are often used interchangeably. Vaiṣṇava and Śaiva offerings are typically vegetarian, whereas some Śākta practices include non-vegetarian offerings, involving animal sacrifices.

==== Festival dishes ====
Hindus prepare special dishes for different festivals. Kheer and Halwa are two desserts popular for Diwali. Puran poli and Gujia are prepared for Holi in different parts of India.

==== Diet on fasting days ====
Hindu people fast on certain days such as Ekadashi, in honour of Vishnu or his avatars: Chaturthi in honour of Ganesha, Pradosha in honour of Shiva and Parvati, Monday in honour of Shiva, Saturday in honour of Hanuman or Shani, Tuesday in honour of Hanuman, as well as Kali, Parvati, Kartikeya, and Ganesha, Sunday in honour of Surya, Thursday in honour of Vishnu or his avatars, Dattatreya, and Brihaspati, Wednesday in honour of Krishna, Vithoba, Ganesha and Budha and Friday in honour of Mahadevi, Durga, Kali, Mariamman, Lakshmi, Sita, Radha, Rukmini, Saraswati, and Santoshi Mata. Only certain kinds of food are allowed to be eaten during the fasting period. These include milk and other dairy products such as curd, fruit and starchy Western food items such as sago, potatoes, purple-red sweet potatoes, amaranth seeds, nuts and shama millet. Popular fasting dishes include Farari chevdo, Sabudana Khichadi or peanut soup.

== Hindu nationalism ==
Modern meat eating among Hindus has been complicated by Hindu nationalists. It has created tensions among upper caste Hindus and lower caste Dalits, and also with Muslims and Christians. Hindu nationalists tend to present Hindu society as purely vegetarian while presenting Muslims as non-vegetarian in order to marginalise them.

The government of India since 2014, under the Hindu nationalist Bharatiya Janata Party has pushed vegetarianism.

Hindu nationalist Rashtriya Swayamsevak Sangh (RSS), upholds pure vegetarianism and views vegetarianism as integral religious purity of the Hindus. Similarly, the BJP does not allow meat in their events.

== See also ==
- Buddhist cuisine
- Buddhist vegetarianism
- Christian dietary laws
- Diet in Sikhism
- Customs and etiquette in Indian dining
- Indian vegetarian cuisine
- Islamic dietary laws
- Kashrut (Jewish Dietary Laws)
- List of diets
- Vegetarian cuisine
- Vegetarian Diet Pyramid
- Vegetarianism and religion
