= Names of Durga =

List of names of Durga

In Hindu mythology, the goddess Durga has 108 names. The following is a list of the names:

== List of names ==
Sanskrit Name	Transliteration	Mantra (Sanskrit)	Mantra (Roman)	Name Meaning
सती	Satī	ॐ सत्यै नमः	Om Satyai Namaḥ	One who is virtuous/true
साध्वी	Sādhvī	ॐ साध्व्यै नमः	Om Sādhvyai Namaḥ	The virtuous one
भवप्रीता	Bhavaprītā	ॐ भवप्रीतायै नमः	Om Bhavaprītāyai Namaḥ	Loved by Bhava (Shiva)
भवानी	Bhavānī	ॐ भवान्यै नमः	Om Bhavānyai Namaḥ	The abode of the universe/Consort of Shiva
भवमोचनी	Bhavamocanī	ॐ भवमोचन्यै नमः	Om Bhavamocanyai Namaḥ	Liberator from worldly bondage
आर्या	Āryā	ॐ आर्यायै नमः	Om Āryāyai Namaḥ	Noble Goddess
दुर्गा	Durgā	ॐ दुर्गायै नमः	Om Durgāyai Namaḥ	The invincible
जया	Jayā	ॐ जयायै नमः	Om Jayāyai Namaḥ	The victorious
आद्या	Ādyā	ॐ आद्यायै नमः	Om Ādyāyai Namaḥ	The primordial
त्रिनेत्रा	Trinetrā	ॐ त्रिनेत्रायै नमः	Om Trinetrāyai Namaḥ	She with three eyes
शूलधारिणी	Śūladhāriṇī	ॐ शूलधारिण्यै नमः	Om Śūladhāriṇyai Namaḥ	Holder of the trident
पिनाकधारिणी	Pinākadhāriṇī	ॐ पिनाकधारिण्यै नमः	Om Pinākadhāriṇyai Namaḥ	Holder of Shiva's bow
चित्रा	Citrā	ॐ चित्रायै नमः	Om Citrāyai Namaḥ	Picturesque/Wonderful
चंद्रघंटा	Candraghaṇṭā	ॐ चंद्रघंटायै नमः	Om Candraghaṇṭāyai Namaḥ	She with a moon-shaped bell
महातपा	Mahātapā	ॐ महातपायै नमः	Om Mahātapāyai Namaḥ	Of great penance
मन	Mana	ॐ मनायै नमः	Om Manāyai Namaḥ	Embodiment of mind
बुद्धि	Buddhi	ॐ बुद्ध्यै नमः	Om Buddhyai Namaḥ	Intelligence
अहंकारा	Ahaṅkārā	ॐ अहंकारायै नमः	Om Ahaṅkārāyai Namaḥ	Ego personified
चित्तरूपा	Cittarūpā	ॐ चित्तरूपायै नमः	Om Cittarūpāyai Namaḥ	Form of pure thought
चिता	Citā	ॐ चितायै नमः	Om Citāyai Namaḥ	Thought/Mind
चिति	Citi	ॐ चितये नमः	Om Citaye Namaḥ	Awareness/Consciousness
सर्वमंत्रमयी	Sarvamantramayī	ॐ सर्वमंत्रमय्यै नमः	Om Sarvamantramayyai Namaḥ	Possessor of all mantras
सत्ता	Sattā	ॐ सत्तायै नमः	Om Sattāyai Namaḥ	Existence
सत्यानंदस्वरूपिणी	Satyānandasvarūpiṇī	ॐ सत्यानंदस्वरूपिण्यै नमः	Om Satyānandasvarūpiṇyai Namaḥ	Form of eternal truth and bliss
अनंता	Anantā	ॐ अनंतायै नमः	Om Anantāyai Namaḥ	Infinite
भाविनी	Bhāvinī	ॐ भाविन्यै नमः	Om Bhāvinyai Namaḥ	The beautiful woman/Creator
भव्या	Bhavyā	ॐ भव्यायै नमः	Om Bhavyāyai Namaḥ	Worthy/Splendid
अभव्या	Abhavyā	ॐ अभव्यायै नमः	Om Abhavyāyai Namaḥ	Incomprehensible/Immeasurable
सदगति	Sadagati	ॐ सदगतये नमः	Om Sadagataye Namaḥ	Bestower of right path
शाम्भवी	Śāmbhavī	ॐ शाम्भव्यै नमः	Om Śāmbhavyai Namaḥ	Consort of Shambhu (Shiva)
देवमाता	Devamātā	ॐ देवमात्रे नमः	Om Devamātre Namaḥ	Mother of the gods
चिंता	Cintā	ॐ चिंतायै नमः	Om Cintāyai Namaḥ	Contemplation
रत्नप्रिया	Ratnapriyā	ॐ रत्नप्रियायै नमः	Om Ratnapriyāyai Namaḥ	Lover of jewels
सर्वविद्या	Sarvavidyā	ॐ सर्वविद्यायै नमः	Om Sarvavidyāyai Namaḥ	All knowledge
दक्षकन्या	Dakṣakanyā	ॐ दक्षकन्यायै नमः	Om Dakṣakanyāyai Namaḥ	Daughter of Daksha
दक्षयज्ञविनाशिनी	Dakṣayajñavināśinī	ॐ दक्षयज्ञविनाशिन्यै नमः	Om Dakṣayajñavināśinyai Namaḥ	Destroyer of Daksha's sacrifice
अपर्णा	Aparṇā	ॐ अपर्णायै नमः	Om Aparṇāyai Namaḥ	The one who fasted without leaves
अनेकवर्ण	Anekavarṇā	ॐ अनेकवर्णायै नमः	Om Anekavarṇāyai Namaḥ	Of many colors
पाटला	Pāṭalā	ॐ पाटलायै नमः	Om Pāṭalāyai Namaḥ	The red-complexioned
पाटलावती	Pāṭalāvatī	ॐ पाटलावत्यै नमः	Om Pāṭalāvatyai Namaḥ	Wearing red garments
पट्टाम्बरपरिधाना	Paṭṭāmbaraparidhānā	ॐ पट्टाम्बरपरिधानायै नमः	Om Paṭṭāmbaraparidhānāyai Namaḥ	Wearing silk garments
कलमञ्जीरञ्जिनी	Kalamanjarīranjinī	ॐ कलमञ्जीरञ्जिन्यै नमः	Om Kalamanjaīranjinyai Namaḥ	Delighting in tinkling anklets
अमेयविक्रमा	Ameyavikramā	ॐ अमेयविक्रमायै नमः	Om Ameyavikramāyai Namaḥ	Of boundless valor
क्रूरा	Krūrā	ॐ क्रूरायै नमः	Om Krūrāyai Namaḥ	Fierce to evil
सुंदरी	Sundarī	ॐ सुंदर्यै नमः	Om Sundaryai Namaḥ	The beautiful one
सुरसुंदरी	Surasundarī	ॐ सुरसुंदर्यै नमः	Om Surasundaryai Namaḥ	Most beautiful among celestial beings
वनदुर्गा	Vanadurgā	ॐ वनदुर्गायै नमः	Om Vanadurgāyai Namaḥ	Goddess of the forest
मातंगी	Mātaṅgī	ॐ मातंग्यै नमः	Om Mātaṅgyai Namaḥ	The goddess Matangi
मतंगमुनीपूजिता	Mataṅgamunipūjitā	ॐ मतंगमुनीपूजितायै नमः	Om Mataṅgamunipūjitāyai Namaḥ	Worshipped by Sage Matanga
ब्राह्मी	Brāhmī	ॐ ब्राह्म्यै नमः	Om Brāhmyai Namaḥ	Power of Brahma
माहेश्वरी	Māheśvarī	ॐ माहेश्वर्यै नमः	Om Māheśvaryai Namaḥ	Power of Shiva
ऐंद्राणी	Aindrāṇī	ॐ ऐंद्राण्यै नमः	Om Aindrāṇyai Namaḥ	Power of Indra
कौमारी	Kaumārī	ॐ कौमार्यै नमः	Om Kaumāryai Namaḥ	Power of Kumara
वैष्णवी	Vaiṣṇavī	ॐ वैष्णव्यै नमः	Om Vaiṣṇavyai Namaḥ	Power of Vishnu
चामुंडा	Cāmuṇḍā	ॐ चामुंडायै नमः	Om Cāmuṇḍāyai Namaḥ	Slayer of Chanda and Munda
वाराही	Vārāhī	ॐ वाराह्यै नमः	Om Vārāhyai Namaḥ	Power of Varaha
लक्ष्मी	Lakṣmī	ॐ लक्ष्म्यै नमः	Om Lakṣmyai Namaḥ	Goddess of prosperity
पुरुषाकृति	Puruṣākṛti	ॐ पुरुषाकृत्यै नमः	Om Puruṣākṛtyai Namaḥ	Taking cosmic human form
विमला	Vimalā	ॐ विमलायै नमः	Om Vimalāyai Namaḥ	Pure
उत्कर्षिणी	Utkarṣiṇī	ॐ उत्कर्षिण्यै नमः	Om Utkarṣiṇyai Namaḥ	Inspiring progress
ज्ञाना	Jñānā	ॐ ज्ञानायै नमः	Om Jñānāyai Namaḥ	Knowledge
क्रिया	Kriyā	ॐ क्रियायै नमः	Om Kriyāyai Namaḥ	Action
नित्या	Nityā	ॐ नित्यायै नमः	Om Nityāyai Namaḥ	Eternal
बुद्धिदा	Buddhidā	ॐ बुद्धिदायै नमः	Om Buddhidāyai Namaḥ	Bestower of wisdom
बहुला	Bahulā	ॐ बहुलायै नमः	Om Bahulāyai Namaḥ	Abundant
बहुलप्रिया	Bahulapriyā	ॐ बहुलप्रियायै नमः	Om Bahulapriyāyai Namaḥ	Beloved by all
सर्ववाहनवाहना	Sarvavāhanavāhanā	ॐ सर्ववाहनवाहनायै नमः	Om Sarvavāhanavāhanāyai Namaḥ	Rider of all vehicles
निशुंभशुंभहननी	Niśumbhaśumbhahananī	ॐ निशुंभशुंभहनन्यै नमः	Om Niśumbhaśumbhahananyai Namaḥ	Slayer of demons Nishumbha and Shumbha
महिषासुरमर्दिनी	Mahiṣāsuramardinī	ॐ महिषासुरमर्दिन्यै नमः	Om Mahiṣāsuramardinyai Namaḥ	Slayer of buffalo demon Mahishasura
मधुकैटभहंत्री	Madhukaiṭabhahantrī	ॐ मधुकैटभहंत्र्यै नमः	Om Madhukaiṭabhahantryai Namaḥ	Slayer of Madhu and Kaitabha demons
चंडमुंडविनाशिनी	Caṇḍamuṇḍavināśinī	ॐ चंडमुंडविनाशिन्यै नमः	Om Caṇḍamuṇḍavināśinyai Namaḥ	Slayer of demons Chanda and Munda
सर्वसुरविनाशा	Sarvasuravināśā	ॐ सर्वसुरविनाशायै नमः	Om Sarvasuravināśāyai Namaḥ	Destroyer of evil forces
सर्वदानवघातिनी	Sarvadānavaghātinī	ॐ सर्वदानवघातिन्यै नमः	Om Sarvadānavaghātinyai Namaḥ	Slayer of all demons
सर्वशास्त्रमयी	Sarvaśāstramayī	ॐ सर्वशास्त्रमय्यै नमः	Om Sarvaśāstramayyai Namaḥ	Embodiment of all scriptures
सत्या	Satyā	ॐ सत्यायै नमः	Om Satyāyai Namaḥ	Truth
सर्वास्त्रधारिणी	Sarvāstradhāriṇī	ॐ सर्वास्त्रधारिण्यै नमः	Om Sarvāstradhāriṇyai Namaḥ	Wielder of all missile weapons
अनेकशस्त्रहस्ता	Anekaśastrahastā	ॐ अनेकशस्त्रहस्तायै नमः	Om Anekaśastrahastāyai Namaḥ	Holder of numerous weapons
अनेकास्त्रधारिणी	Anekāstradhāriṇī	ॐ अनेकास्त्रधारिण्यै नमः	Om Anekāstradhāriṇyai Namaḥ	Bearer of numerous missiles
कुमारी	Kumārī	ॐ कुमार्यै नमः	Om Kumāryai Namaḥ	Young girl
एककन्या	Ekakanyā	ॐ एककन्यायै नमः	Om Ekakanyāyai Namaḥ	The incomparable maiden
कैशोरी	Kaiśorī	ॐ कैशोर्यै नमः	Om Kaiśoryai Namaḥ	Adolescent maiden
युवती	Yuvatī	ॐ युवत्यै नमः	Om Yuvatyai Namaḥ	Young woman
यति	Yati	ॐ यत्यै नमः	Om Yatyai Namaḥ	Ascetic
अप्रौढ़ा	Aprauḍhā	ॐ अप्रौढ़ायै नमः	Om Aprauḍhāyai Namaḥ	Youthful
प्रौढ़ा	Prauḍhā	ॐ प्रौढ़ायै नमः	Om Prauḍhāyai Namaḥ	Mature woman
वृद्धमाता	Vṛddhamātā	ॐ वृद्धमात्रे नमः	Om Vṛddhamātre Namaḥ	Ancient Mother
बलप्रदा	Balapradā	ॐ बलप्रदायै नमः	Om Balapradāyai Namaḥ	Bestower of strength
महोदरी	Mahodarī	ॐ महोदर्यै नमः	Om Mahodaryai Namaḥ	Holding the universe in her belly
मुक्तकेशी	Muktakeśī	ॐ मुक्तकेश्यै नमः	Om Muktakeśyai Namaḥ	One with unbound hair
घोररूपा	Ghorarūpā	ॐ घोररूपायै नमः	Om Ghorarūpāyai Namaḥ	Formidable form
महाबला	Mahābalā	ॐ महाबलायै नमः	Om Mahābalāyai Namaḥ	Possessing great strength
अग्निज्वाला	Agnijvālā	ॐ अग्निज्वालायै नमः	Om Agnijvālāyai Namaḥ	Blazing like fire
रौद्रमुखी	Raudramukhī	ॐ रौद्रमुख्यै नमः	Om Raudramukhyai Namaḥ	Fierce-faced
कालरात्रि	Kālarātri	ॐ कालरात्र्यै नमः	Om Kālarātryai Namaḥ	Dark night of dissolution
तपस्विनी	Tapasvinī	ॐ तपस्विन्यै नमः	Om Tapasvinyai Namaḥ	Ascetic woman
नारायणी	Nārāyaṇī	ॐ नारायण्यै नमः	Om Nārāyaṇyai Namaḥ	Consort of Narayana
भद्रकाली	Bhadrakālī	ॐ भद्रकाल्यै नमः	Om Bhadrakālyai Namaḥ	Auspicious Kali
विष्णुमाया	Viṣṇumāyā	ॐ विष्णुमायायै नमः	Om Viṣṇumāyāyai Namaḥ	Cosmic illusion of Vishnu
जलोदरी	Jalodarī	ॐ जलोदर्यै नमः	Om Jalodaryai Namaḥ	Abode of primordial waters
शिवदूती	Śivadūtī	ॐ शिवदूत्यै नमः	Om Śivadūtyai Namaḥ	One who sent Shiva as messenger
कराली	Karālī	ॐ कराल्यै नमः	Om Karālyai Namaḥ	Formidable/Opening wide
अनंता	Anantā	ॐ अनंतायै नमः	Om Anantantāyai Namaḥ	Boundless
परमेश्वरी	Parameśvarī	ॐ परमेश्वर्यै नमः	Om Parameśvaryai Namaḥ	Supreme goddess
कात्यायनी	Kātyāyanī	ॐ कात्यायन्यै नमः	Om Kātyāyanyai Namaḥ	Daughter of Sage Katyayana
सावित्री	Sāvitrī	ॐ सावित्र्यै नमः	Om Sāvitryai Namaḥ	Solar goddess/Daughter of Savitr
प्रत्यक्षा	Pratyakṣā	ॐ प्रत्यक्षायै नमः	Om Pratyakṣāyai Namaḥ	The manifest one
ब्रह्मवादिनी	Brahmavādinī	ॐ ब्रह्मवादिन्यै नमः	Om Brahmavādinyai Namaḥ	One who speaks of Brahman
