= Uchchhishta =

Hindu/Indian concept about contamination of food by saliva

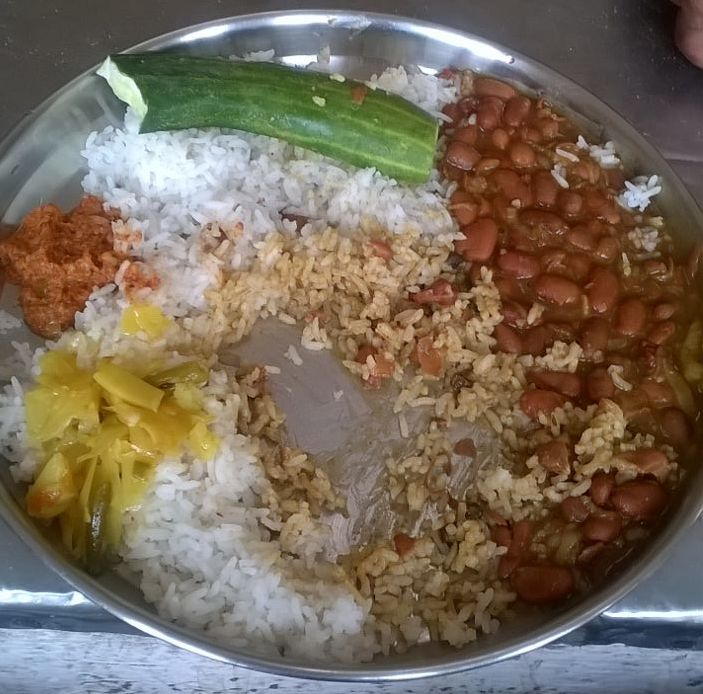
A partially-eaten plate of Indian food. The food on the plate is called Uchchhishta (noun). The plate is said to be Uchchhishta (adjective).

Uchchhishta (Sanskrit: उच्छिष्ट, IAST: Ucchiṣṭa, pronounced [ʊtːɕʰɪʂʈɐ]), known by various regional terms, is an Indian and a Hindu concept related to the contamination of food by saliva. Though the term has various meanings and has no exact parallel in English, it is generally translated in English as "leftovers" or "leavings", but with a denigratory aspect. Uchchhishta frequently denotes the food scraps remaining after a person has eaten. In a broader sense, it refers to the contamination of a food or hand that has come in contact with saliva or the inside of the mouth. A person or plate is said to be uchchhishta after coming into contact with uchchhishta food. Uchchhishta food, people and utensils are considered to be ritually impure. A person can become purified by washing their hand (Hindus traditionally eat with their fingers) and mouth.

It is highly disrespectful to offer uchchhishta food to someone, however exceptions exist for food from socially superior individuals, and others. While such offerings to Hindu divinities are forbidden in classical Hinduism, some heterodox Tantric deities are worshipped with the offering.

== Concept ==
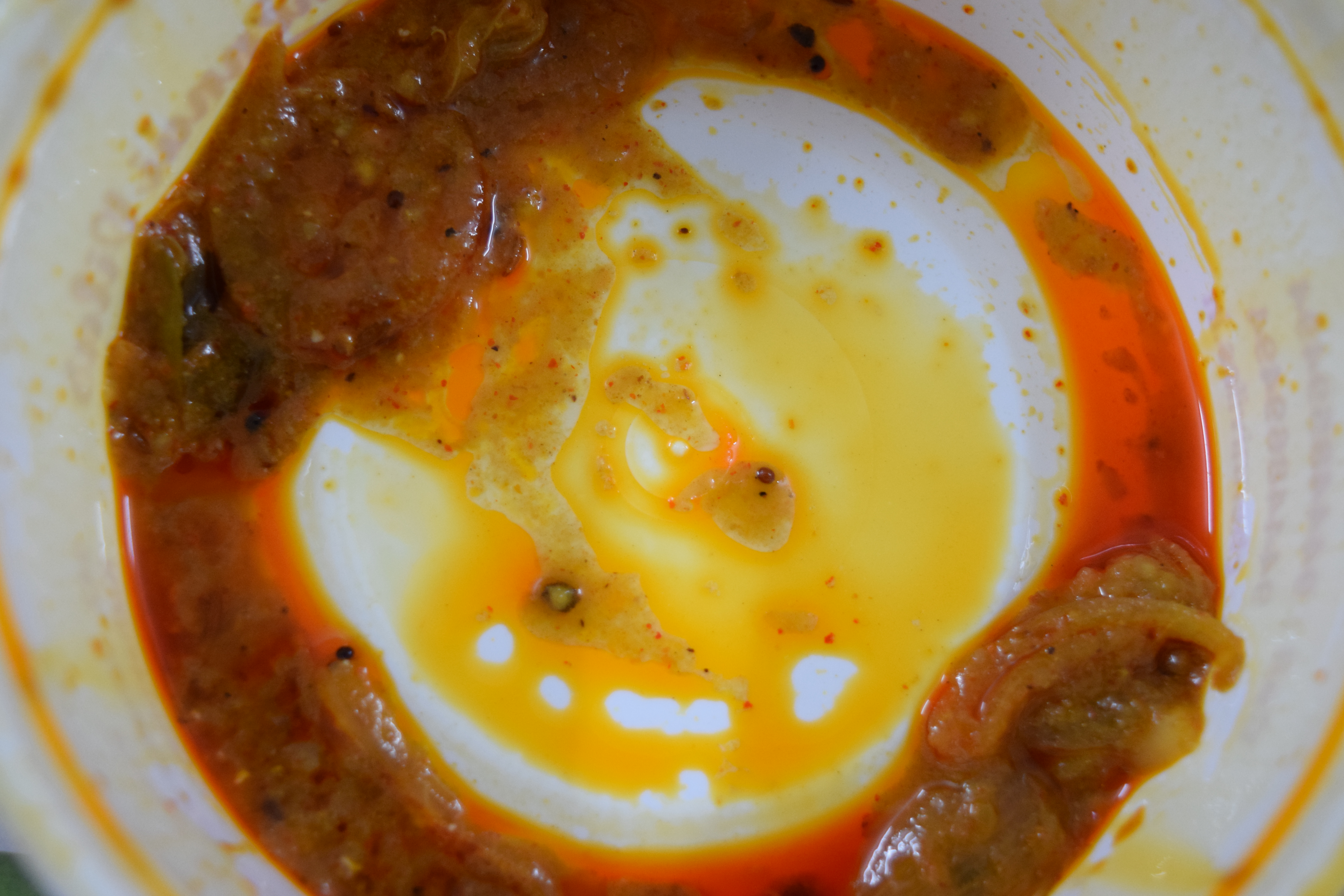
Leftovers of an Indian curry on a plate. The leftovers are called uchchhishta (noun); the plate is described as uchchhishta (adjective)

The Monier-Williams Sanskrit dictionary defines uchchhishta as: "left, rejected, stale, spit out of the mouth (as remnants of food); one who has still the remains of food in the mouth or hands, one who has not washed his hands and mouth and therefore is considered impure, impure; leavings, fragments, remainder (especially of a sacrifice or of food)".

Medhatithi (c. 850–1050 CE), one of the oldest and most famous commentators of the Hindu law book Manusmriti lists the meanings of uchchhishta:

- Primary meaning: contamination by food or hand that has come in contact the inside of someone's mouth
- Pollution due to contact with "the eater, the eaten food" or the plate on which someone has eaten
- leftover food on someone's plate, after he has eaten
- leftover food in the serving vessel after everyone is served
- a person who has passed human waste, before purification

While uchchhishta is related to leftovers and contact with saliva, uchchhishta should be differentiated from other terms also translated in English as "impure": Amedhya ("unfit for sacrifice") refers to contamination by contact to human waste, corpses, decomposition etc. and malina ("stained") refers to pollution by physical dirt.

Like other bodily substances like sweat, saliva is considered to be part of body and also not part of it, that is, of "uncertain status". Thus, contact with saliva, uchchhishta, is regarded as impure. The Manusmriti however does not regard saliva defiling in general, but only in the food context. Drops of saliva, which transmit from one person to another while speaking, are not treated impure.

The precept of not contaminating all the food or a drink with bacteria or viruses in one's saliva is of particular concern as the health of someone could be threatened through cross contamination.

A medieval Siddhar mocks the concept of uchchhishta. He questions how are the flowers offered to Hindu deities or honey not defiled by saliva of bees and the cow's milk by the saliva of the calf.

== Regional names ==
- eñjalu/ucchiṣṭa (ಎಂಜಲು/ಉಚ್ಛಿಷ್ಟ) – Kannada
- engili (ఎంగిలి) – Telugu
- eccil (எக்சில்) – Tamil
- juṭhā/jhuṭhā (जूठा) – HindiBengali
- jũṭh (जूंठ) - Rajasthani
- khoṭu/chũṭ (ખોટુ/ચૂંટ) - Gujarati
- ushṭa (उष्ट) – Marathi; the term is used in the extended meaning of "used or enjoyed by others", e.g., a speech is described as ushta, if it is a plagiarism.
- eccil/ucchishṭam (എച്ചിൽ/ഉച്ഛിഷ്ടം ) – Malayalam
- saṅkhaṟḍ̠ā/åĩṭhā (ସଙ୍ଖଡ଼ା/ଅଇଁଠା) – Odia
- ẽṭh (ঐংঠ/ऐंठ) - Maithili
- eṭboss (এঠো) – Bengali
- maḍe (ಮಡೇ) – Tulu

== Rules ==
Uchchhista is generally regarded as highly polluting and impure in Hinduism. Hindus view Uchchhista with revulsion. Eating Uchchhista is considered as humiliating; a Kannada proverb says that he is a dog who eats Uchchhista. Offering Uchchhista to a higher caste member is considered as his insult.

People usually do not dip, serve or accept food with the fingers or cutlery that has touched someone's mouth. While cooking also, the cook does not taste food and use the same utensil to stir the food. Once food is tasted with a utensil, it is put away to wash. Food which has been dipped with fingers and cutlery used for eating is considered Uchchhista. While sharing or eating dry food or fruits, the food is portioned so that it does not become contaminated by someone's saliva. For the same reason, Hindus do not generally drink from each other's water glasses.

In the early 20th century, use of spoons or forks and metal plates were not used by orthodox Hindus as they had come in contact with one's mouth and thus could not be reused as they remained Uchchhista, even though cleaned. One-use leaf plates were preferred; Hindus traditionally eat with their fingers, without cutlery.

Uchchhishta is acceptable to be eaten by socially inferior individuals: one's servants, lower caste persons, beggars and animals. "Untouchables" including Castes handling human waste historically used to live on leftovers. Eating someone's Uchchhista is seen as a sign of submission and acceptance of the person's superiority.

In modern India, the rules of Uchchhista are relaxed in the cases of intimacy of a couple or a family. Eating the uchchhishta food of a young child by his parents is also acceptable, as the child is not regarded a fully-grown separate individual. Parents usually feed young children from their own plate.

In contrast of the general negative connotations associated with it, eating some types of Uchchhista like of a husband by a wife, of a guru by the student and of a sacrifice or divine offering by all, is highly regarded. Prasad, food offered to a deity and having "eaten" by the deity, is sometimes considered the Uchchhista of the gods, as in some parts of North India; however other times as in parts of South India, the comparison of the sacred prasad to Uchchhista, is frowned upon.

A husband is considered equivalent to God for a Hindu wife. As such, wife can eat his Uchchhista as a sign of her love and submission. The wife may eat in the same leaf as the husband's, after he finishes. The husband will leave some food in his plate for her to eat, as a symbol of his love. The custom is ritually performed first at the time of marriage. This act is said to signify her integration in her new family. It is also acceptable if the wife eats the Uchchhista of her in-laws or her husband's brothers.

The Apastamba Dharmasutra (1st-millennium BCE), while describing the code of conduct for a student, refers to the concept of uchchhishta. In ancient times, a student would stay with a teacher (guru) in the latter's house (Gurukula) and learn. In this period, a student should ask for alms for his livelihood, which he should not consider as uchchhishta. A student is prescribed to not leave any food uneaten in his plate, that is, leave no uchchhishta. However, if any uchchhishta remains, he should bury it, throw it in the water or give it away to a Shudra (a member from the lower social strata). The student is prescribed to eat the uchchhishta of his guru, which are regarded as sacred as a sacrificial oblation. Eating uchchhishta of one's father or brother is also acceptable. The Vasishtha Dharmasutra regards the Uchchhista of the guru, equivalent to medicine that an ill student should have. In the Guru Stotram, it is said that the Guru is equivalent to the Trimurti, hence, for the student, it is considered as taking prasadam.

Exceptions to uchchhishta are given in the Vasishtha Dharmasutra. Food remnants stuck in teeth or food currently in the mouth are not considered impure, as they are treated part of the mouth like teeth. Swallowing the same cleanses the individual. While pouring water for someone to drink, if drops of water fall on the person's feet; the drops are not Uchchhista, but considered part of the ground.

The concept of uchchhishta focuses on purification by washing one's hands and mouth after eating. The cleansing is extended to the kitchen so that so no trace of uchchhishta or cooking of the meal before, is left.

== Association with Hindu deities ==
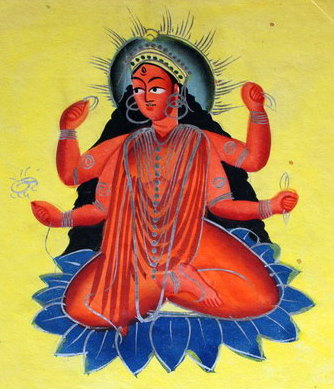
The Hindu goddess Matangi is offered the taboo uchchhishta food by the devotee in the ritually impure uchchhishta state, with unwashed mouth and hands.

Offering uchchhishta food to Hindu deities or worship by an uchchhishta person is prohibited in mainstream Hinduism. However, the esoteric Tantric goddess Matangi is recommended to be offered uchchhishta food, in the polluted uchchhishta state, with the remains of food in the mouth and hands; Matangi is associated with pollution and the outcaste and embodies the forbidden transgression of social norms. The goddess in a legend from the Shaktisamgama-tantram is also said to be born from uchchhishta. The deity couples of Shiva-Parvati and Vishnu-Lakshmi dropped specks of food on the ground while eating. A divine maiden rose from the uchchhishta and asked for their uchchhishta. The deities blessed her and gave her the name Uchchhishta-Matangini (Matangi).

Another Tantric deity worshipped in the impure uchchhishta state is Uchchhishta Ganapati – a Tantric form of the elephant-headed god Ganesha – who also derives his name from uchchhishta.

While Matangi is offered human uchchhishta, the goddess Vimala is offered divine uchchhishta of the god Jagannath, a form of Vishnu. Vimala is the Tantric consort of Jagannath and the guardian goddess of the Jagannath Temple, Puri – the principal temple of the god. Vimala is said to be survive of the uchchhishta of Jagannath; vegetarian food offerings to Jagannath are offered to Vimala, after which they are sanctified as Mahaprasad (prasad). A legend justifies this tradition. Once, Shiva ate a food grain, the uchchhishta of Vishnu as the latter's prasad. Half the grain stuck in Shiva's bread; however the sage Narada noticed it and ate it. Parvati, was upset that her rightful share of Vishnu's prasad had been eaten by Narada. In a peeved mood, she went to Vishnu and complained. Vishnu pacified her saying that in the Kali Yuga (the present era as per Hindu beliefs), she would live at Puri as Vimala, and would daily eat the remnants of his food.

In later versions of the Hindu epic Ramayana, Shabari, a forest dweller woman, is instructed by her guru to wait for the arrival of the god Rama in her hermitage. She daily collects wild berries tasting them once for sourness, keeping only the sweet ones and discarding the bitter ones so that she could offer the god Rama only sweet berries, when he visits her. Unknowingly, the berries become uchchhishta. Over time, she ages to an elderly woman. When Rama finally visits her hermitage, Shabari offers him the uchchhishta berries. Lakshmana, Rama's brother, objects to the impurity of the uchchhishta berries, unworthy to be eaten. However, Rama accepts the uchchhishta berries, as they offered it with great love and devotion.

== See also ==
- Etiquette of Indian dining
