= Uchchhishta Ganapati =

Tantric aspect of the Hindu god Ganesha (Ganapati), one of Ganesha's thirty-one forms

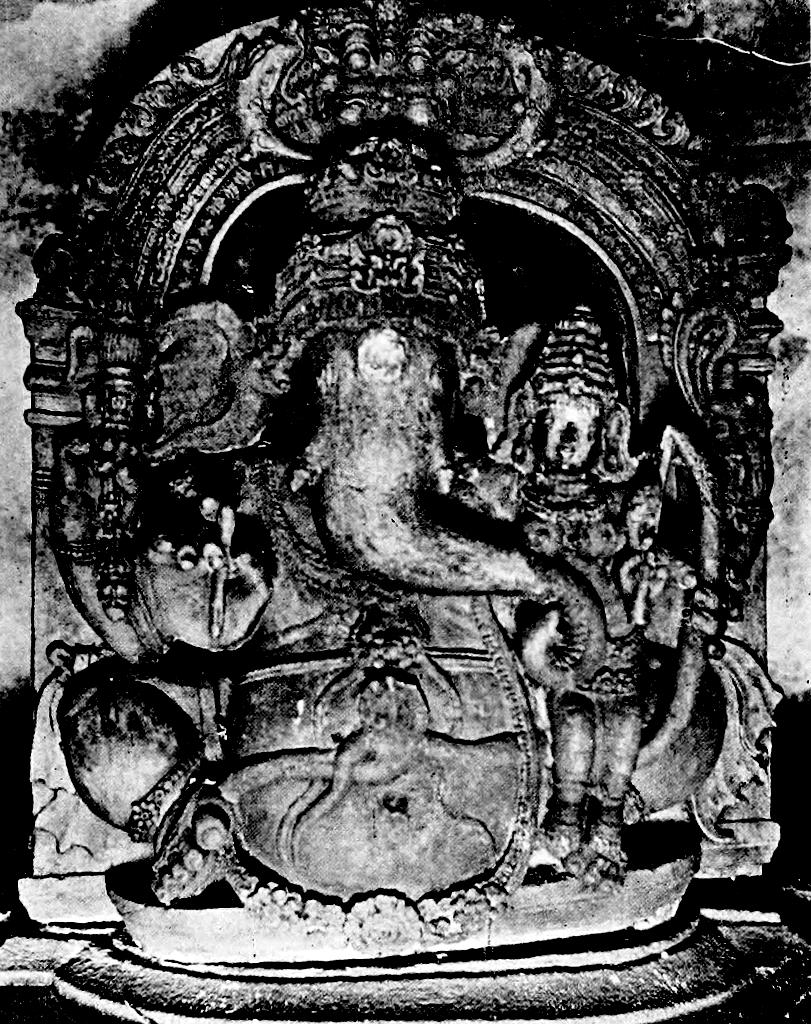
Uchchhishta Ganapati, Nanjangud

Uchchhishta Ganapati (Sanskrit: उच्छिष्टगणपति, romanized: Ucchiṣṭa-Gaṇapati) is a Tantric aspect of the Hindu god Ganesha (Ganapati). He is the primary deity of the Uchchhishta Ganapatya sect, one of six major schools of the Ganapatyas. He is worshipped primarily by heterodox vamachara rituals. He is one of the thirty-two forms of Ganesha, frequently mentioned in devotional literature. Herambasuta was one of the exponents of the Uchchhishta Ganapatya sect.

== Name ==
The god derives his name from Uchchhishta ("leftovers"). The word refers to the food left over at the end of a ritual, but in this context refers to its Tantric connotation. Uchchhishta is the food kept in the mouth, which is contaminated with saliva, thus ritually impure and a taboo in Hinduism.

== Iconography ==
The elephant-headed god is described to be red in colour in the Mantra-maharnava, while mentioned as dark in the Uttara-kamikagama. Another description describes him to be blue in complexion. The deity is described to have four or six arms. He is described to be seated, sometimes specifically noted in on padmasana (a lotus pedestal). The Uttara-kamikagama elaborates that he wears a ratna mukuta (jewelled crown) and has a third eye on his forehead.

The Kriyakramadyoti mentions that the god carries in his six hands: a lotus (in some descriptions, a blue lotus), a pomegranate, the veena, an akshamala (rosary) and a rice sprig. As per the Mantra-maharnava, he carries a bana (arrow), a dhanus (bow), a pasha (noose) and an ankusha (elephant goad). The Uttara-kamikagama says that the god has four arms and holds a pasha, an ankusha and a sugarcane in three hands.

Rao classifies Uchchhishta Ganapati as one of the five Shakti-Ganesha icons, where Ganesha is depicted with a shakti, that is, a female consort. The large figure of Ganesha is accompanied with smaller figure of the consort. The nude devi (goddess) sits on his left lap. She has two arms and wears various ornaments. In the Uttara-kamikagama, she is called Hasti Pisachi and is prescribed to be sculpted as a beautiful, young maiden. The fourth hand of Uchchhishta Ganapati touches the genitalia of the naked goddess. The Mantra-maharnava prescribes that the god should be depicted as though he is trying to have intercourse.

The textual descriptions generally do not correspond to the sculptures of the deity. Uchchhishta Ganapati is always shown with a naked consort, who is seated on his left lap. The god is generally depicted with four arms and holds a pasha, an ankusha and a ladoo or a modak (a sweet), while the fourth arm hugs the nude goddess around her hip. She holds a lotus or another flower in the left hand. Instead of his hands, the tip of his elephant trunk touches the yoni (vagina) of the goddess. Occasionally, the goddess touches the lingam (phallus) of the god with her right hand. The god is depicted ithyphallic in the latter icon. Such erotic imagery is restricted to his four-armed form.

Cohen notes that many Ganesha icons are depicted with a shakti, seated on his left hip. She holds a plate of modaks in her lap and the god's trunk reaches into it, to fetch the sweet. The trunk is taken as a symbolic of an "erotic bond" between Ganesha and the goddess. The Uchchhishta Ganapati takes the idea a step further, by eliminating the bowl of sweets and allowing the trunk to reach the goddess' yoni. This erotic iconography reflects the influence of the Tantric Ganapatya (the sect that considered Ganesha as the Supreme Being) sects. The pomegranate is also a symbol of fertility, often represented in the icons of the sects.

== Worship ==
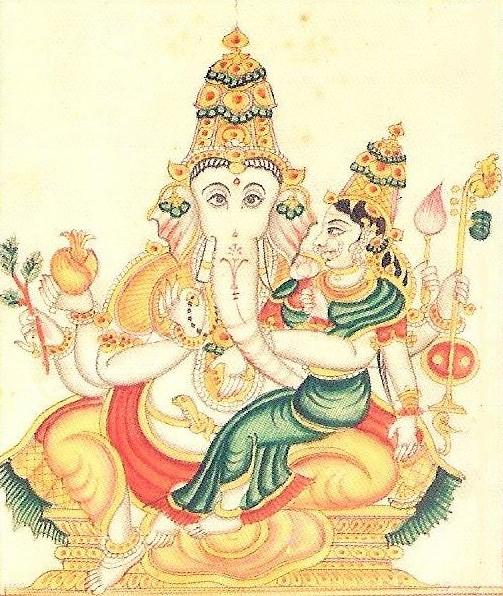
Uchchhishta Ganapati, folio from the 19th-century Sritattvanidhi. A rare depiction of the deity with a clothed goddess.

As per the Kriyakramadyoti, Uchchhishta Ganapati is worshipped as a giver of great boons. Rao notes that he is worshipped by "many" to gain the desired from the deity. He is also regarded as the guardian of the country. Meditating over his form is said to impart control over the five sensory organs. A temple dedicated to Uchchhishta Ganapati exists in Tirunelveli, where he is worshipped as a giver of progeny.

The Kanchi Ganesh shrine within the Jagannath Temple, Puri houses the icon of Uchchhishta Ganapati, also called Bhanda Ganapati and Kamada Ganapati, which was originally the patron icon of Kanchipuram (Kanchi), but was brought to Puri as war booty when the Gajapati king Purushottama Deva (1470–97) of Puri defeated Kanchi.

Uchchhishta Ganapati is the patron of the Uchchhishta Ganapatya sect, one of the six major schools of the Ganapatya sect. They follow Tantric Vamachara ("left-handed") practices. The sect may have been influenced by the Kaula worship of Shaktism (Goddess-oriented sect). The iconography of the deity bears Kaula Tantric character. The erotic iconography is interpreted to convey the oneness of Ganesha and Devi ("The Hindu Divine Mother"). The sect also worships a Ganesha, who is depicted drinking wine and also its use in worship, a taboo in classical Hinduism (see Panchamakara). Adherents of this sect wear red marks on their foreheads. This sect does not believe in caste and varna distinctions, disregards the orthodox Hindu rules of sexual intercourse and marriage and leaves the adherence of traditional Hindu rituals to the follower's own will.

As per Vamachara practices, the deity is worshipped when the devotee is in the Uchchhishta ("ritually impure") state, that is, nude or with remnants of food (Uchchhishta) in his mouth.

Uchchhishta Ganapati is also associated with six rituals of abhichara (uses of spells for malevolent purposes) by which the adept can cause the target to suffer delusions, be overcome with irresistible attraction or envy, or to be enslaved, paralysed or killed.

== See also ==
- Panchamakara
