= Uchchhishta Ganapathy Temple =

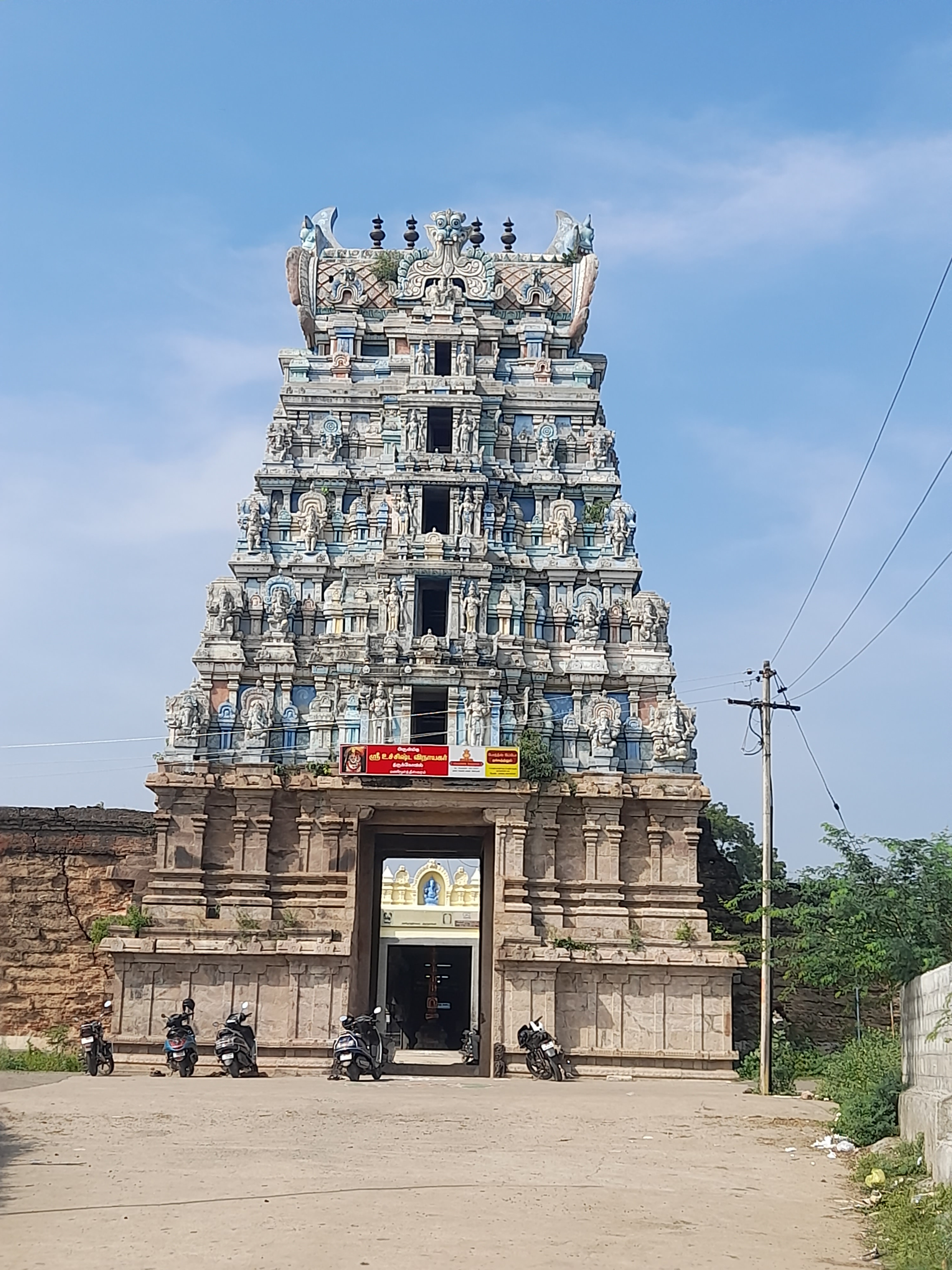

- Uchchhishta Ganapathy Temple, Tirunelveli, Tamil Nadu, India

Religion
- Affiliation: Hinduism
- District: Tirunelveli
- Deity: Uchchhishta Ganapati
- Festivals: Vinayagar Chadhurthi (10 days), Tamil New Year Day

Location
- Location: Tirunelveli
- State: Tamil Nadu
- Country: India
- Coordinates: 8°44′35.16″N 77°43′09.48″E

Architecture
- Type: Dravidian architecture
- Completed: 1,000 years old

Specifications
- Temple: One
- Elevation: 84 m (276 ft)

Uchchhishta Ganapathy Temple is an Uchchhishta Ganapati temple situated in Tirunelveli in the State of Tamil Nadu, in India. It is said to be the biggest Vinayagar temple in Asia.

== Location ==
It is located at an altitude of about 84 m above the mean sea level with the geographic coordinates of 8.7431°N 77.7193°E. It is situated on the banks of river Tamirabharani, in the neighbourhood of Manimoortheeswaram, just 2 km away from Tirunelveli Junction railway station.

== Other deities ==
Nellaiappar (Shiva), Gandhimathi Amman (Parvati as consort of Nellaiappar), Subramaniya with his consorts Valli and Deivanai, Dakshinamurthy, Chandikeswarar, Swarna Akarshana Bhairavar, Sage Patanjali, Sage Vyagrabathar and 31 forms of Ganesha are the other deities found in this temple with the main deity Uchchhishta Ganapathy.

== Festivals ==
Vinayagar Chaturdi is celebrated every year for ten days. In this 1,000 year old temple, in the year 2023, Vinayagar Chaturdi was celebrated on 2023-09-18 in a grand manner.

== Maintenance ==
This temple, also known as Moorthi Vinayagar temple, is maintained under the control of the Hindu Religious and Charitable Endowments Department of Government of Tamil Nadu.
