= Shabari =

Mythological character

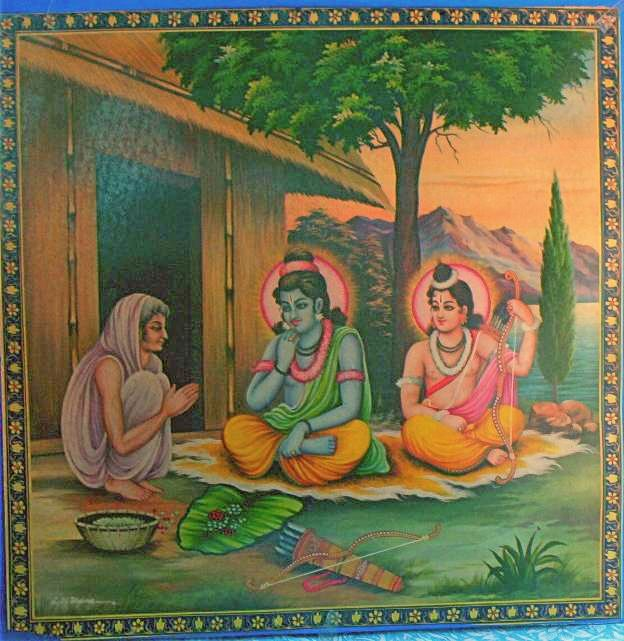
- The Shabari episode, from an early-20th-century print
- Devotee of: Rama
- Teacher: Rishi Matanga

Information
- Gender: Female
- Religion: Hinduism

Shabari (Sanskrit: शबरी, IAST: Śabarī), also known as Bhilni, Bhilani, and Shramana, is an elderly woman ascetic in the Hindu epic Ramayana. She is described as an ardently devoted woman who received Rama's blessing due to her bhakti towards him.

== Story ==
Shabari was a woman from a village. According to Krishna Dutt, she was a seeker of knowledge and wanted to know the meaning of Dharma. After days of travel, she met Sage Matanga at the foot of Mount Rishyamukha. She accepted him as guru, serving him with devotion for many years. When Matanga was about to die, Shabari, now elderly, stated that after serving him throughout her life, she now sought to reach for herself the same "abode of peace" which Matanga had reached. The sage responded that, if she offered seva (service), the god Rama would give her darshana. He told her to await Rama's arrival. Then, while sitting in lotus posture, the sage attained Mahasamadhi. Following her guru's advice, Shabari awaited Rama's arrival.

Every day, Shabari would go out of her ashram, with the help of a walking stick, and pluck berries for Rama. She would pluck one, taste it and, if it was sweet, she would put it in her basket, discarding the bitter ones. She wanted to give the good berries to Rama. She didn't know that offerings must not be tasted. Thus, collecting a few berries, Shabari would return to the ashram and eagerly await Rama's arrival.

=== Rama's Arrival ===
According to the scriptural account, even though hundreds of other yogis were waiting to receive Rama in their ashrams, Rama went only to Shabari's ashram because of her sincere devotion. On seeing Rama, Shabari became ecstatic and said, "There were so many exalted yogis waiting for your darshan, but you came to this unworthy devotee (...) This clearly shows that you will neither see whether a devotee lives in a palace or humble hut, whether he is erudite or ignorant (...) neither see caste nor color. You will only see the true bhakti (...) I do not have anything to offer other than my heart, but here are some berries. May it please you, my Lord." Shabari offered the fruits which she had meticulously collected. As Rama tasted them, Lakshmana raised the concern that Shabari had already tasted them and they were, therefore, unworthy of eating. To this, Rama responded that, of the many types of food he had tasted, "nothing could equal these berries, offered with such devotion. You taste them, then alone will you know. Whomsoever offers a fruit, leaf, flower or some water with love, I partake in it with great joy." Traditional writers use this narrative to indicate that in bhakti, faults are not seen by the deities.

Pleased with Shabari's devotion, Rama blesses her with his vision. Rama notices the donas, or bowls, of handmade leaves in which she had offered the fruits and is impressed by the hard work Shabari has gone through to make them and, hence, blesses the tree so that the leaves naturally grow in the shape of a bowl. Shabari also tells Rama to take help from Sugriva and where to find him. The Ramayana says that Shabari was a very bright and knowledgeable saint.

=== Rama's discourse ===
Rama delivers his discourse on nava-vidha bhakti (ninefold devotion) to Shabari,

Such pure devotion is expressed in nine ways. First is satsang or association with love-intoxicated devotees and righteous people. The second is to develop a taste for hearing My nectar-like stories. The third is service to the guru (...) Fourth is to sing My kirtana (communal chorus) (...) Japa or repetition of My Holy name and chanting My bhajanas are the fifth expression (...) To follow scriptural injunctions always, to practice control of the senses, nobility of character and selfless service, these are expressions of the sixth mode of bhakti. Seeing Me manifested everywhere in this world and worshipping My saints more than myself is the seventh mode of bhakti. To find no fault with anyone and to be contented with one's lot is the eighth mode of bhakti. Unreserved surrender with total faith in My strength is the ninth and highest stage. Shabari, anyone who practices one of these nine modes of My bhakti pleases Me most and reaches Me without fail. That which is most difficult for the greatest yogis was easily attained by you, Shabari, because of your sincere devotion.

== See also ==
- Nath Sampradaya
- Sabarimala
