= List of historical regions of India =

Historical regions of India refer to distinct cultural, political, or geographic zones that have existed through India's long history. For the purpose of this list, India is defined as the area contained roughly within the natural boundaries of the Himalayas to the north, the Hindu Kush and Suleiman ranges to the northwest, the Bay of Bengal to the east, the Arabian Sea to the west, and the Indian Ocean to the south.

These historical regions were current in different time periods – from ancient to medieval and early modern eras – and may often overlap. Political boundaries have shifted significantly over the centuries, so usually a historical region cannot be assigned to any single modern state or administrative boundary. The list below indicates which present-day Indian states or territories contain all or part of each of the listed historical regions.

This list reflects India’s complex and layered history, from Vedic tribes and Mahajanapadas to medieval kingdoms and cultural zones.

== Northern India ==
- Ajmer – Rajasthan; important under Chauhans and later Mughals.
- Awadh (Oudh) – Uttar Pradesh; center of Nawabi culture.
- Delhi – Seat of many empires including the Delhi Sultanate and Mughals.
- Doab – Fertile land between Ganges and Yamuna.
- Kuru – Vedic region in Haryana/Delhi; central to the Mahabharata.
- Kosala – Ancient kingdom in eastern Uttar Pradesh and Chhattisgarh.
- Matsya – Rajasthan; mentioned in Vedic texts and epics.
- Mewat - Haryana, Rajasthan and Uttar Pradesh; ruled by Muslim Khanzadas under the Delhi Sultanate.
- Mahasu – Ancient land of Dev Parampara traditions; Himachal Pradesh/Western Uttarakhand/parts of Haryana.
- Panchala – Vedic kingdom in Uttar Pradesh.
- Rohilkhand – Western UP; ruled by Rohilla Afghans.
- Suratrasena – Around Mathura, in Buddhist texts.
- Tirhut – Bihar; part of Mithila, ruled by the Karnata dynasty.
- Trigarta – Himachal Pradesh and Punjab.
- Khasa Desh – Himalayan tribal belt (Uttarakhand & Nepal).
- Uttarakuru – Mythical northern kingdom in ancient Indian cosmology.

== Western India ==
- Anarta – Ancient region corresponding to parts of present-day Gujarat; associated with the Yadava clan and mentioned in ancient texts.
- Berar – Region in present-day Maharashtra; historically significant as part of the Bahmani Sultanate and later the Nizam's dominion.
- Bundelkhand – Region spanning parts of Uttar Pradesh and Madhya Pradesh; known for its association with the Chandelas and Bundela rulers.
- Gujarat – Coastal region in western India; historically significant for its trade centers like Cambay and Surat, and as the seat of the Solanki dynasty.
- Khandesh – Region in northwestern Maharashtra; ruled by the Faruqi dynasty before being annexed by the Mughals.
- Lata – Southern part of present-day Gujarat; known in ancient times and mentioned in various inscriptions and literary sources.
- Malwa – Region in central India, primarily in Madhya Pradesh; historically significant as a center of the Paramara dynasty and later the Malwa Sultanate.
- Marwar – Region in western Rajasthan; centered around Jodhpur and ruled by the Rathore dynasty.
- Mewar – Region in southern Rajasthan; centered around Udaipur and ruled by the Sisodia dynasty.
- Radha – Ancient region corresponding to parts of present-day West Bengal; distinct from Vanga and mentioned in early texts.
- Saurashtra – Peninsula in western Gujarat; known for its ancient ports and as a center of the Maitraka dynasty.
- Surat – Port city in Gujarat; significant during the Mughal period as a major trading hub.
- Maru Pradesh – Desert region in western Rajasthan; encompassing the Thar Desert and associated with various Rajput clans. 
- Gurjara – Region associated with the Gurjara-Pratihara dynasty; encompassing parts of Rajasthan and Gujarat.

== Central India ==
- Anupa – Narmada basin, primarily in Madhya Pradesh; historically significant during the Gupta and Vakataka periods.
- Avanti – Ujjain region, now in Madhya Pradesh; capital of the ancient Malwa region, important under the Mauryas and later dynasties.
- Chedi – Region covering parts of Madhya Pradesh and Uttar Pradesh; mentioned in the Mahabharata as an important kingdom.
- Dasharna – Region around modern-day Malwa and Bundelkhand; mentioned in ancient texts and inscriptions.
- Gondwana – Tribal region spanning Madhya Pradesh, Chhattisgarh, and Maharashtra; historically ruled by Gond tribes and later by the Marathas.
- Mahakoshal – Region in Central Madhya Pradesh; historically a significant region under the Gupta Empire.
- Rishika – Possibly a tribal region in central India; exact location remains unclear.

== Eastern India ==
- Anga – Region in Bihar and Jharkhand; known for its significance during the Mahajanapada period and for its role in Buddhism.
- Bengal – Includes West Bengal and Bangladesh; historically significant under the Gupta, Pala, and Mughal Empires.
- Kalinga – Region in Odisha and northern Andhra Pradesh; famously associated with Ashoka the Great and the Mauryan Empire.
- Magadha – Region in Bihar; heartland of the Maurya and Gupta empires, critical to the development of Indian civilization.
- Mithila – Region in Bihar and Nepal; known for its Maithili culture and associated with King Janaka.
- Odra (Utkala) – Region in Odisha, distinct from Kalinga; a part of the ancient kingdom of Utkala mentioned in the Mahabharata.
- Vanga – Bengal region; early center of trade and culture in South Asia.
- Videha – Region in Bihar and Nepal; associated with the Mahajanapada and the famous King Janaka.
- Vatsa – Region in Uttar Pradesh (Kaushambi); a Mahajanapada of Buddhist fame.
- Pundravardhana – North Bengal (present-day Bangladesh); historically significant as a Buddhist center.
- Champa – Ancient city in Bihar; mentioned in Buddhist texts as an important urban center.
- Tamralipta – Port city in Bengal; historically important for its role in maritime trade.

== Southern India ==
- Asmaka (Assaka) – Region in present-day Telangana and Maharashtra; a southern Mahajanapada mentioned in ancient texts.
- Carnatic (Karnata) – Region in Karnataka and northern Tamil Nadu; home to the Vijayanagara Empire and later the Nawabs.
- Chera – Region in Kerala and parts of Tamil Nadu; known for the Chera dynasty's control over the region.
- Chola – Region in Tamil Nadu; historically significant for its maritime empire and influence in Southeast Asia.
- Kanchi – City in Tamil Nadu (Kanchipuram); a major center under the Pallavas and Cholas.
- Pandya – Region in Tamil Nadu; associated with the ancient Tamil kingdoms and their cultural influence.
- Telingana (Telangana) – Region in southern India, covering Andhra Pradesh; historically ruled by the Kakatiya dynasty.
- Travancore – Region in Kerala; a princely state under British rule, important for its reforms and cultural heritage.
- Vidarbha – Region in Maharashtra; historically part of the Vakataka dynasty and the seat of the Maratha Empire.
- Dravida – General term for the Tamil-speaking regions of southern India.
- Kongu Nadu – Region in western Tamil Nadu; known for its importance in the textile industry and its role in the Chola dynasty.
- Tulu Nadu – Coastal region in Karnataka; associated with distinct Tulu culture and language.
- Ikkshvaku – Andhra Pradesh; early Deccan dynasty.
- Andhra – Predating Andhra Pradesh; known from ancient texts.

== Northeastern India ==
- Kamarupa – Region in Assam; home to early kingdoms known for their Buddhist traditions and Tantric practices.
- Manipur – Independent kingdom with rich cultural heritage, known for its traditions, dance forms, and warfare.
- Tripura – Ancient kingdom in northeastern India; its historical legacy dates back to the Mahabharata period.
- Dimapur – Capital of the Kachari kingdom in Nagaland; a key location during the Kachari dynasty's rule.

== Northwestern India and Greater India ==
- Gandhara – Region in modern-day Pakistan and Afghanistan; a Greco-Buddhist center, home to major cultural exchanges between Greek and Indian civilizations.
- Sindh – Now in Pakistan; historically ruled by the Rai dynasty, and later under Muslim rulers, it was a vital part of the early Indian subcontinent.
- Sivi – Northwestern tribal kingdom, possibly in Sindh or Punjab; mentioned in the Mahabharata and historical texts as a prominent region.
- Madra – Region in Punjab (Pakistan); historically known as the kingdom of Madri, a key figure in the Mahabharata.
- Bahlika – Region in northwestern India, sometimes linked with Balkh (in present-day Afghanistan); important for its role in ancient history and as a cultural crossroads.
