= Matangi =

Hindu goddess

- Goddess of wisdom, arts, the spoken word and supernatural powers
- Member of The Ten Mahavidyas
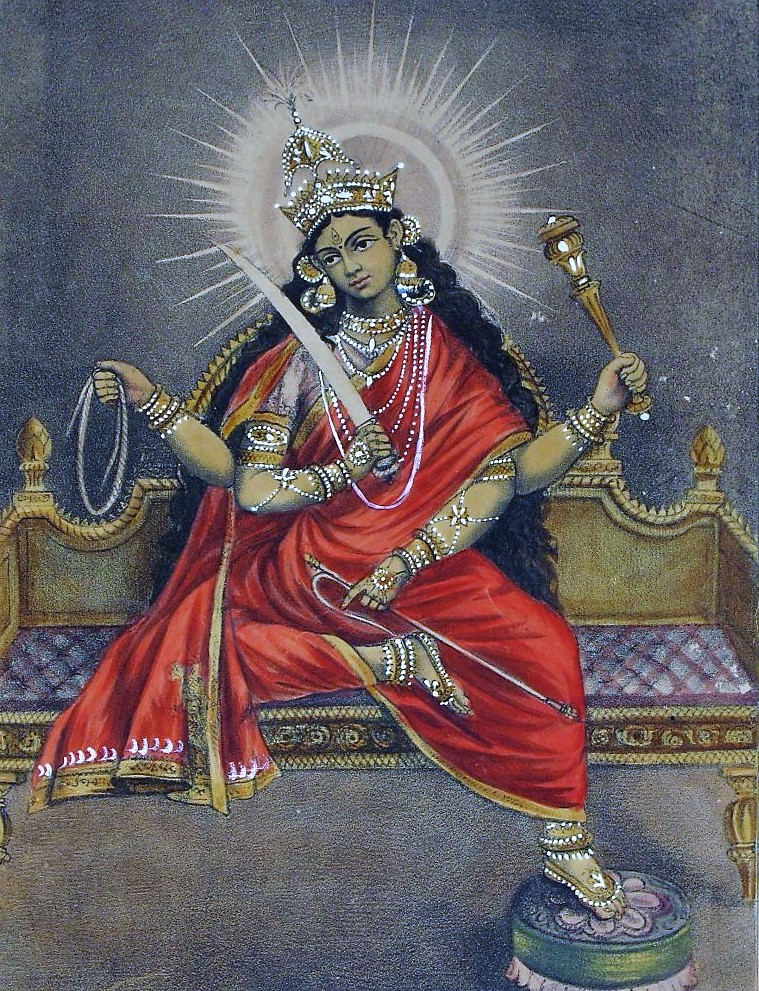
- Late 19th-century lithograph depicting the goddess with a sword, shield, goad and club
- Other names: Raja Matangi, Mantrini Devi (Minister of Tripura Sundari), Shyamala
- Devanagari: मातङ्गी
- Sanskrit transliteration: Mātaṅgī
- Affiliation: Mahavidya, Kali, Saraswati, Tripura Sundari, Parvati, Durga, Adi Shakti
- Abode: On the periphery of traditional society like forests and in speech
- Consort: Mataṅga Rudra

Matangi (Sanskrit: मातङ्गी, IAST: Mātaṅgī) is a Hindu goddess. She is one of the Mahavidyas, ten Tantric goddesses and an aspect of the Hindu Divine Mother. She is considered to be the Tantric form of Sarasvati, the goddess of music and learning. Matangi governs speech, music, knowledge and the arts. Her worship is prescribed to acquire supernatural powers, especially gaining control over enemies, attracting people to oneself, acquiring mastery over the arts and gaining supreme knowledge.

Matangi is often associated with pollution, inauspiciousness and the periphery of Hindu society, which is embodied in her most popular form, known as Uchchhishta-Chandālini or Uchchhishta-Mātāngini. She is described as an outcaste (Chandalini) and offered left-over or partially eaten food (Uchchhishta) with unwashed hands or food after eating, both of which are considered to be impure in classical Hinduism.

Matangi is represented as emerald green in colour. While Uchchhishta-Matangini carries a noose, sword, goad, and club, her other well-known form, Raja-Matangi, plays the veena and is often pictured with a parrot.

== Iconography and textual descriptions ==
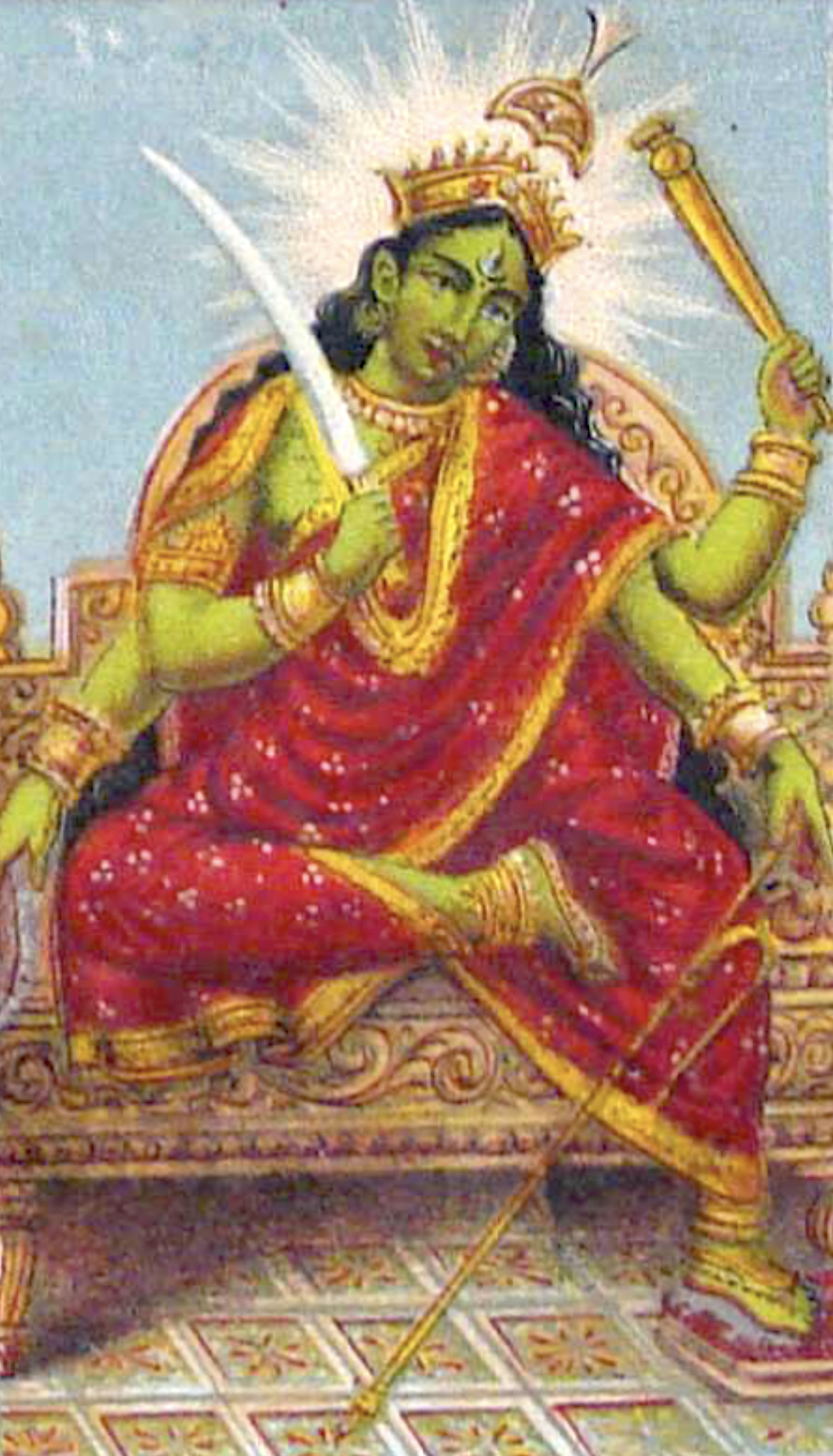
19th century lithography of Matangi.

The Dhyana mantra (a mantra that details the form of the deity on which a devotee should meditate) of the Tantrasara describes Uchchhishta-Matangini, one of the most popular forms of the goddess. Matangi is seated on a corpse and wears red garments, red jewellery and a garland of gunja seeds. The goddess is described as a young, sixteen-year-old maiden with fully developed breasts. She carries a skull bowl and a sword in her two hands, and is offered leftovers.

The Dhyana mantras in the Purashcharyarnava and the Tantrasara describe Matangi as blue in colour. The crescent moon adorns her forehead. She has three eyes and a smiling face. She wears jewellery and is seated on a jewelled throne. She carries a noose, a sword, a goad, and a club in her four arms. Her waist is slim and her breasts well-developed.

The Dhyana Mantra of Raja-Matangi from the Purashcharyarnava describes Matangi as green in colour with the crescent moon on her forehead. She has long hair, a smiling expression and intoxicated eyes, and wears a garland of kadamba flowers and various ornaments. She perspires a little around the face, which renders her even more beautiful. Below her navel are three horizontal folds of skin and a thin vertical line of fine hair. Seated on an altar and flanked by two parrots, she represents the 64 arts. The Saradatilaka, adds to this description that Raja-Matangi plays the veena, wears conch-shell earrings and flower garlands, and has flower paintings adorning her forehead. She is also depicted wearing a garland of white lotus (here lotus signifies multi-colored world creation), similar to the iconography of goddess Saraswati, with whom she is associated.

According to Kalidasa's Shyamaladandakam, Matangi plays a ruby-studded veena and speaks sweetly. The Dhyana Mantra describes her to be four-armed, with a dark emerald complexion, full breasts anointed with red kumkum powder, and a crescent moon on her forehead. She carries a noose, a goad, a sugarcane bow and flower arrows, which the goddess Tripura Sundari is often described to hold. She is also described to love the parrot and is embodied in the nectar of song.

The green complexion is associated with deep knowledge and is also the colour of Budha, the presiding deity of the planet Mercury who governs intelligence. Matangi is often depicted with a parrot in her hands, representing speech. The veena symbolizes her association with music.

== Legends ==
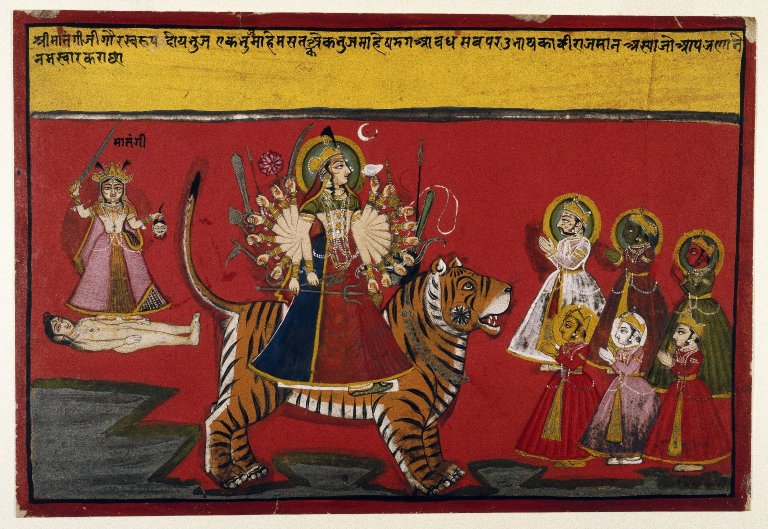
The painting of Goddess Matangi in Brooklyn Museum

Matangi is often named as the ninth Mahavidya. A list contained within the prose of the Mundamala equates Vishnu's ten avatars with the ten Mahavidyas. The Buddha is equated to Matangi. A similar list in the Guhyatiguhya-Tantra omits Matangi altogether, however the scholar Sircar interprets the goddess Durga – equated to the avatar Kalki in the list – as an allusion to Matangi.

In a story from the Shakta Maha-Bhagavata Purana, which narrates the creation of all the Mahavidyas, Sati, the daughter of Daksha and wife of the god Shiva, feels insulted that she and Shiva are not invited to Daksha's yagna ("fire sacrifice") and insists on going there, despite Shiva's protests. After futile attempts to convince Shiva, the enraged Sati transforms into the Mahavidyas, including Matangi. The Mahavidyas then surround Shiva from the ten cardinal directions; Matangi stands in the northwest. Another similar legend replaces Sati with Kali (the chief Mahavidya) as the wife of Shiva and the origin of Matangi and the other Mahavidyas. The Devi Bhagavata Purana describes Matangi and her fellow Mahavidyas as war-companions and forms of the goddess Shakambhari.

The Shaktisamgama-tantra narrates the birth of Uchchhishta-Matangini. Once, the god Vishnu and his wife Lakshmi visited Shiva and his wife Parvati (a reincarnation of Sati) and gave them a banquet of fine foods. While eating, the deities dropped some food on the ground, from which arose a beautiful maiden, a manifestation of Goddess Saraswati, who asked their left-overs. The four deities granted her their left-overs as prasad, food made sacred by having been first consumed by the deity. This can be interpreted as the Uchchhishta of the deity, although due to its negative connotation the word Uchchhishta is never explicitly used in connection to prasad. Shiva decreed that those who repeat her mantra and worship her will have their material desires satisfied and gain control over foes, declaring her the giver of boons. From that day, the maiden was known as Uchchhishta-Matangini.

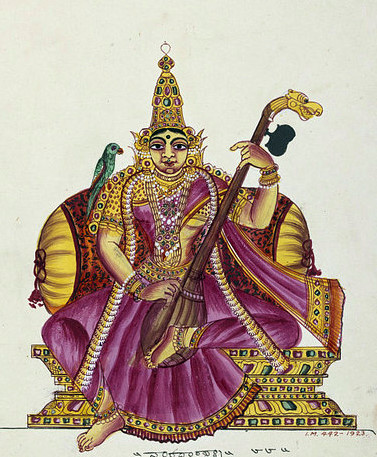
As in this early 19th century South Indian painting, Raja-Matangi is usually depicted playing the veena and with a parrot in her company.

The Pranotasani Tantra (18th Century) and Naradpancharatra narrates that once Parvati longed to go back to her maternal house for some days and asked Shiva's permission to do so. The reluctant Shiva agreed on the condition that if she did not return in a few days, he would come to fetch her. Parvati agreed and went to her father Himalaya's place, where she stayed for many days. The lovesick Shiva went to Himavan's abode disguised as an ornament seller and sold shell ornaments to Parvati. In order to test her fidelity, the disguised Shiva asked for sex in return. The disgusted Parvati was about to curse the ornament-seller when she realizes by her yogic powers that it was none other than Shiva. She agrees to grant sexual favours but at the appropriate time. In the evening, Parvati returns to Shiva's abode disguised as a Chandala huntress. She is dressed in red and had a lean figure and large breasts and performs a dance to lure him. She told Shiva that she had come to do penance. Shiva replied that he is the one gives fruit to all penance and took her hand, kissed her and had sex with her. While they had sex, Shiva himself turned into a Chandala and recognized the Chandala woman as his wife. After the sex, Parvati asked Shiva to grant her wish that her form as a Chandalini (the Chandala female form in which Shiva had sex with her) might last forever as Uchchhishta-Chandalini and that her worship in this form precede his for his worship to be considered fruitful. This tale is also found in many Bengali Mangalkavyas. In these texts, however, Parvati is not explicitly identified with Matangi.

The Svatantra-tantra mentions that Matanga practised austerities for thousands of years to gain the power to subdue all beings. Finally, goddess Tripura Sundari appeared and from eyes emitted rays that produced goddess Kali, who had greenish complexion and was known as Raja-Matangini. With her help, Matanga fulfilled his desire. Matanga Tantra and many other texts including the Shyamaladandakam describe Matangi as the daughter of the sage Matanga.

Another tale is associated with the temple dedicated to Kauri-bai—an aspect of Matangi—who appeared in the low caste area of Varanasi. Kauri-bai is Shiva's sister who was obsessed with the Brahmin ways and purity and abhorred Shiva's heterodox practices like dwelling in cremation grounds, partaking of intoxicants and being in the company of ghosts and goblins. While Shiva simply ignored Kauri-bai's words at first, after his marriage his wife Parvati could not bear Kauri-bai's abusive words toward her husband and cursed Kauri-bai to be reborn in and spend her entire life within an "untouchable" area of Varanasi which Kauri-bai considered polluted. Consequently, Kauri-bai was indeed reborn in the low-caste area of Varanasi and felt very unhappy. She pleaded her brother Shiva—the Lord of Varanasi—who granted her the boon that no pilgrimage to Varanasi would be deemed complete without her worship.

== Associations ==
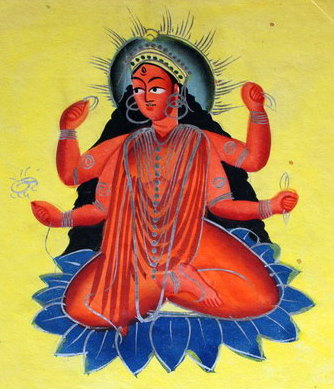
A Kalighat painting of Matangi

Matangi is often associated with pollution, especially left-over or partially eaten food (Uchchhishta or Ucçhishṭa, उच्छिष्ट) considered impure in Hinduism. She is often offered such polluted left-over food and is in one legend described to be born from it. Matangi is herself described as the leftover or residue, symbolizing the Divine Self that is left over after all things perish. As the patron of left-over food offerings, she embodies inauspiciousness and the forbidden transgression of social norms.

Matangi is often described as an outcaste and impure. Her association with pollution mainly streams from her relation to outcaste communities, considered to be polluted in ancient Hindu society. These social groups deal in occupations deemed inauspicious and polluted like the collection of waste, meat-processing and working in cremation grounds. In a Nepali context, such groups are collectively called Matangi, who collect waste—including human waste—and other inauspicious things, and often live outside villages. Thus she is associated with death, pollution, inauspiciousness and the periphery of ancient Hindu society. She represents equality as she is worshipped by both upper and lower caste people.

Matangi is also associated with forests and tribal peoples, who lie outside conventional Hindu society. Her thousand-name hymn from the Nanayavarta-tantra mentions lines that describe her as dwelling in, walking in, knowing and relishing the forest.

Matangi represents the power of the spoken word (Vaikhari) as an expression of thoughts and the mind. She also relates to the power of listening and grasping speech and converting it back to knowledge and thought. Besides spoken word, she also governs all other expressions of inner thought and knowledge, like art, music, and dance. Matangi presides over the middle part of speech (Madhyama), where ideas are translated into the spoken word and in her highest role, represents Para-Vaikhari—the Supreme Word manifested through speech and that encompasses knowledge of the scriptures. She is described as the goddess of learning and speech, and the bestower of knowledge and talent. She is also called Mantrini, the mistress of the sacred mantras. She also represents the word of a guru, who serves as a spiritual guide. Matangi is described as dwelling in the Throat chakra—the origin of speech—and on the tip of the tongue. She is also associated with a channel called Saraswati from the third eye to the tip of the tongue. According to David Frawley, her description as impure refers to the nature of the spoken word, which labels things and stereotypes them, thereby hindering actual contact with the soul of things. The goddess is described as one who helps a person to use words in the right way and to go beyond it to seek the soul and inner knowledge, which lie outside the demarcated boundaries of tradition.

Matangi is regarded as a Tantric form of Saraswati, the goddess of knowledge and the arts of mainstream Hinduism, with whom she shares many traits. Both embody music and are depicted playing the veena. They are also both said to be the Nada (sound or energy) that flows through the Nadi channels in the body through which life force flows. Both are related to rain clouds, thunder and rivers. Though both govern learning and speech, Saraswati represents the orthodox knowledge of the Brahmins while Matangi—the wild and ecstatic outcast—embodies the "extraordinary" beyond the boundaries of mainstream society, especially inner knowledge. Matangi is also associated with Ganesha, the elephant-headed god of knowledge and obstacle removal. Both are related to the elephant and learning. Matangi is also regarded as his mother. Matangi is also described as a minister of the Mahavidya goddess Tripura Sundari or Rajarajeshvari, the Queen of Queens.

== Worship ==
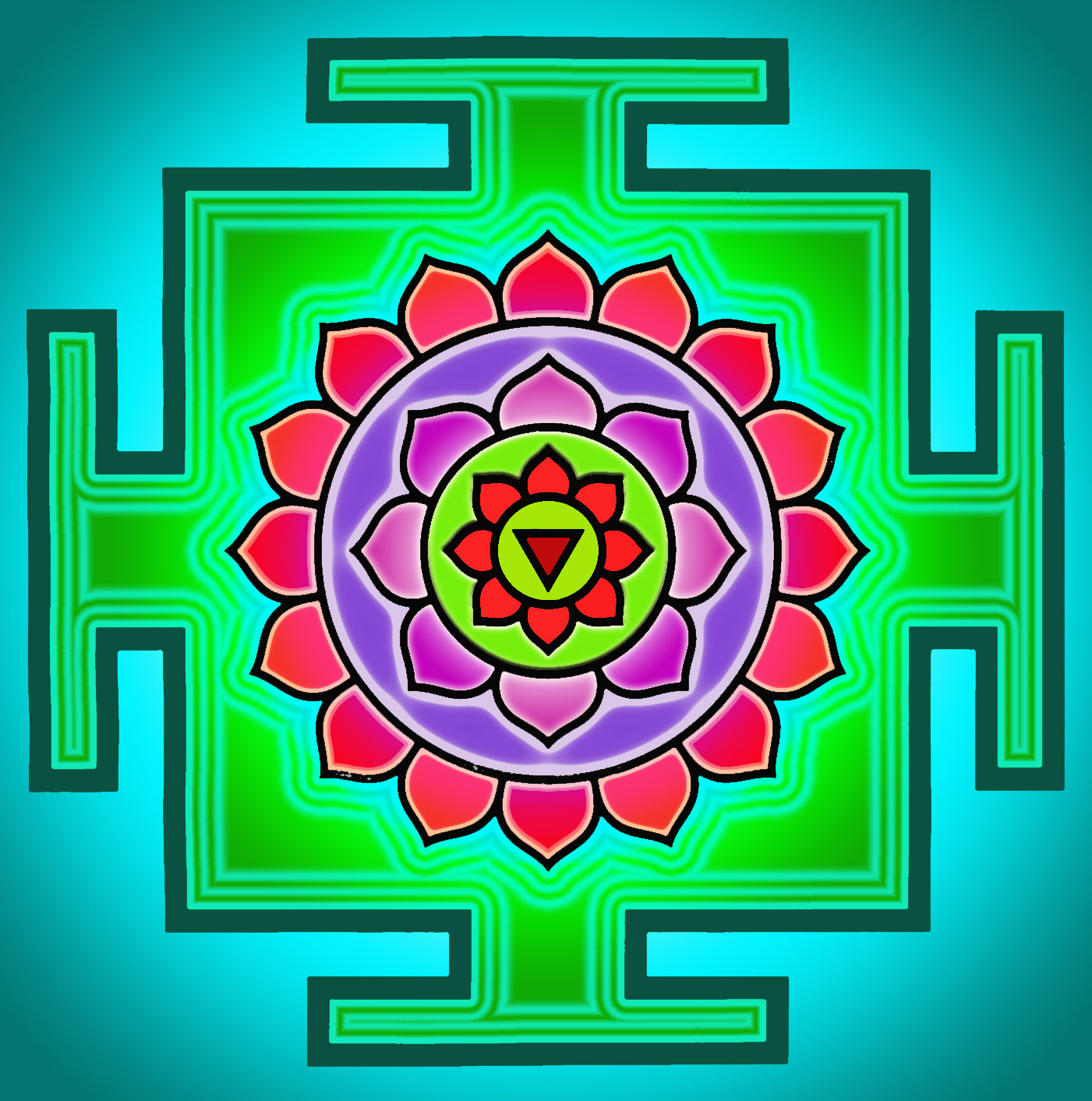
The yantra of Matangi, which is used in her worship

Besides the Mahavidya Bagalamukhi, Matangi is the other Mahavidya, whose worship is primarily prescribed to acquire supernatural powers. A hymn in the Maha-Bhagavata Purana asks her grace to control one's foes, while the Tantrasara says that recitation of her mantra, meditation on her form and her ritual worship gives one to the power to control people and make them attracted to oneself. Tantric sadhakas are regarded to have transcended the pollution by offering her left-over or partially eaten food (Uchchhishta) and thus overcome their ego. Worship of Matangi is described to allow her devotee to face the forbidden and transcend pollution, leading him to salvation or allowing him to gain supernatural powers for worldly goals. The Purashcharyarnava describes pleasing the goddess would result in her answering all the devotee's queries by whispering in her ear.

Matangi is often worshipped with the mantra syllable Aim, which is associated with Saraswati and is the seed-syllable of knowledge, learning, and teaching. A longer mantra is also used:

Om Hrim Aim Shrim Namo Bhagvati Ucchishtachandali Shri Matangeswari Sarvajanavasankari Swaha
"Reverence to adorable Matangi, the outcast and residue, who gives control over all creatures"

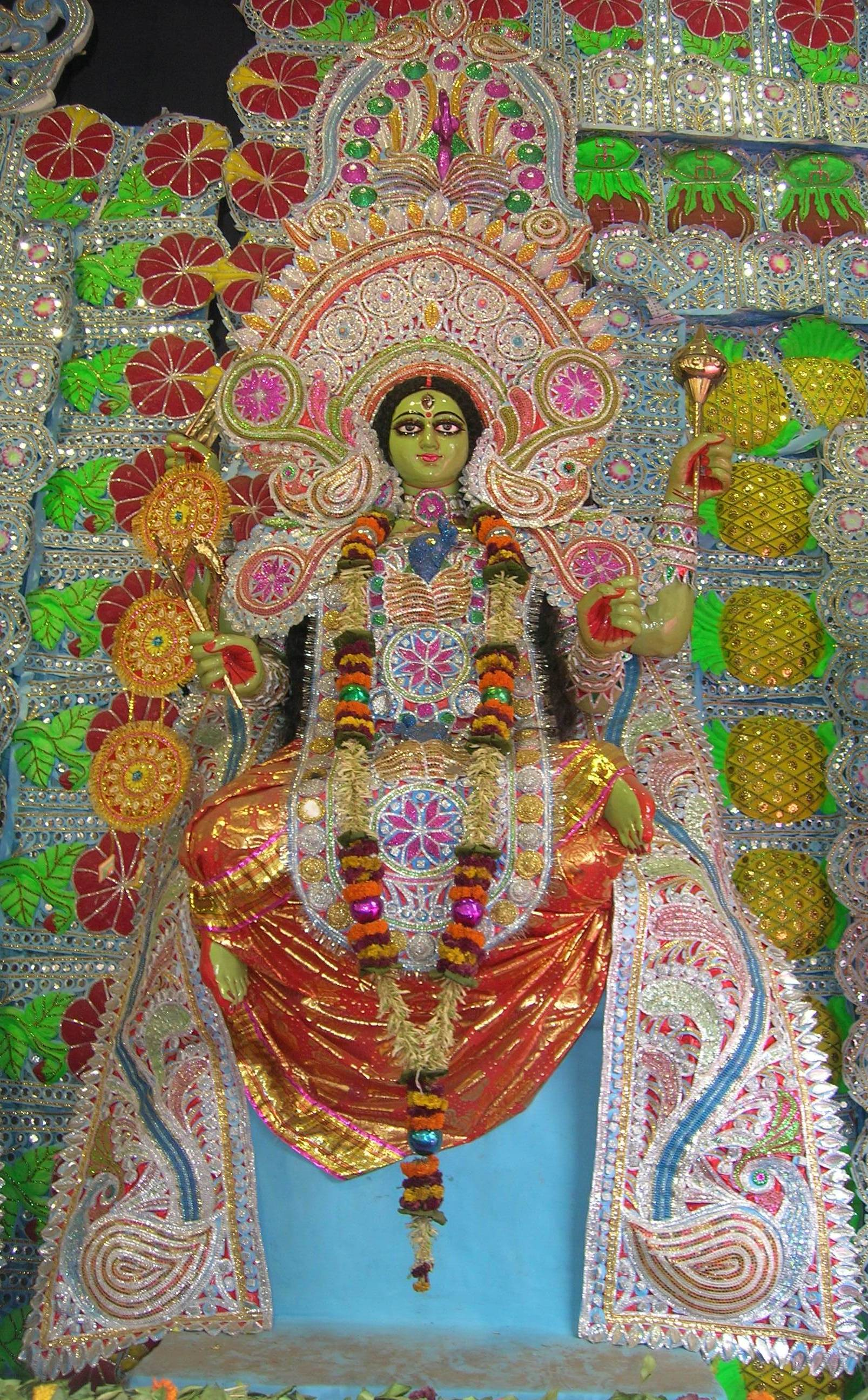
Matangi worshipped with other Mahavidyas at a Kali Puja pandal in Kolkata.

Her mantra may be repeated ten thousand times, repeated one thousand times while offering flowers and ghee in a fire sacrifice, or repeated one hundred times while offering water (Arghya) or while offering food to Brahmin priests. Her yantra (sacred geometric diagram), whether physically constructed or mentally envisioned, is used in worship along with the mantra. Offering certain items to a fire sacrifice—particularly those performed at cremation grounds, riverbanks, forests, or crossroads—while repeating the mantra is said to fulfill specific goals. An offering of Bael leaves is said to result in kingship; salt gives the power to control; turmeric gives the power to paralyze; neem twigs bring wealth; and an offering of sandalwood, camphor, and saffron together or a salt and honey mixture grants the power to attract people. A rice-flour bread prepared while repeating her mantra is said to give the power to attract women. It is likewise said that it is possible to make a person one's slave by feeding him or her the ashes of a crow whose stomach was stuffed with a conch and burnt in a cremation ground while repeating the goddess' mantra.

Leftover or partially eaten food (Uchchhishta) is recommended to be offered to Matangi with the devotee in the polluted Uchchhishta state, that is, having eaten but not washed, with the remains of food in the mouth and hands. An offering of leftovers to Hindu deities or being in the polluted Uchchhishta state is a taboo in mainstream Hinduism. Another taboo that is broken in Matangi worship is the offering to the goddess of a cloth stained with menstrual blood to gain the ability to attract a mate. Menstrual blood is considered polluted in almost all Hindu scriptures and menstruating women are kept away from Hindu worship and temples. The outcaste Matangi community of Nepal collect polluted substances and items related to death and bad luck such as sacrificial animal heads and clothes of the deceased, and offers them at special stones kept at crossroads called chwasas, where the Matangi "consumes" them as an offering, thereby getting rid of the pollution. The Tantrasara also advises offerings to Matangi of meat, fish, cooked rice, milk and incense at crossroads or cremations grounds in the dead of the night to overpower enemies and gain poetic talent. Oblations of Uchchhishta, cat meat and goat meat to the goddess are said to help achieve Supreme knowledge. A text proclaims Matangi's worship becomes fruitful only if the devotee reveres women as goddesses and refrains from criticizing them.

No fasts or rituals to purify oneself before worship—typical of Hindu worship—are prescribed for Matangi worship. Anyone can use any mantra for worship, even though he is not initiated or considered unfit for worshipping any other deity. A thousand-name hymn from the Nanayavarta-tantra and a hundred-name hymn from the Rudrayamala are dedicated to the goddess. The recitation of the Sanskrit alphabet, the chanting of mantras, the loud reading of the scriptures, and performance of music and dance are also described as constituting acts of her worship.

Devotees of Shaktism celebrate the festival of Matangi Jayanti annually by honouring and worshipping Matangi on the third day of Shukla Paksha in the month of Vaishakha.

== Temples ==
Matangi is worshipped alongside the other nine Mahavidyas at the Kamakhya Temple in Assam, one of the oldest and most sacred Shakti pithas for Tantra worship. The Modh community of Gujarat worship Matangi as Modheshwari, patron deity of their community. There is a temple dedicated to Matangi located within the Tulja Bhavani Temple complex in Maharashtra.
