= Somwar Peth =

Somwar Peth is the name of a district, in the Marathi language, in a number of Indian cities. These include cities like Pune, Solapur, Madhavnagar, Karad, Kolhapur, Ahmednagar etc. The term Somwar has derived from the day Monday in Marathi.

The Police colony in Somwar Peth, Pune was established on 20 October 1020. It used to be in the middle of dense greenery and agricultural fields for many years but is now in the heart of the city.

There is a jain temple which attracts a lot of devotees in Somwar Peth, Madhavnagar.
