= Ujjani Dam =

Ujani Dam Bhima Dam
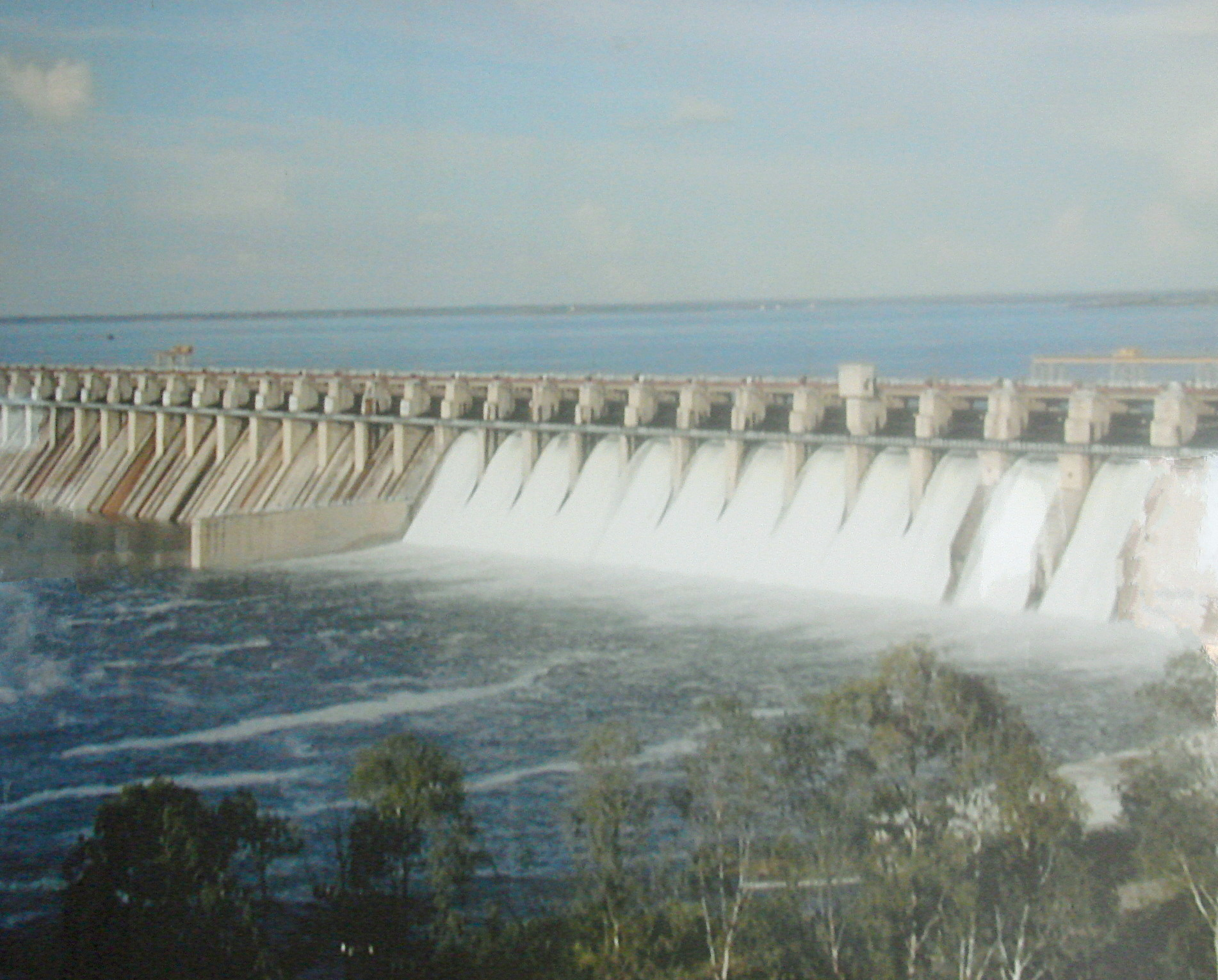
- View of Ujani or Bhima Dam and reservoir looking upstream

- Location of Ujjani Dam and Reservoir in Maharashtra
- Official name: Ujani Dam; Bhima Dam
- Location: Ujani, Indapur ,pune
- Coordinates: 18°04′26″N 75°07′12″E
- Construction began: 1969
- Opening date: June 1980
- Construction cost: Rs 8,329.6 cr (1983–84)
- Owners: Government of Maharashtra, India
- Operators: Water Resources Department, Government of Maharashtra

Dam and spillways
- Type of dam: Composite: Earthfill/Gravity
- Impounds: Bhima River
- Height: 56.4 m (185 ft)
- Length: 2,534 m (8,314 ft) (2.534 km)
- Width (crest): 6.7 m (22 ft)
- Dam volume: 3,320,000 m^{3} (4,340,000 cu yd)
- Spillways: 41 Gates
- Spillway type: Concrete
- Spillway capacity: 15,717 m^{3}/s (555,000 cu ft/s)

Reservoir
- Creates: Yashwant Sagar
- Total capacity: 3,140,000,000 m^{3} (2,550,000 acre⋅ft) (110.89 TMC)
- Active capacity: 1,440,000,000 m^{3} (1,170,000 acre⋅ft) (53 TMC)
- Inactive capacity: 1,802,000,000 m^{3} (1,461,000 acre⋅ft) (59 TMC)
- Catchment area: 14,850 km^{2} (5,730 sq mi)
- Surface area: 337 km^{2} (130 sq mi)

Power Station
- Operator: Government of Maharashtra
- Type: Pumped-storage
- Turbines: Reversible Pump Turbine
- Installed capacity: 12 MW
- Annual generation: 105 GWh initial years reducing to 21 GWh later as irrigation develops

Ujani Dam, also known as Bhima Dam or Bhima Irrigation Project, on the Bhima River, is an earthfill cum Masonry gravity dam located near Indapur of Pune District of the state of Maharashtra in India.

The Bhima River, which originates in Bhimashankar of the Western Ghats, and forms the Bhima Valley with its tributary rivers and streams, has twenty-two dams built on it of which the Ujjani Dam is the terminal dam on the river and is the largest in the valley that intercepts a catchment area of 14,858 km^{2} (5,737 sq mi) (which includes a free catchment of 9,766 km^{2} (3,771 sq mi)). The construction of the dam project including the canal system on both banks was started in 1969 at an initial estimated cost of Rs 400 million and when completed in June 1980 the cost incurred was of the order of Rs 3295.85 million.

The reservoir created by the 56.4 m (185 ft) high earth cum concrete gravity dam on the Bhima River has a gross storage capacity of 3.320 km^{3} (0.797 cu mi). The annual utilization is 2.410 km^{3} (0.578 cu mi). The project provides multipurpose benefits of irrigation, hydroelectric power, drinking, and industrial water supply and fisheries development. The irrigation supplies benefit 500 km^{2} (190 sq mi) of agricultural land, particularly in the Pune district. Water supplied from the reservoir to irrigate agricultural areas primarily aims to reduce the incidence of famines and scarcity during drought conditions. The reservoir operation also lessens the threat due to floods to cities. As a result of irrigation facilities, some of the important crops grown under irrigated conditions are sugarcane, wheat, millet and cotton.

== Geography ==
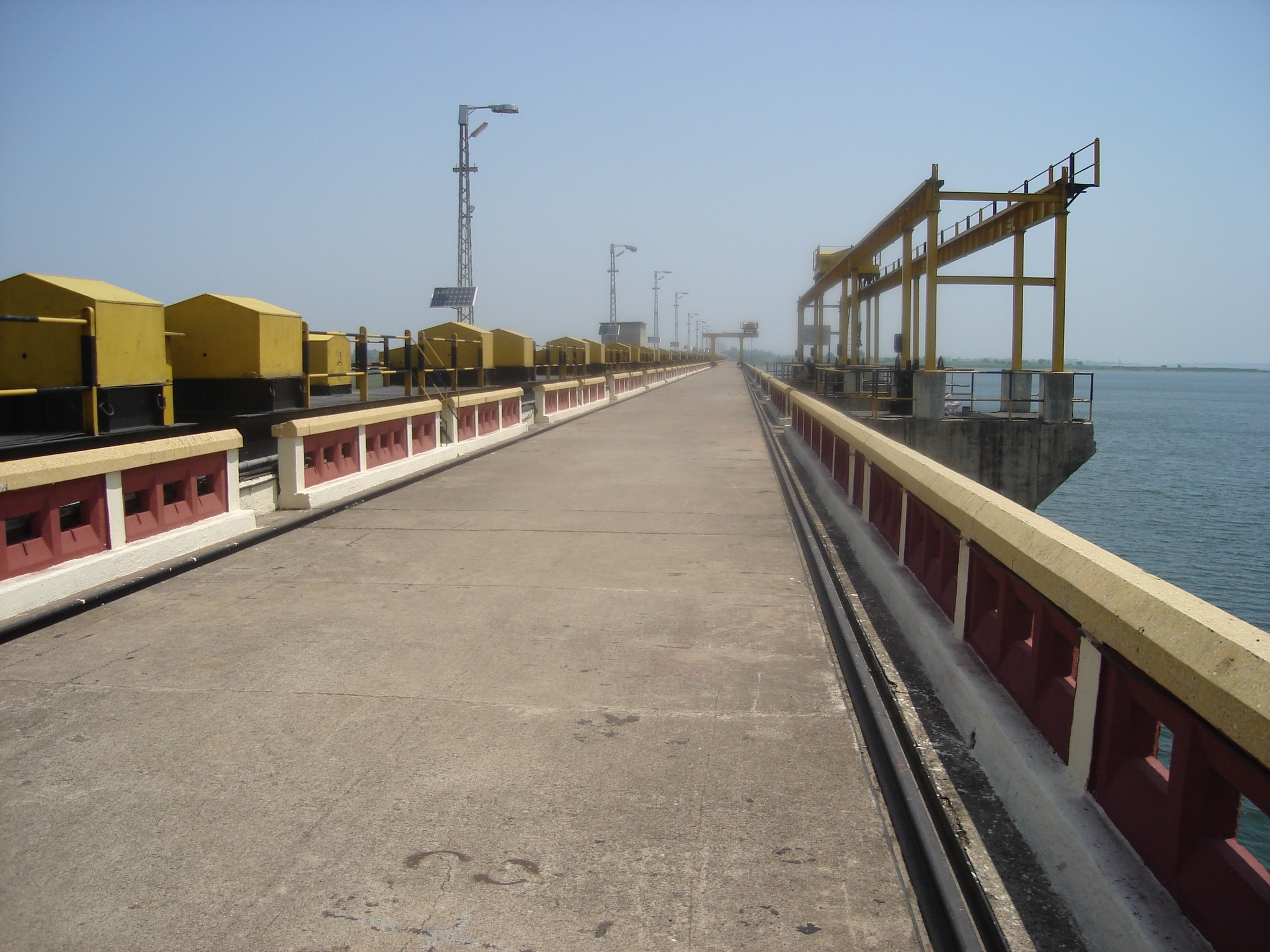
Road over the Bhima Dam

The Bhima River on which the Ujjani Dam has been built rises from Bhimashankar hills in the Western Ghats, also known as the Sahyadri hill range. The river flows for a length of 725 km (450 mi)River one of the two major river systems in Maharashtra, the other being the Godavari Rivernear Raichur in Raichur district in Karnataka. Bhima River Basin has many tributaries of which the major ones are the Kundali River, Kumandala River, Ghod river, Bhama River, Indrayani River, Mula River, Mutha River, Pavna River, Bori, Sina, Man, Bhogwati and Nira. The total drainage area of 48,631 km^{2} (18,777 sq mi) of Bhima River basin, an inter state river basin, covers both Maharashtra (75%) and Karnataka (25%) states, out of which 14,858 km^{2} (5,737 sq mi) drains into the Ujjani Reservoir created by the Ujjani Dam. The Upper Bhima River basin is subdivided into three zones namely northern, middle and southern, the main stem of the river is in the middle zone where the Bhima Dam is built, while the southern zone is dominated by five reservoirs. The basin above the dam has intense rural, agricultural, urban and industrial activities. The river basin, which has a slope from west to east has extreme physiographic and agro-climatic variations. The drainage basin has rich and fertile agricultural land, and several water resources development projects have been built on its river system. Government of Maharashtra has classified the stretches of the Upper Bhima River for the purpose of various uses as, A-I for drinking water without conventional treatment but after disinfection, A-II Drinking water after conventional treatment followed by disinfection, A-III for fish and wildlife propagation and A-IV for agriculture, industrial cooling and process. The dam and the reservoir are approachable from Pune city, which is 160 km (99 mi) away. The dam is about 5 mi (8.0 km) upstream of the bridge across the Bhima River on the Pune-Sholapur Road.

=== Climate ===
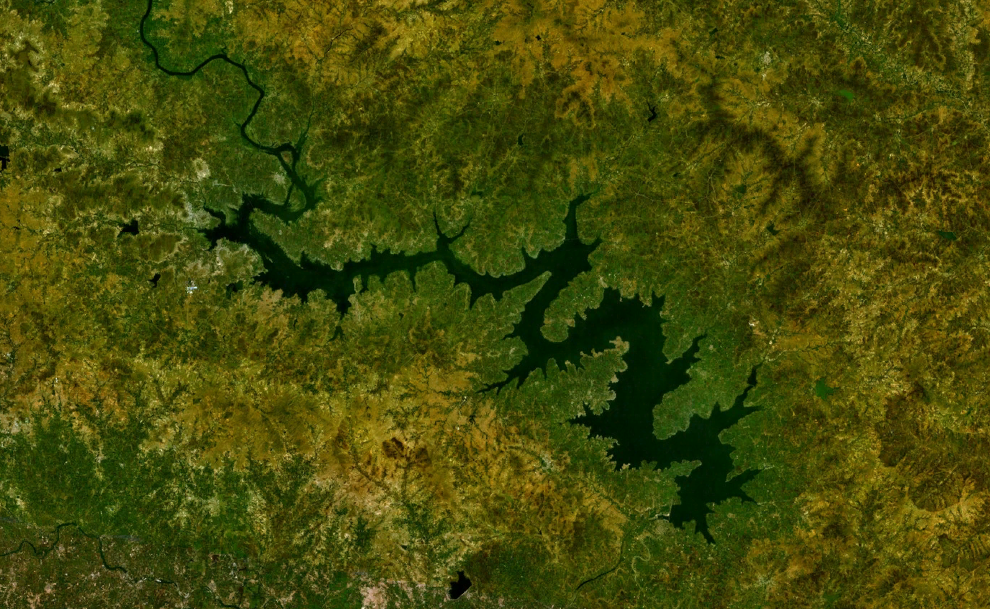
The reservoir as seen from a satellite

The basin experiences tropical monsoon climatic conditions. The rainfall is dictated by the southwest monsoon, which varies from 6,000–3,000 mm (240–120 in) (from South to North) near the North–South trending mountain range of the basin but drastically drops to 700 mm (28 in) within a distance of 70 km (43 mi) towards the east. The average annual precipitation of the basin above the dam in the Upper Bhima River Basin (UBB) has been assessed as 1,096 mm (43.1 in) out of which 945 mm (37.2 in) (87%) occurs during the four monsoon months (mid June to mid September). Thereafter, the basin falls under the rain shadow area towards the east with rainfall incidence ranging between 450–600 mm (18–24 in) and is thus under drought conditions quite frequently.

== Hydrology ==
Based on rainfall data and other characteristics of the basin, the average annual yield of the Upper Bhima River basin has been assessed as 7.373 km^{3} (1.769 cu mi). the flows are shared by the Upper riparian state of Maharashtra with the lower riparian Karnataka state. its award in the year 1976 permitted Maharashtra to use only 4.753 km^{3} (1.140 cu mi) from the Upper Bhima River Basin. The Bhima or Ujjani dam has a planned annual utilization of 1.878 km^{3} (0.451 cu mi) (including evaporation losses).

== Features ==
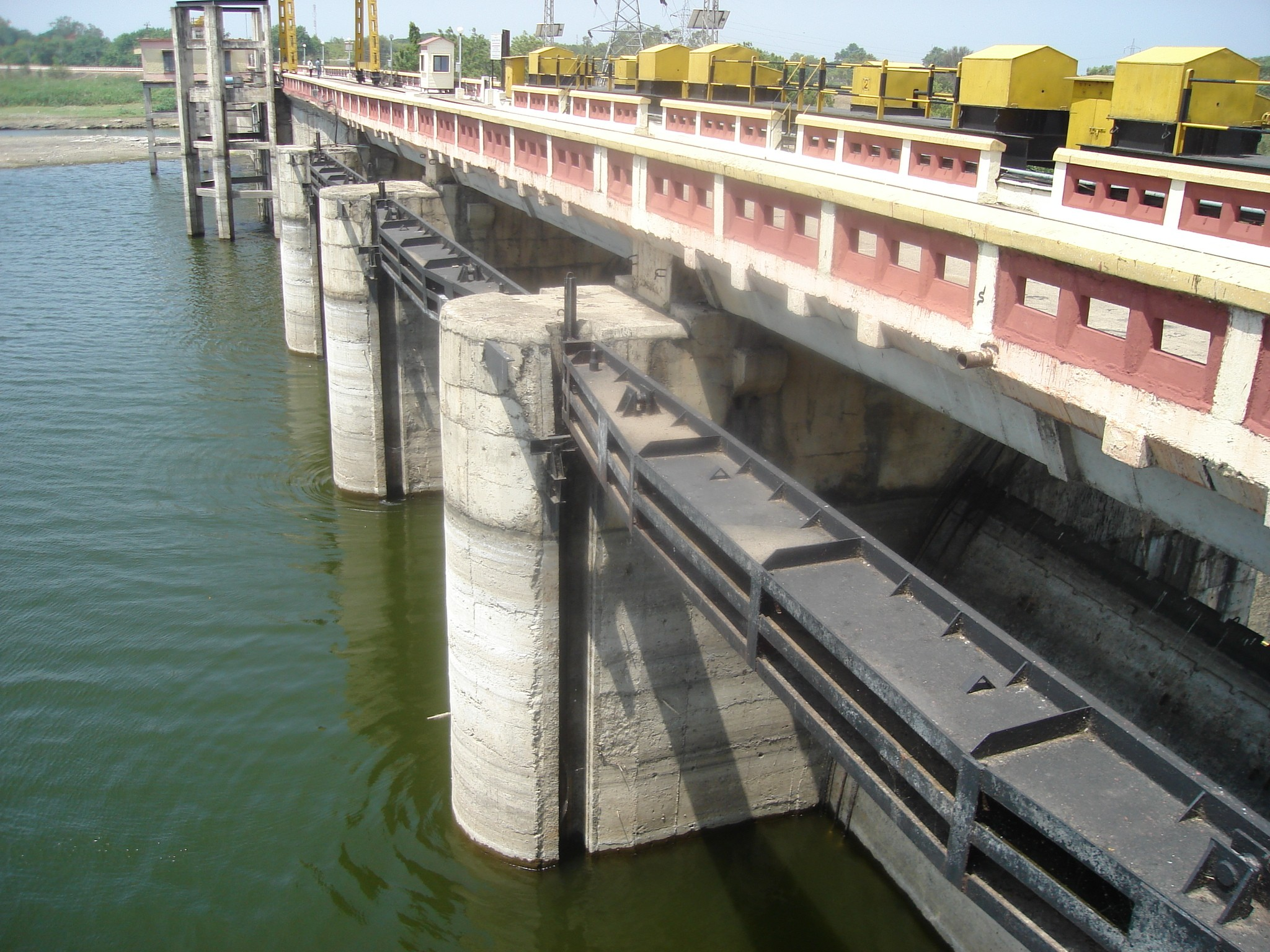
Gate Controlled Spillway of Bhima or Ujjani Dam

The Ujjani Dam commissioned in June 1980 is an earth cum concrete masonry dam, which has created a multipurpose reservoir. The total length of the dam is 2,534 m (8,314 ft), which comprises a central portion which is the spillway dam of 602 m (1,975 ft) length, of concrete gravity section of 56.4 m (185 ft) (maximum height above the deepest foundation level). The spillway is flanked by Non Overflow (NOF) concrete gravity dams of 314 m (1,030 ft) length. Earth dam sections flank the NOF dams on the left and right banks. The volume content of the dams is 3.320 km^{3} (0.797 cu mi). The gross storage capacity created is 3.320 km^{3} (0.797 cu mi) at the Full Reservoir Level (FRL) of 497.58 m (1,632.5 ft). The spillway, structure has an Ogee shaped downstream slope designed to dispose a design flood discharge of 15,717 m^{3}/s (555,000 cu ft/s) (the maximum probable flood discharge of 18,013 m^{3}/s (636,100 cu ft/s) and a breaching section is provided between the NOF block and the earth dam section, controlled by 41 radial gates of 12 m (39 ft)x6.5 m (21 ft) size erected over the crest of the dam. In addition, four river sluices (gate controlled) are also provided in the body of the spillway pier numbers 3, 4, 5 and 6 with outlet level at 470 m (1,540 ft), with each sluice designed for a discharge capacity of 60 m^{3}/s (2,100 cu ft/s) for silt flushing. The energy dissipation arrangements on the downstream slope of the spillway is in the form of high level and low level slotted roller bucket type. Measuring instruments have been installed in the body of the dam to record and analyse various parameters related to the behaviour of the dam over the years as part of the dam safety programme The dam is founded on massive basaltic rock formations.

=== Reservoir ===
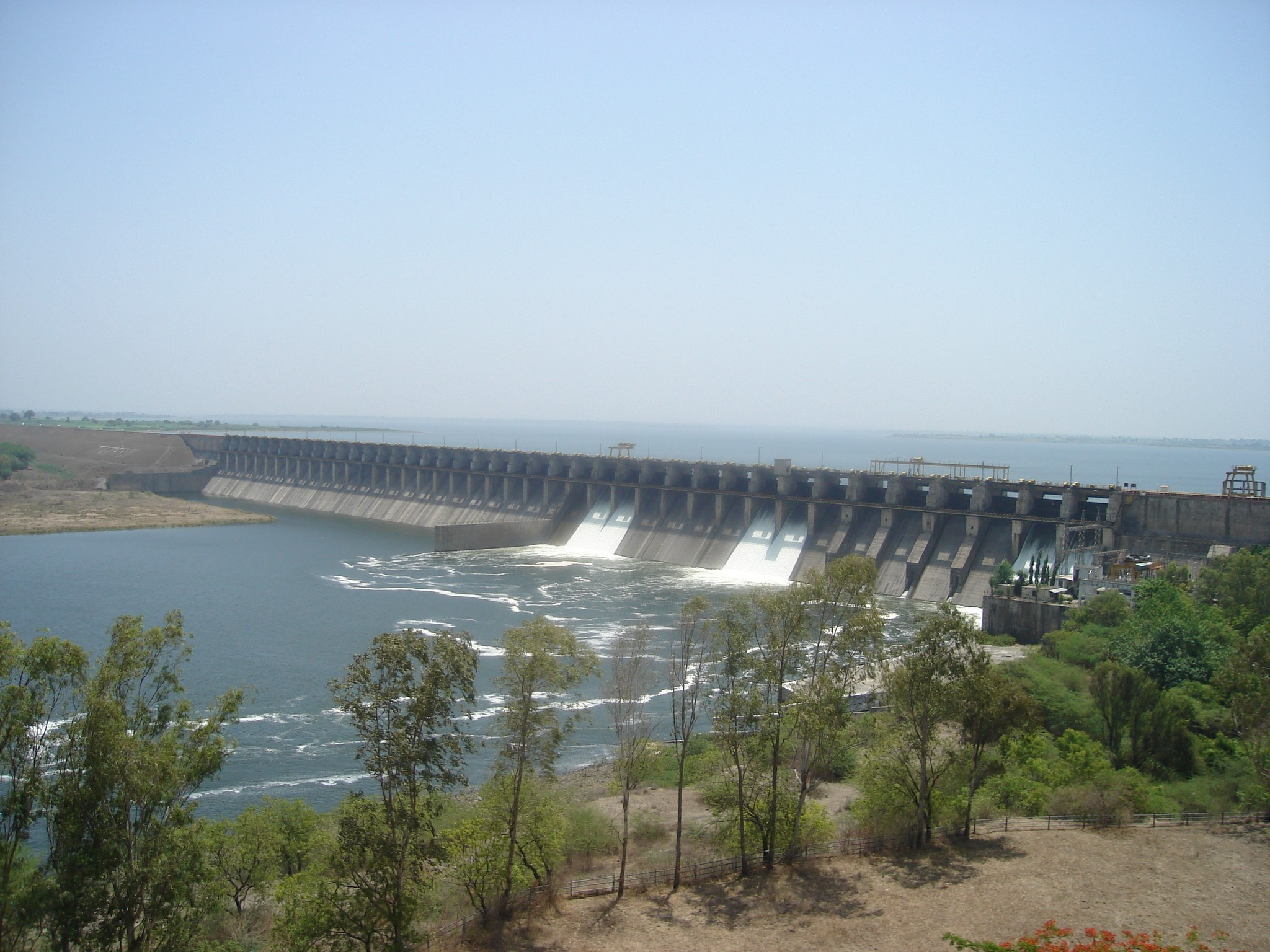
Panoramic view of Ujjani or Bhima Dam and the reservoir

The reservoir created by the dam has a water spread area of 357 km^{2} (138 sq mi) at the High Flood Level (HFL) and 336.5 km^{2} (129.9 sq mi) at Full Reservoir Level causing submergence of land and houses in 82 villages. The reservoir stretches upstream of the dam to a length of around 50 km, and the maximum width of the reservoir is 8 km (5.0 mi). The rim of the reservoir periphery measures 670 km (420 mi).

As a result of reservoir submergence, realignment of railway line (of the Daund Solapur section) to a length of 33.251 km (20.661 mi), realignment of National Highway No. 9 between Pune and Solapur sector over a length of 23.4 km (14.5 mi), and the to the extent of 15.35 km (9.54 mi) was involved.

Two years after the commissioning of the project, the reservoir water quality was tested to establish its suitability for various uses. The physical and chemical analysis indicated that the pH values, free carbon dioxide, total hardness, alkalinity, nitrates, nitrites, chlorides, sulphates, calcium and magnesium were within prescribed limits. Heavy metals, copper and lead were not present. However, during the rainy season, the iron content though high, was found to be within permissible limits. Potassium and ammonia were within prescribed safe limits of acceptance for use of stored water for drinking, industrial use and for fish propagation. However, since its creation in 1980, it is now recorded that substantial quantity of the untreated sewage is discharged into the streams which flow into the Ujjani Reservoir, particularly in the river stretch close to the Pune city.

The reservoir created by the Ujjani dam is also one of the largest backwaters in India, Since its creation in 1980, the reservoir backwaters attract, every year, a large number of migratory birds (from North India and other countries); about 100–150 species of flamingos and cormorants are reported. The migratory bird species in the Ujjani reservoir have been studied by the Science and Technology Park (STP), a Pune-based institution. Some of the key species which are found around backwaters are: greater flamingos, pheasant-tailed jacana, painted stork, moorhen, small pratincole, river terns, aquatic insects, pied kingfisher and stilts.

== Benefits ==
The Ujjani Dam and its large reservoir provide multi-purpose benefits of irrigation, hydroelectric power generation, drinking and industrial water supply, and fisheries.

=== Irrigation ===
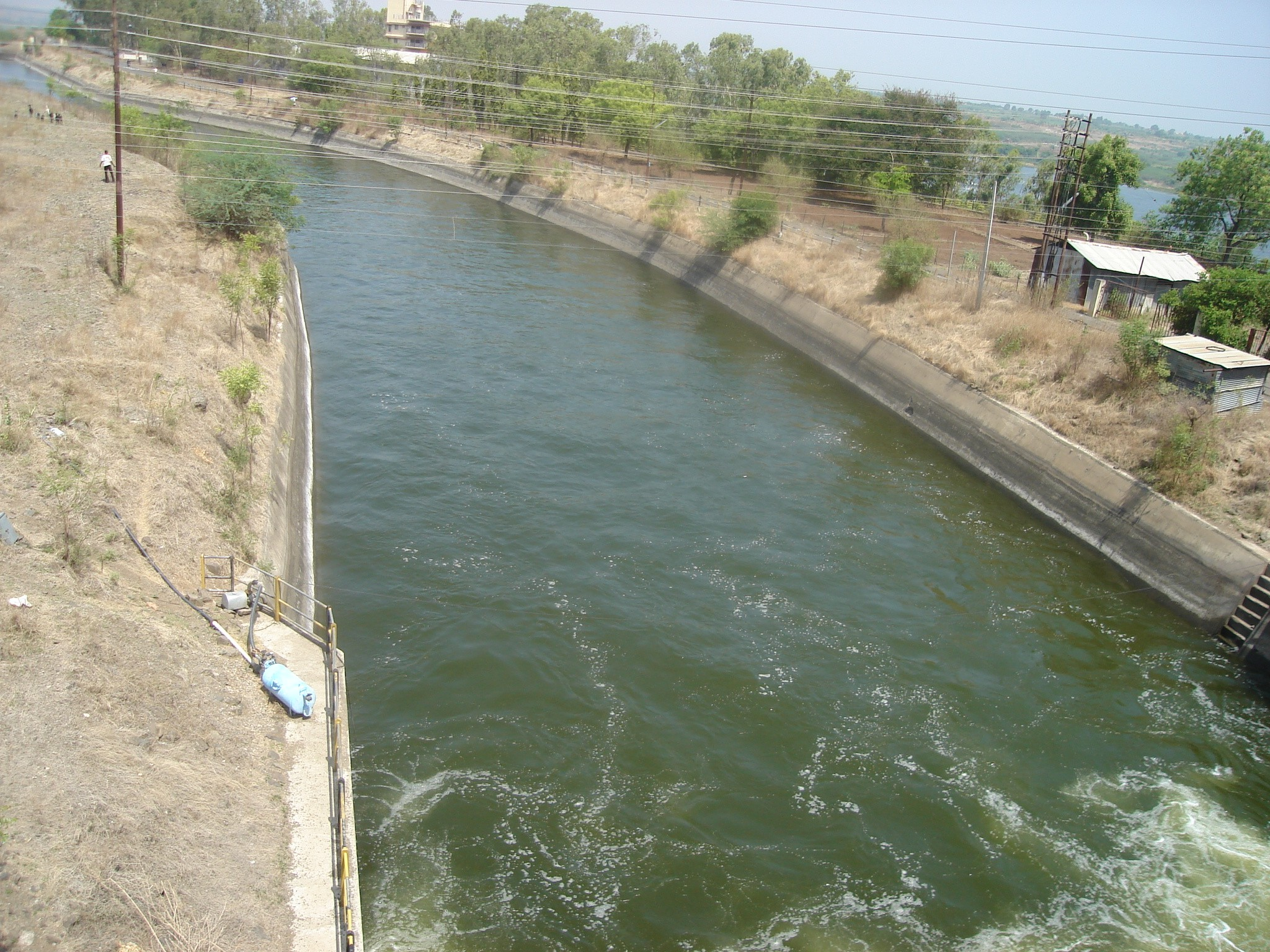
Left bank irrigation canal from the Ujjani Dam

Irrigation from the storage created in the reservoir are provided via two irrigation canal systems originating from the dam – The Left Bank Main Canal (LBMC) and The Right Bank Main canal (RBMC) – the LBMC is 126 km (78 mi) long, designed to carry a discharge of 109 m^{3}/s (3,800 cu ft/s) and provides irrigation to a command of 688.4 km^{2} (265.8 sq mi) while the RBMC, which is 112 km (70 mi) long, designed to carry 42.5 m^{3}/s (1,500 cu ft/s) provides irrigation benefits to an area of 44,100 m^{3}/s (1,560,000 cu ft/s) through its network of canal system.

Bhima to Sina interlink (Jod Kalava) with 21 km long tunnel from Ujjani reservoir is constructed to supply water for vast lands in catchment area of Sina tributary.

The storage created by the Ujjani Dam has resulted in the irrigation of 500 km^{2} (190 sq mi), particularly in Pune District, resulting in doubling the yield of sorghum (jowar) and tripling the yield of groundnut. Farmers management organizations set up in the command area of the project are an important component of equitable distribution of irrigation under the rotational irrigation water management practice followed in the command. The irrigation component of the Ujjani Dam project was co-financed by IFAD and the World Bank with specific objective to enhance the social and economic conditions of the Scheduled castes and Scheduled tribe people in the command.

== Hydropower ==
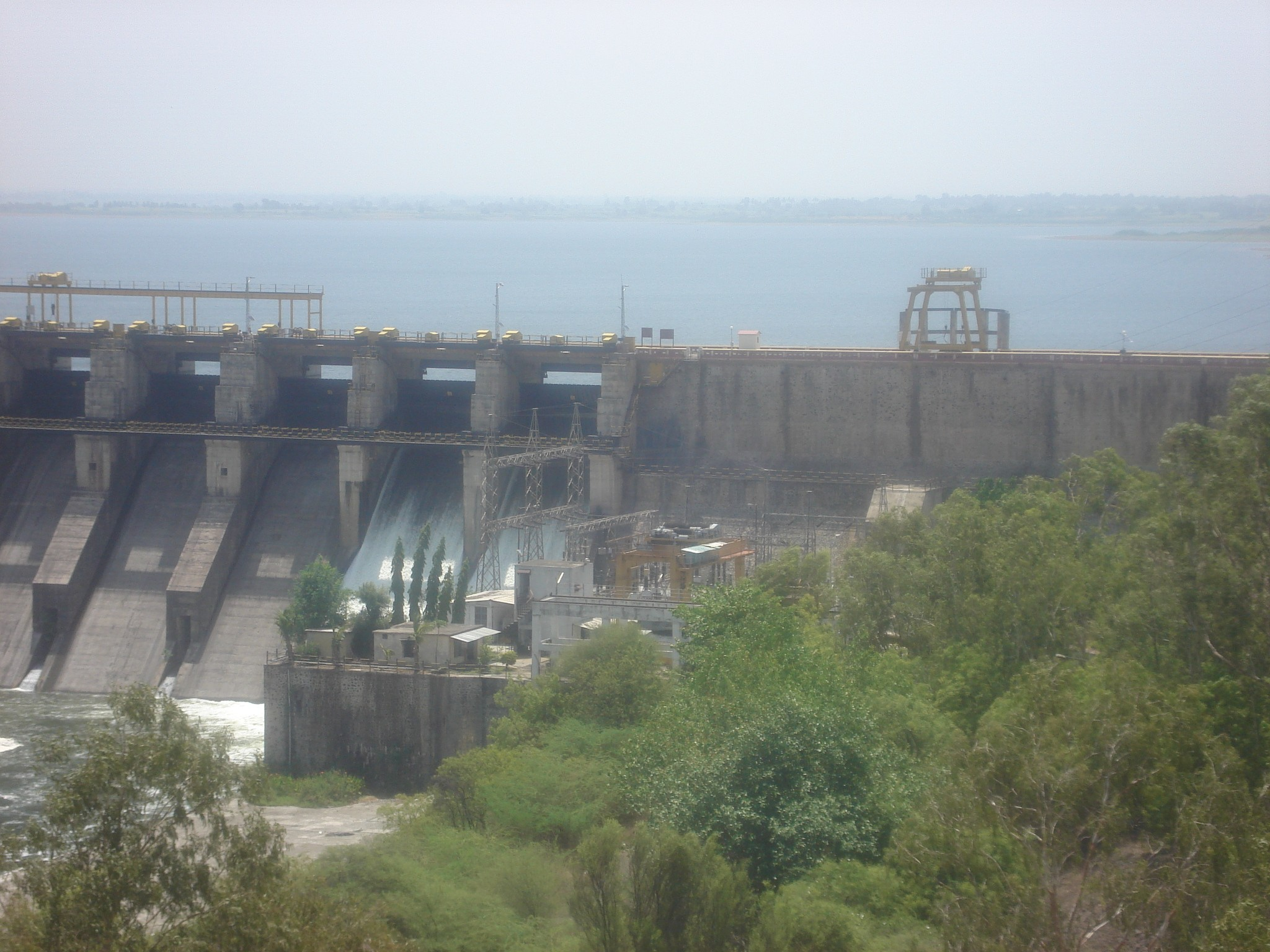
The 12 MW pumped storage powerhouse at the toe of the dam on the left bank

A pumped storage type powerhouse has been built at the toe of the dam with an installed capacity of 12 MW (one unit of vertical Francis-reversible pump turbine) on the left bank of the dam, 65 m (213 ft) downstream from the axis of the dam. It operates below 20 percent load factor under a range of maximum head of 36.77 m (120.6 ft) and minimum head of 25.6 m (84 ft). The hydropower component involved construction of a 13.42 m (44.0 ft) high weir, 915 m (3,002 ft) below the Ujjani Dam to control the lower pond for operation during the pumping mode. A penstock pipe of 3.2 m (10 ft) diameter (12 mm (0.47 in) thick) and 70 m (230 ft) length embedded in the dam diverts the flow of 44 m^{3}/s (1,600 cu ft/s) from a gate controlled trash racks (15 panels) covered intake into the powerhouse. The lower pond in the pumped storage scheme of operation was built initially itself, soon after commissioning of the dam. The power plant is reported to be providing benefits since then. However, the power generation estimated initially at 105 GWh was expected to reduce to 21 GWh, as water was utilized for irrigation through the RBC and LBC canal systems.

During the drought year 2015, the inflows into the reservoir were very meagre due to the failure of rains in the catchment area. However, nearly 36 tmcft dead storage water available in the reservoir could not be used for the dire needs. With minor external modifications to the exiting reversible hydro turbine unit, all the dead storage water can be put to use during the drought years by using the hydro power plant for pumping water into the nearby left canal. Water would be released downstream into the tail pond through the existing river sluice gates. The pen stock of the hydro power unit is extended (less than 100 m long) to connect to the nearby left canal. The hydro power unit is operated in pumping mode to pump water from the tail pond to the left canal when the reservoir level is below the canal's minimum draw down level (MDDL). The pen stock extension piping is detached when water pumping to the canal is not required to restore its normal power generation when the reservoir level is above the left canal's MDDL

== Other benefits ==
The high density of phytoplankton (of many species) in the Ujjani Reservoir is conducive to proliferation of fish species. Production of fish resources from the reservoir has been estimated at 712 tonnes per year, and 19 percent of the catch consists species of major carps. Fish yield is reported to be 2450 kg/km^{2} of the water spread area of the reservoir.

== Bird watching ==
With the water reservoir of Ujani Dam, Bhigwan is a small town developed on the Pune-Solapur Highway around 105 km from Pune which is on the backwaters of Ujani dam. Bhigwan is famous for birdwatching especially flamingos and wild life photography. It is also known as mini Bharatpur. Many kinds of Ducks, Herons, Egrets, Raptors and Waders along with flocks of hundreds of flamingos can be seen. Variety of birds at Bhigwan gives of sighting of almost all the prime bird species there and also creates great photographic opportunities for wildlife photographers. At times, 1,000-1,200 flamingos are seen. The low rains and low water level has now reduced the number of flamingos over some years. It is a favorite spot for migratory birds, with more than 230 species found here. One can see flamingos, painted storks, bar-headed geese, demoiselle cranes, etc. These birds can be seen in the winter season between December and March. The bird generally migrates via marine routes and adult females depart from the breeding grounds .

== See also ==
- List of dams and reservoirs in Maharashtra
- List of dams and reservoirs in India
- Krishna Water Disputes Tribunal
