= Chaskaman Dam =

- Location of Chaskaman Dam in Maharashtra
- Interactive map of Chaskaman Dam
- Official name: Chaskaman Dam
- Location: Maharashtra; India
- Coordinates: 18°57′39″N 73°47′8″E
- Opening date: 2002
- Construction cost: 388Cr
- Owner: Government of Maharashtra

Dam and spillways
- Type of dam: Rubble-concrete dam
- Impounds: Bhima River
- Height: 46 m (151 ft)
- Length: 738 m (2,421 ft)
- Width (base): 72 m (236 ft)
- Spillway capacity: 3962 cubic meters/sec

Reservoir
- Total capacity: 249.69 million cubic meters (gross)
- Website http://wrd.maharashtra.gov.in

The Chaskaman Dam is one of the important dams of Maharashtra and is built on the Bhima River at Rajgurunagar in Pune district. It is located across river Bhima in Krishna basin near Village Bibi in Khed taluka. The main purpose of this dam was to improve irrigation and supply of electricity to the nearby villages. It is the second Hydel Greenfield power project in the country that is capable of captive power as well. The power will be utilized through the state power board. The project was completed during 2008-09.

== Details ==
In the year 1977, the Chas Kaman Irrigation project was approved by the Planning Commission of India. The budget of Rs. 22.47 Crore was approved for building this irrigation and hydroelectric project. This project construction was started in the month of July in year 2002. The final cost of completion of the dam is believed to be around Rs.388 crores. The dam is about 738 meters in length and the masonry dam of 220 meters length. The maximum height of the dam from its lowest foundation level is approximately 46 meters. The dam has five radial gates with a spillway of approximately 72 meters. The reservoir holds about 241 MCM of water of which 214 MCM is approved for use for irrigation purpose. The depth of the dam is about 150 meters. The capacity of Chas Kaman Dam to irrigate about 32824 ha of land of the villages nearby in Pune district. The dam and the surrounding areas receive rainfall from southwest monsoon from the month of June to September. It is having minimum down level of the 634 meters and is designed to generate about six million power units. During monsoons, the dam is full with a gross storage capacity of nearly 250 MCM(million cubic meters)(7.58 tmc ft). In fact, this is being used for drinking as well as irrigation purposes.

== Places nearby ==
1. Bhimashankar Wildlife Sanctuary
2. The Jyotirling at Bhimashankar
3. Wada

== See also ==
- Dams in Maharashtra
- List of power stations in India
- List of conventional hydroelectric power stations
