= Siddhegavhan =

Village in Maharashtra

Siddhegavhan Shinde Gavhan, Shindegavhan, Siddegavhan
- village
- Location in Maharashtra, India Siddhegavhan (India)
- Coordinates: 18°42′15″N 074°00′10″E
- Country: India
- State: Maharashtra
- District: Pune
- Taluka: Khed

Government
  - Body: Village panchayat

Population (2001)
  - Total: 706

Languages
  - Official: Marathi
- Time zone: UTC+5:30 (IST)

Siddhegavhan is a panchayat village in the state of Maharashtra, India, on the left (east) bank of the Bhima River. Administratively, Siddhegavhan is under Khed Taluka of Pune District in Maharashtra. There is only the single village of Siddhegavhan in the Shinde Gavhan gram panchayat. The village of Siddhegavhan is 10.5 km southeast by road of the village of Pimpalgaon Tarf Khed, and 21 km by road west of the town of Shikrapur.

== Demographics ==
In the 2001 census, the village of Siddhegavhan had 706 inhabitants, with 363 males (51.4%) and 343 females (48.6%), for a gender ratio of 945 females per thousand males.
