= Khandas =

Village in Maharashtra

Khandas is a small village in Maharashtra India approximately 34 km from Karjat station.

It is the starting point for the trek to Bhimashanker. It takes approximately 4 hours to reach Bhimashanker from Khandas village via Ganesh Ghat which is an easier route. The other route to Bhimashanker from Khandas is via Sidi Ghat which is a shorter route compared to Ganesh Ghat but quite tough, especially during Monsoon. Khandas village is in itself a very beautiful place. Regular Taxis, Buses, Three Wheelers etc. are available from Karjat for Khandas. Local guides are also regularly available for Bhimashankar journey.
