= Chas, Khed =

Village in Maharashtra

Chas
- village
- Location in Maharashtra, India Chas (India)
- Coordinates: 18°55′19″N 073°50′00″E
- Country: India
- State: Maharashtra
- District: Pune
- Taluka: Khed

Government
  - Body: Village panchayat

Population (2001)
  - Total: 2,480

Languages
  - Official: Marathi
- Time zone: UTC+5:30 (IST)

Chas is a panchayat village in the state of Maharashtra, India, on the left (east) bank of the Bhima River. Administratively, Chas is under Khed Taluka of Pune District in Maharashtra. There is only the single village of Chas in the Chas gram panchayat. The village of Chas is 16 km southeast of the Chas-Kaman Dam, and 14 km by road northwest of the town of Rajgurunagar (Khed).

== Demographics ==
In the 2001 census, the village of Chas in Khed Taluka had 2,480 inhabitants, with 1,260 males (50.8%) and 1,220 females (49.2%), for a gender ratio of 968 females per thousand males.
