= Aralakalmodi Dam =

- Interactive map of Aralakalmodi Dam
- Official name: Aralakalmodi Dam
- Location: Khed
- Coordinates: 18.998947°N 73.6711201°E
- Opening date: 2007
- Owners: Government of Maharashtra, India

Dam and spillways
- Type of dam: Gravity
- Impounds: Arala river
- Height: 40.6 m (133 ft)
- Length: 104 m (341 ft)
- Dam volume: 139,000 m^{3} (4,900,000 cu ft)

Reservoir
- Total capacity: 42.67×10^{6} m^{3} (1.507×10^{9} cu ft)
- Surface area: 2.71×10^{6} m^{2} (29.2×10^{6} sq ft)

Aralakalmodi Dam or Kalmodi Dam is a gravity dam on the Arala river near Khed taluka, Pune in state of Maharashtra in India.

== Specifications ==
The height of the dam above its lowest foundation is 40.6 m (133 ft) while the length is 104 m (341 ft). The volume content is 139,000 m^{3} (4,900,000 cu ft) and the gross storage capacity is 42.67×10^{6} m^{3} (1.507×10^{9} cu ft).

== Purpose ==
- Irrigation

== See also ==
- Dams in Maharashtra
- List of reservoirs and dams in India
