= Sherechiwadi =

Small Indian village

Sherechiwadi Anandgaon
- Village
- Location in Maharashtra, India Sherechiwadi (India)
- Coordinates: 17°56′38″N 74°11′26″E
- Country: India
- State: Maharashtra
- District: Satara
- Taluka: Phaltan
- Established: 1962

Government
  - Type: Gram Panchayat
  - Sarpanch: Ranjana Ganpat Kanse (2023)

Area
  - Total: 7.689027 km^{2} (2.968750 sq mi)
- Elevation: 569 m (1,867 ft)

Population (2022)
  - Total: 1,256
- Demonym: Sherewadikar

Official
  - Language: Marathi
- Time zone: UTC+5:30 (IST)
- PIN: 415521
- Telephone code: 02162

Sherechiwadi is a small village located in the state of Maharashtra in western India.

== Demographics ==
Sherechiwadi is a small village located in the Satara district of Maharashtra, India. According to the 2011 Census of India, the total population of Sherechiwadi was 930, with 477 males and 453 females.

The village has a literacy rate of approximately 70%, with a higher literacy rate among males (80%) compared to females (60%). The primary language spoken in Sherechiwadi is Marathi, which is the official language of the state of Maharashtra.

== Geography ==
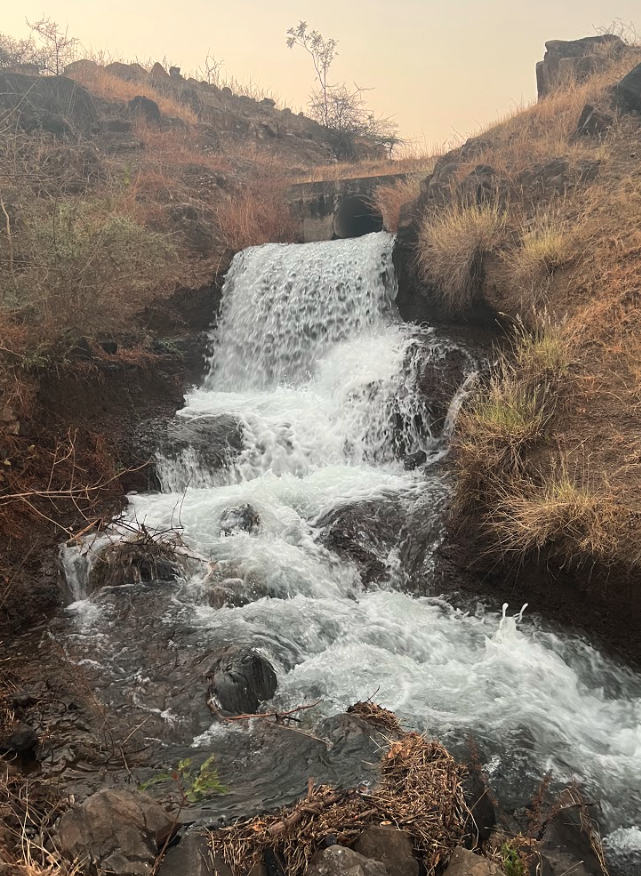
Rapids near Sherechiwadi

Sherechiwadi is a small village located in the Satara district of the state of Maharashtra in western India. It is situated in the Sahyadri mountain range and is surrounded by lush green hills, valleys, and forests.

The village is located at an elevation of approximately 450 meters above sea level and has a warm and humid climate, with temperatures ranging from 25-30 °C in the summer months and 15-20 °C in the winter months.

The main water source for the village is the Kundali River, which flows through the area and provides water for irrigation and drinking purposes. The river also serves as an important source of fish and other aquatic life for the villagers.

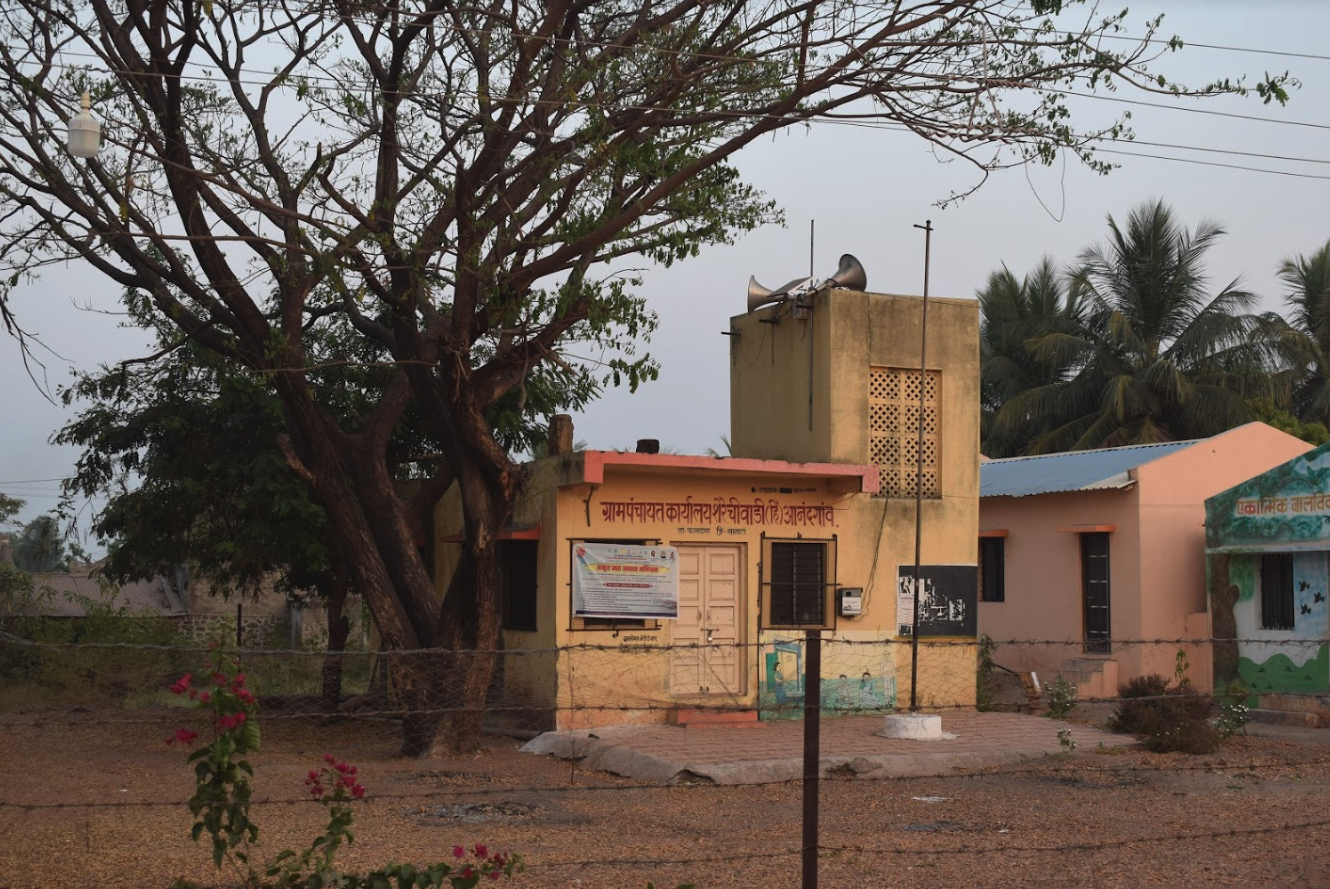
Gram Panchayat's Office, Sherechiwadi
