= Bhogavati River =

Coordinates: 16°44′N 74°11′E

Location
- Country: India

Physical characteristics
- Source
  - location: Osmanabad
  - elevation: 2,190 ft (670 m)

Basin features
- River system: Sina River

Bhogawati River is a large tributary of the Sina River which originates near Osmanabad city of Maharashtra, India. Bhogavati meets Sina near Mohol in Solapur district of Maharashtra. Sina River is a tributary of Bhima River.

Bhogawati rises in the south-facing scarps of the Balaghat range in the north-eastern parts of Barshi taluka and after a south-westerly course of about 65 km. through Barshi and Madha, falls into the Sina, about 7 km. north of Mohol. It is about 30 metres broad and has a slender stream during the low water. Its main source streams are the Bodki, the Nagsari and the Sira all of which rise in the Balaghat hills and run south-east. All these feeder streams keep the stream running practically throughout the year.

== The Sina-Bhogawati Valley ==
The Sina valley occupies roughly the eastern third of Sholapur district in eastern Karmala, western Barshi, eastern Madha, central Mohol and North and South Sholapur talukas. The valley is narrow and more rugged in the north and opens out, south of Mohol to become about 50 km. wide in the central and southern sections. Apart from the Sina, the Bhogawati and other less important tributaries have also formed fairly extensive tributary valleys. In parts of Barshi, low hills dot the area; otherwise it is a broad waving plateau sloping towards the Sina river in the middle.
