= Sina River =

Coordinates: 17°23′N 75°54′E

Location
- Country: India
- Region: Maharashtra

Physical characteristics
- Source
  - location: Ahilyanagar
  - elevation: 649 m (2,129 ft)
- Mouth
  - location: Bhima River
  - elevation: 774 m asl
- Length: 315 km (196 mi)
- Basin size: 666.16 sq. Km

Basin features
- River system: Bhima river
- Tributaries
  - left: Bhogavati, Gorda, Vinacharna, Mankarna, Sher, Kadi
  - right: Mehekari

Sina River is the longest tributary of the Bhima river which is starting near Ahilya nagar city. It has two chief sources, one near Jamgaon about 20 km. west of the town of Ahilya Nagar and the other near Sasewadi, Jeur about 16 km. to its north-east. For a distance of about 315 km. roughly, the river forms boundary between Ahilya Nagar District on the one hand and Beed district on the other. On the right, it receives the waters of Mahekri, and ultimately joins the Bhima on the Karnataka State border. It has earth filled Sina Dam near Karjat in Ahilya Nagar District.

== Details ==
The Sina, one of the large left-bank feeders of the Bhima, rises 22 km. west of Torna in Ahilya nagar district and runs south east through Ahilyanagar and Solapur district to fall into the Bhima near Kudul about 25 km. south of Solapur, on the Maharashtra and Karnataka boundary. Of its entire length of 180 km, the river has a length of 177 km within the district. About 7 km. north of Mohol, the river receives the Bhogavati river on its left bank. Another small tributary on the left bank is the Gorda nadi joining the Sina east of Madha. The Sina is about 100–200 metres broad and has steep banks. The bed is generally sandy but occasionally rocky. While upstream of Mohol, the river flows through a narrow valley, downstream it opens out widely to merge into the broad valley of Bhima. The Sina is crossed by five ferries, one in Madha at Kolgaon, and four in Solapur at Lamboti, Tirha, Vaddukbal and Vangi.

Ahmed Nizamshah Bahiri established Ahmednagar in 1490 A.D on the banks on Sina River. The Iron Bridge on this river near the railway station was more than 100 years old. Bagroja tomb dedicated to Ahmed Nizamshah and his wife, located on the banks of the Sina River.

Bhima to Sina interlink (Jod Kalava) with 21-km tunnel from Ujjani reservoir is constructed to supply water for vast lands in catchment area of Sina from main Bhima river. Number of barrages are constructed downstream on the Sina river.
