= Veer Dam =

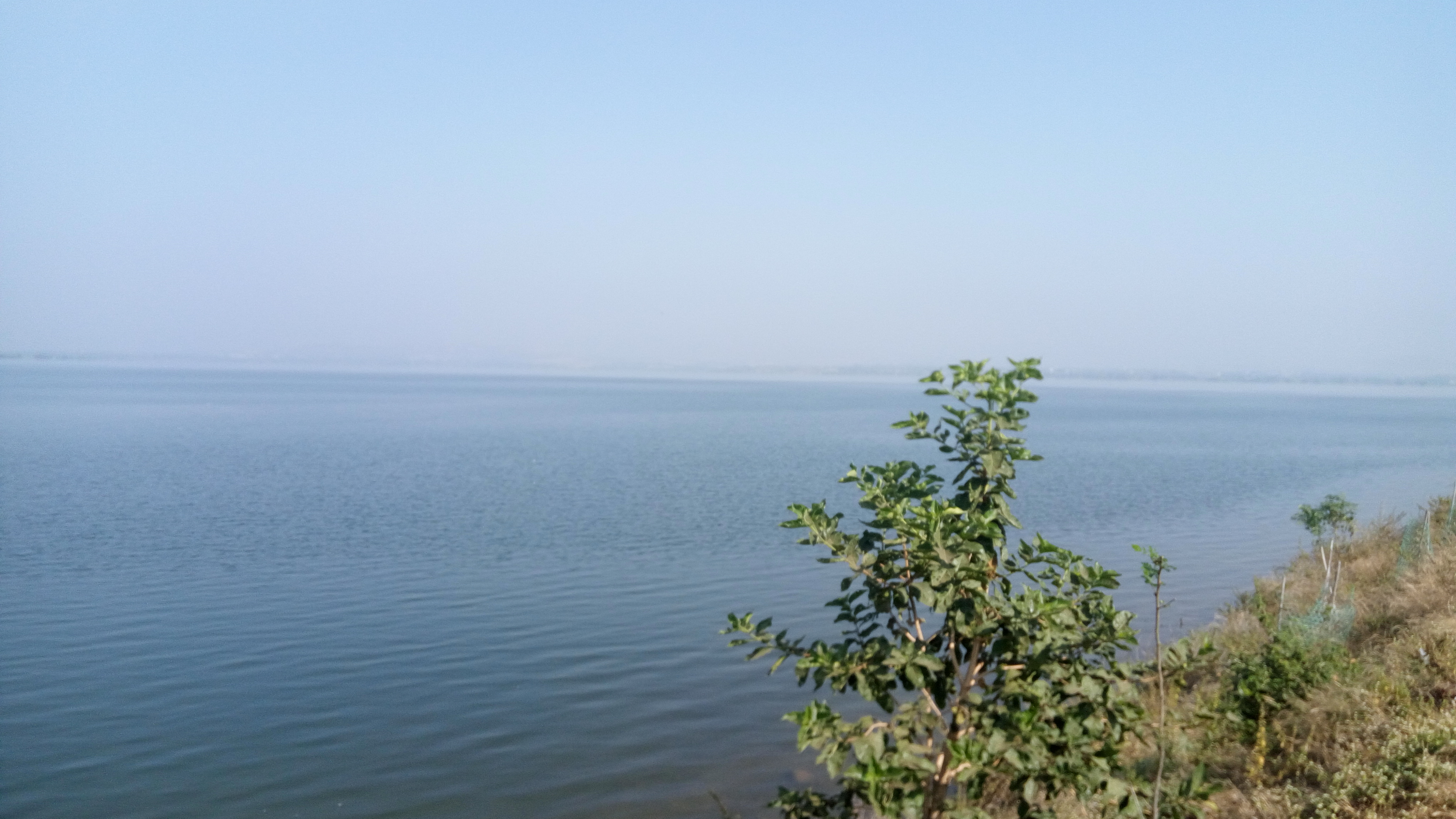
- Veer Dam

- Location of Veer Dam in Maharashtra
- Official name: Veer Dam
- Location: Maharashtra; India
- Coordinates: 18°13′00″N 74°07′00″E
- Opening date: 1965
- Owner: Government of Maharashtra

Dam and spillways
- Type of dam: Rubble-concrete dam
- Impounds: Nira River

Reservoir
- Total capacity: 266 million m3

Power Station
- Installed capacity: 9 MW (2 x 4.5 MW)
- Website http://wrd.maharashtra.gov.in

The Veer Dam is one of the important dams in Maharashtra, India. It is a rubble-concrete dam constructed on Nira River. It is located in near Shirwal, Satara district. The water is mainly used for irrigation and farming. The dam is located around 70 km from Pune. This place offers a good stretch of 7–8 km along the river Nira. This entire belt along the river is extremely rich with Avifauna.

== Details ==
The main purpose of the dam is hydroelectricity with some irrigation in neighboring areas. It is at the border of Pune district and Satara district. Veer Dam has now become a key bird-watching spot around Pune. This includes the Bar-headed Geese & Demoiselle Cranes. There are over 170 different species of birds at Veer Dam. Also there are waders, raptors as well as flycatchers in and around Veer Dam.

== See also ==
- Dams in Maharashtra
- List of power stations in India
- List of conventional hydroelectric power stations

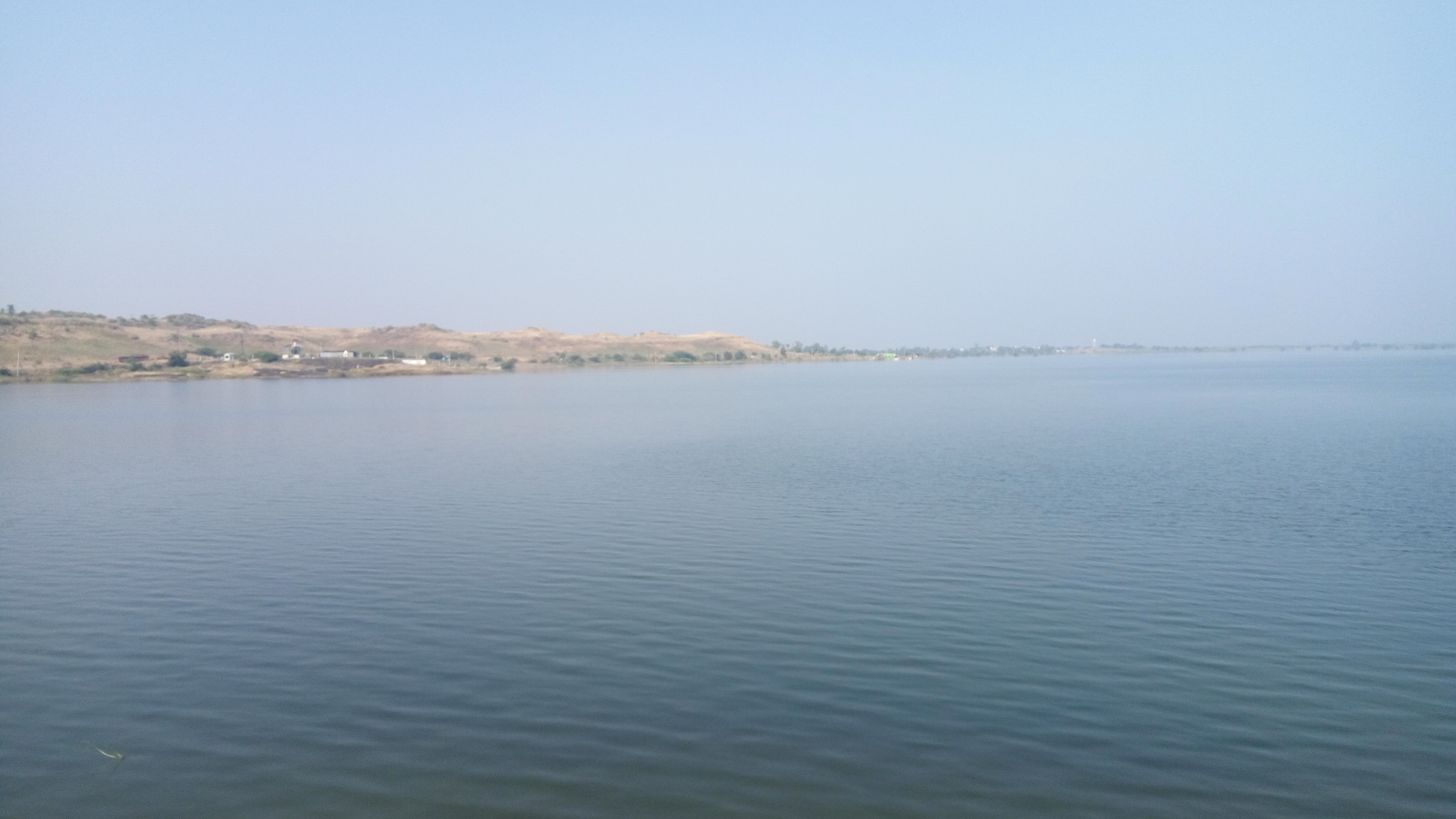
Veer Dam water
