= Kagna River =

Tributary of the Bhima River in India

Coordinates: 17°02′41″N 76°54′22″E

Kagina River is a tributary of the Bhima River, the main tributary of the Krishna River. It rises in the Ananthagiri hills near Vikarabad in the state of Telangana. Unlike other rivers of the Deccan that flow east or south east, the Kagna flows in a westernly direction through the states of Telangana and Karnataka before joining the Bhima near Wadi in Kalaburagi district.
