= Pimpalgaon Tarf Khed =

Village in Maharashtra

Pimpalgaon Tarf Khed Pimpalgaon, Shel Pimpalgaon
- village
- Location in Maharashtra, India Pimpalgaon Tarf Khed (India)
- Coordinates: 18°44′03″N 073°57′07″E
- Country: India
- State: Maharashtra
- District: Pune
- Taluka: Khed

Government
  - Body: Village panchayat

Population (2001)
  - Total: 5,957

Languages
  - Official: Marathi
- Time zone: UTC+5:30 (IST)
- Telephone code: 410501
- ISO 3166 code: IN-MH
- Vehicle registration: MH 14
- Website: pune.nic.in

Pimpalgaon Tarf Khed is a panchayat village in the state of Maharashtra, India, on the left (east) bank of the Bhima River. Administratively, Pimpalgaon Tarf Khed is under Khed Taluka of Pune District in Maharashtra. The village is 11 km east of the town of Chakan, and 23 km by road south of the town of Rajgurunagar (Khed).

There are four important places in the Pimpalgaon T. Khed gram panchayat: Pimpalgaon Tarf Khed, bhima-bhama river Sangam, shri Hanuman maharaj Mandir, Lokhandi Darwaja, Potale Mala, Mohitevadi, Dhashiwasti, Daundkarwadi, Ramnager

== Demographics ==
In the 2001 census, the village of Pimpalgaon Tarf Khed had 5,957 inhabitants, with 3,021 males (50.7%) and 2,936 females (49.3%), for a gender ratio of 972 females per thousand males.
