= Thokarwadi Dam =

Thokarwadi dam
- Location within Maharashtra
- Official name: Thokarwadi dam
- Location: Maval
- Coordinates: 18.9004358°N 73.535332°E
- Opening date: 1922
- Owners: Government of Maharashtra, India

Dam and spillways
- Type of dam: Gravity
- Impounds: Indrayani River
- Height: 59.44 m (195.0 ft)
- Length: 741 m (2,431 ft)
- Dam volume: 212 km^{3} (51 cu mi)
- Spillway type: OG
- Spillway capacity: 546 cumecs

Reservoir
- Creates: Thokarwadi
- Total capacity: 0.363 km^{3} (0.087 cu mi)
- Catchment area: 124.32 km^{2} (48.00 sq mi)
- Surface area: 24.3 km^{2} (9.4 sq mi)

Power Station
- Installed capacity: 72 MW

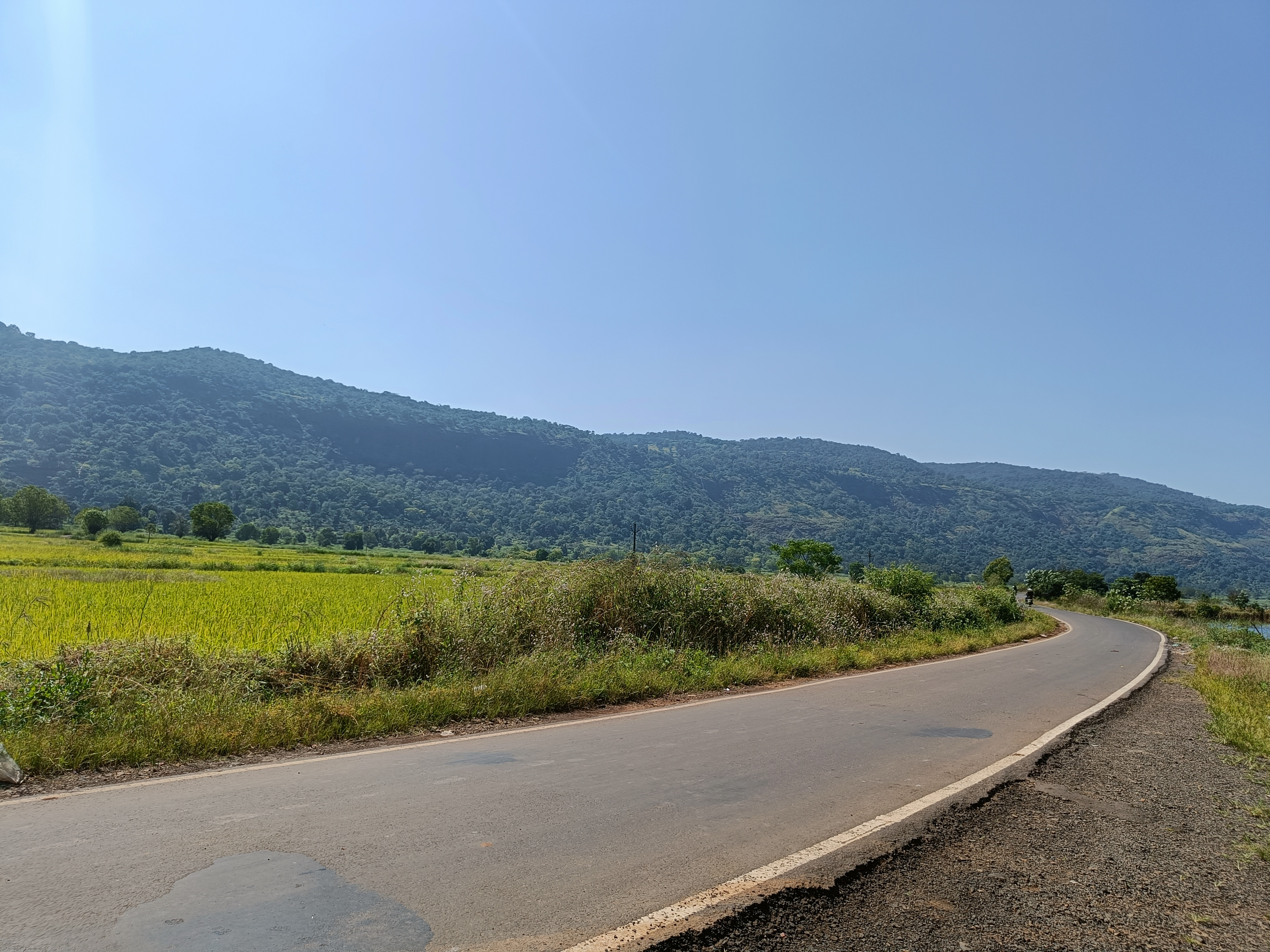
Visual picture of the dam

Thokarwadi dam is a gravity dam on the Andra river, which is a tributary to Indrayani River near Maval, Pune district in the state of Maharashtra in India. Krishna River basin water from this reservoir is diverted to the Bhivpuri power house to generate hydro electricity before letting in to a west flowing river which joins Arabian Sea

== Specifications ==
The height of the dam above the lowest foundation is 59.44 m (195.0 ft) while the length is 741 m (2,431 ft). The volume content is 212 km^{3} (51 cu mi) and gross storage capacity is 0.363 km^{3} (0.087 cu mi).

== Purpose ==
- Hydroelectricity

== See also ==
- Dams in Maharashtra
- List of reservoirs and dams in India
