= Parodi, Pune =

Village in Maharashtra

Parodi
- village
- Location in Maharashtra, India Parodi (India)
- Coordinates: 18°40′09″N 074°15′50″E
- Country: India
- State: Maharashtra
- District: Pune
- Taluka: Shirur

Population (2001)
  - Total: 1,114

Languages
  - Official: Marathi
- Time zone: UTC+5:30 (IST)
- Lok Sabha constituency: Shirur
- Vidhan Sabha constituency: Shirur

Parodi is a panchayat village in the state of Maharashtra, India, on the left (north) bank of the Bhima River. Administratively, Parodi is under Shirur Taluka of Pune District in Maharashtra. There is only the single village of Parodi in the Parodi gram panchayat. The village of Parodi is 12.5 km by road east of the village of Talegaon Dhamdhere, and 32 km by road southwest of the town of Shirur.

== Demographics ==
In the 2001 census, the village of Parodi had 1,114 inhabitants, with 569 males (51.1%) and 545 females (48.9%), for a gender ratio of 958 females per thousand males.
