= Niradevghar Dam =

- Location within Maharashtra
- Official name: Niradevghar Dam D03016
- Location: Bhor
- Coordinates: 18.1001736°N 73.721375°E
- Opening date: 2000
- Owners: Government of Maharashtra, India

Dam and spillways
- Type of dam: Earthfill
- Impounds: Niira river
- Height: 58.53 m (192.0 ft)
- Length: 2,430 m (7,970 ft)
- Dam volume: 99.38 km^{3} (23.84 cu mi)

Reservoir
- Total capacity: 332,130 km^{3} (79,680 cu mi)
- Surface area: 14,307 km^{2} (5,524 sq mi)

Niradevghar Dam, also written as Nira Deoghar is an earthfill dam on Niira river near Bhor, Pune district in the state of Maharashtra in India.

== Specifications ==
The height of the dam above lowest foundation is 58.53 m (192.0 ft) while the length is 2,430 m (7,970 ft). The volume content is 99,380 m^{3} (3,510,000 cu ft) and gross storage capacity is 337,390,000 m^{3} (1.1915×10^{10} cu ft).

== Purpose ==
- Irrigation

== See also ==
- Dams in Maharashtra
- List of reservoirs and dams in India
