= Shirvata Dam =

- Location within Maharashtra
- Official name: Shirvata Dam
- Location: Lonavala, Maval
- Coordinates: 18.8107637°N 73.4573978°E
- Opening date: 1920
- Owners: TATA POWER , India

Dam and spillways
- Type of dam: Gravity
- Height: 38.71 m (127.0 ft)
- Length: 2,212 m (7,257 ft)
- Dam volume: 460 km^{3} (110 cu mi)

Reservoir
- Total capacity: 185,110 km^{3} (44,410 cu mi)
- Surface area: 13.08 km^{2} (5.05 sq mi)

Shirvata Dam, is a gravity dam on Indrayani river near Maval, Pune district in State of Maharashtra in India.

== Specifications ==
The height of the dam above lowest foundation is 38.71 m (127.0 ft) while the length is 2,212 m (7,257 ft). The volume content is 460 km^{3} (110 cu mi) and gross storage capacity is 185,980.00 km^{3} (44,618.97 cu mi).

== Purpose ==
- Hydroelectricity

== See also ==
- Dams in Maharashtra
- List of reservoirs and dams in India
