= Santaji Jagnade =

Indian cymbal player, 1624–1688

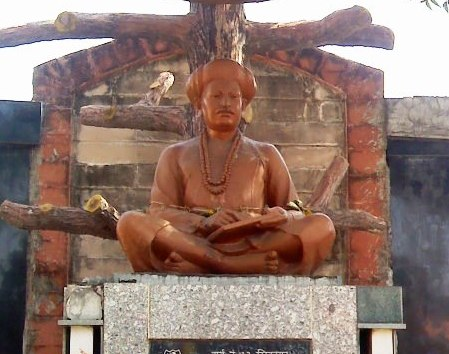
Statue of Santaji Jagnade Maharaj at Nagpur

Shri Santaji Jagnade Maharaj (8 December 1624–1688) was one of fourteen cymbal players employed by Shri Tukaram Maharaja, a prominent Marathi Sant. Jagnade wrote their own Abhangs and also recorded several of Tukaram's Abhangs, He belonged to the Teli caste of oil producers. Jagnade was born and brought up in Chakan in the khed tehsil in the Pune District. He was a Varkari, a devotee of Vittala (or Vithobā), an incarnation of Krishna, who in turn, is considered in Hinduism to be an incarnation of Vishnu. A stamp commemorating Jagnade was released in February 2009 by the Indian Postal Service.

A Santaji.postage stamp was published by Indian Post on 9 February 2009.
