= Bhimashankar Wildlife Sanctuary =

Wildlife sanctuary in India

- IUCN category IV (habitat/species management area)
- Location within Maharashtra Location within India
- Interactive map of Bhimashankar Wildlife Sanctuary
- Location: Maharashtra, India
- Nearest city: Pune
- Coordinates: 19.132°N 73.554°E
- Area: 131 km^{2} (51 mi^{2})
- Established: 1984

Bhimashankar Wildlife Sanctuary was created in the Ambegaon and Khed talukas of Pune District, in the Western Indian state of Maharashtra in order mainly to protect the habitat of the Indian Giant Squirrel.

It spreads through 3 districts of Maharashtra; Pune District, Raigad District and Thane District.

== Details ==
Bhimashankar Wildlife Sanctuary has an area of 131 km^{2} (51 mi^{2}) and is a part of the Western Ghats (Sahyadri Ranges), which itself is recognised as one of the 12 biodiversity hotspots of the world. The sanctuary was notified by the state government of Maharashtra in 1985 with the total area of is 130.78sq. km., under the Wildlife Protection Act 1972.

The sanctuary includes nine tribal villages. The area's bio-diversity has been retained as it will be preserved as a cluster of sacred groves for generations. These sacred groves act as gene pools of this area, from where seeds were dispersed. In Ahupe - a tribal (Mahadev Koli) village's sacred grove in the sanctuary, a climber Khombhal - Xantolis tomentosa was found to be 800–1000 years old in 1984.

=== Flora and Fauna ===
The sanctuary harbours large diversity of endemic & specialised flora and fauna. Sanctuary is home to the state animal of Maharashtra- Ratufa indica elphistonii, sub species of the Indian Giant squirrel that is one of three threatened Indo-Malyan squirrel species. The particular sub species found here is endemic to Bhimashankar. Important mammals reported from the sanctuary are carnivores like Leopard Panthera pardus, and Golden Jackal (Canis aureus), Sambar (Cervus unicolor), Barking Deer (Muntiacus muntjak), Wildboar (Sus scrofa), Common Langur (Semnopithecus entellus), Rhesus Macaque (Macaca mulatta) and the Mouse Deer (Moschiola meminna). The Indian Pangolin (Manis crassicaudata) is also reported. Sanctuary is rich in specialised and endemic reptiles, amphibians, butterflies and insects. During the monsoon (rainy season), various species of mosses and epiphytes including bioluminescent fungi can be seen on the trees.

== See also ==
- Bhimashankar
- Kanhargaon Wildlife Sanctuary
