= Walwan Dam =

- Location within Maharashtra
- Official name: Walwan Dam
- Location: Maval
- Coordinates: 18.771761°N 73.4271854°E
- Opening date: 1916
- Owners: Tata Power, India

Dam and spillways
- Type of dam: Gravity
- Impounds: Indrayani river
- Height: 26.36 m (86.5 ft)
- Length: 1,356 m (4,449 ft)
- Dam volume: 182,000 m^{3} (6,400,000 cu ft)

Reservoir
- Total capacity: 72,122,000 m^{3} (2.5470×10^{9} cu ft)
- Surface area: 142,500 m^{2} (1,534,000 sq ft)

Walwan Dam, (or Valvan Dam) is a gravity dam on the Indrayani river near Lonavala, Pune district in State of Maharashtra in India. It provides water to the nearby Khopoli Power Plant and to residents of Lonavala and Khandala and neighborhood villages.

== Specifications ==
The height of the dam above the lowest foundation is 26.36 m (86.5 ft) while the length is 1,356 m (4,449 ft). The volume content is 182,000 m^{3} (6,400,000 cu ft) and gross storage capacity is 72,500,000.00 m^{3} (2.560313337×10^{9} cu ft).

== Purpose ==
- Hydroelectricity

== See also ==
- Dams in Maharashtra
- List of reservoirs and dams in India
