= Bhama Asakhed Dam =

- Interactive map of Bhama Asakhed Dam
- Official name: Bhama Asakhed Dam D03019
- Location: Karanjvihire, Khed
- Opening date: 2000
- Owners: Government of Maharashtra, India

Dam and spillways
- Type of dam: Earthfill
- Impounds: Bhama river
- Height: 51 m (167 ft)
- Length: 1,425 m (4,675 ft)
- Dam volume: 6,183 km^{3} (1,483 cu mi)

Reservoir
- Total capacity: 217,100 km^{3} (52,100 cu mi)
- Surface area: 21,630 km^{2} (8,350 sq mi)

Bhama Asakhed Dam, is an earthfill dam on Bhama river near Khed, Pune district in state of Maharashtra in India.

== Specifications ==
The height of the dam above lowest foundation is 51 m (167 ft) while the length is 1,425 m (4,675 ft). The volume content is 6,183 km^{3} (1,483 cu mi) and gross storage capacity is 230,473.00 km^{3} (55,293.41 cu mi).

== Purpose ==
The dam's main purposes include irrigation and serving as a partial supply of water for Pune city.

== See also ==
- Dams in Maharashtra
- List of reservoirs and dams in India
