= Nira River =

Nira River नीरा नदी
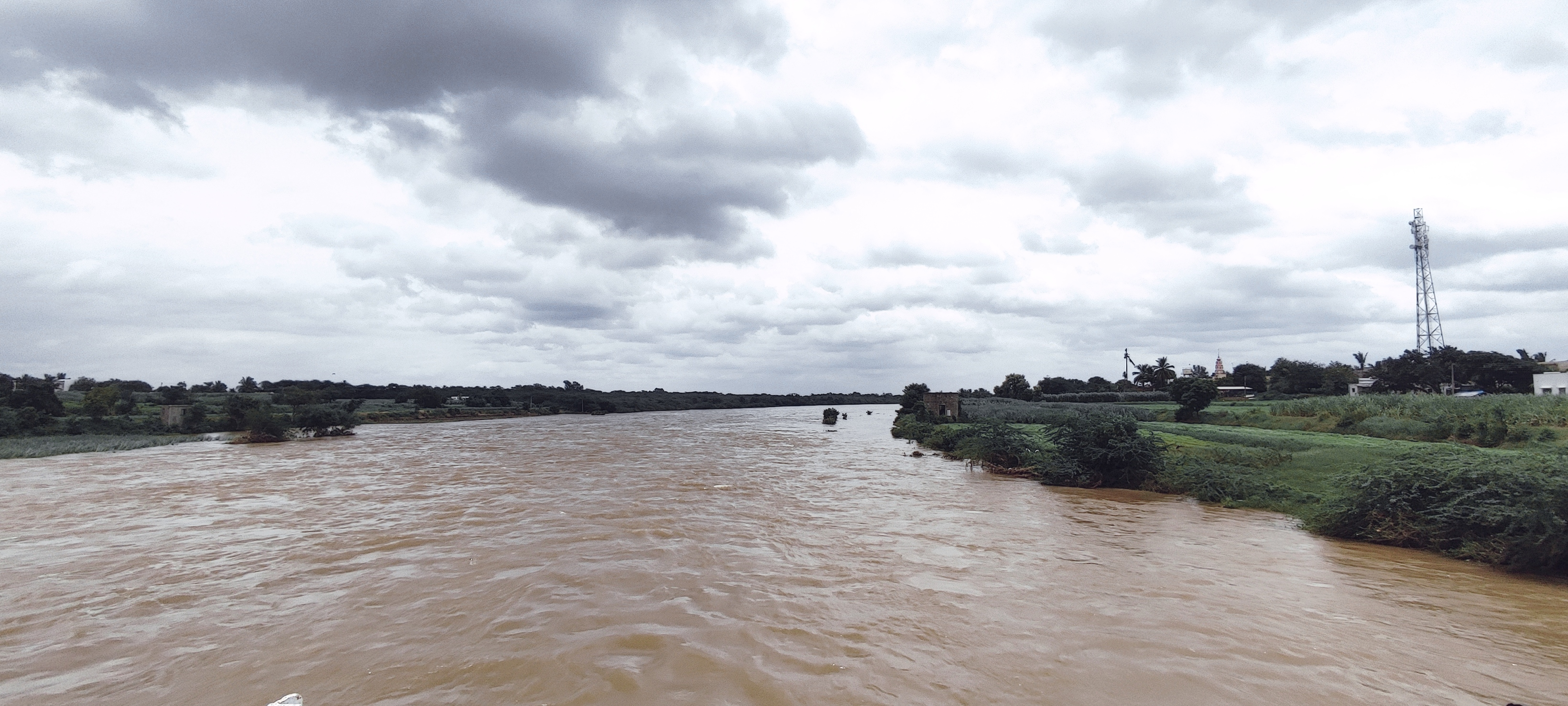
- neera river near phaltan

Location
- Country: India
- State: Maharashtra
- District: Pune, Satara, Solapur

Physical characteristics
- Source
  - location: Shirgaon ,Bhor
  - elevation: 750m
- Mouth: Bhima river
  - location: Nira narsingpur India
- Length: 209 km
- Discharge
  - location: mouth

Basin features
- River system: Krishna River
- Tributaries
  - left: Karha, Purnaganga, Velvandi, Gunjavani
  - right: Banganga, Khemwati

Nira is a river flowing through the Indian state of Maharashtra. It is a tributary of the Bhima river and flows through Pune and Solapur districts of Maharashtra. Karha is a tributary of Nira.

This river originates in western ghats in pune district and flows from Bhor taluka, Shirwal Taluka Satara District, Solapur District and then meets Bhima Basin at Nira Narsingpur near Akluj. It then flows with the Bhima water to Solapur District. The Nira river meets the Bhima between Nira Narsingpur in Pune District and Malshiras Taluka in Solapur district. The dams built on the Nira river are Devdhar dam and Veer dam in Satara and Pune District.
