= Kundali River =

River in western India

Kundali River is a river originating in the Kundali Hills of the Western Ghats in the state of Maharashtra, India and flowing into the Upper Bhima River Basin. It is a tributary of Indrayani River. From its origin to Shrwati dam, Kundali River waters are rated as A-1 class, and from Vadivale dam to its confluence with Indryani River its waters are rated as A-B class.

The Kundli Pumped Storage plan set forth a long-standing idea of Tata Power with the goal of implementing a fast-track plan of storing the water of the Kundli river in the Valwahan Dam at Lonavala during the monsoon season by constructing a dam at Shirwata, about 55 km. away, and then moving the water by gravity through a tunnel at Somwadi.
