= Indrayani River =

Coordinates: 18°40′N 74°00′E

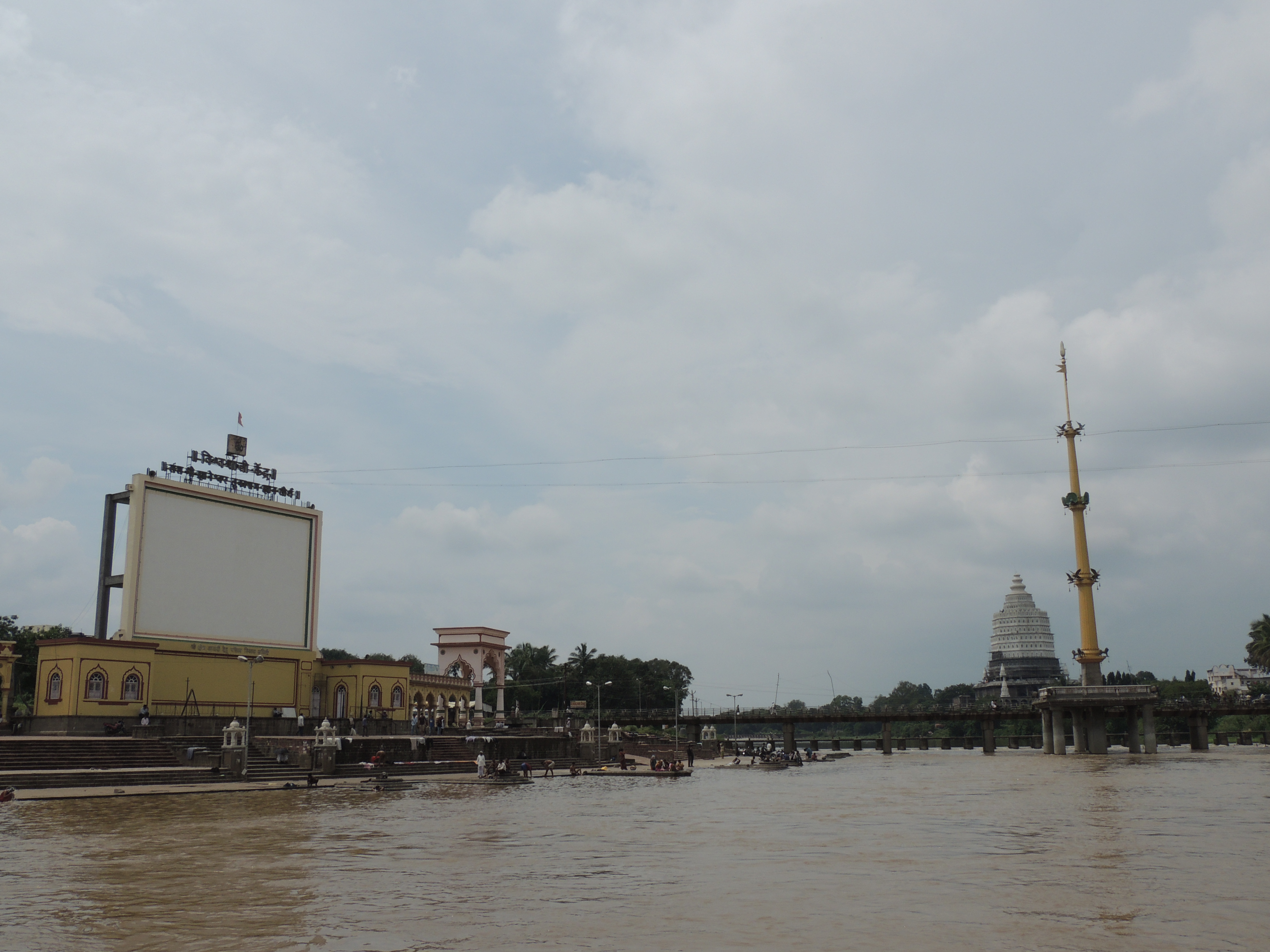
- Indrayani River at Alandi

Location
- Country: India
- State: Maharashtra

Physical characteristics
- Source
  - location: Lonavla, Pune, Maharashtra, India
- Mouth: Bhima River
  - location: Tulapur, Pune, Maharashtra, India
- Length: 104 km (65 mi)

Basin features
- Tributaries
  - left: Kundali River, Andra River

The Indrayani River originates in Kurvande village near Lonavala, a hill station in the Sahyadri mountains of Maharashtra, India. It is a rain-fed river and flows east through the Hindu pilgrimage centers of Dehu and Alandi to meet the Bhima river. It follows a course mostly north of the city of Pune. It is revered as a holy river by Hindus and is associated with Hindu religious figures such as Sant Tukaram and Dnyaneshwar.

There is a hydroelectric dam, the Valvan Dam, on the Indrayani at Lonavala.

== See also ==
- List of rivers of India
- Rivers of India
