= Khed taluka, Pune =

Khed taluka
- Tehsil
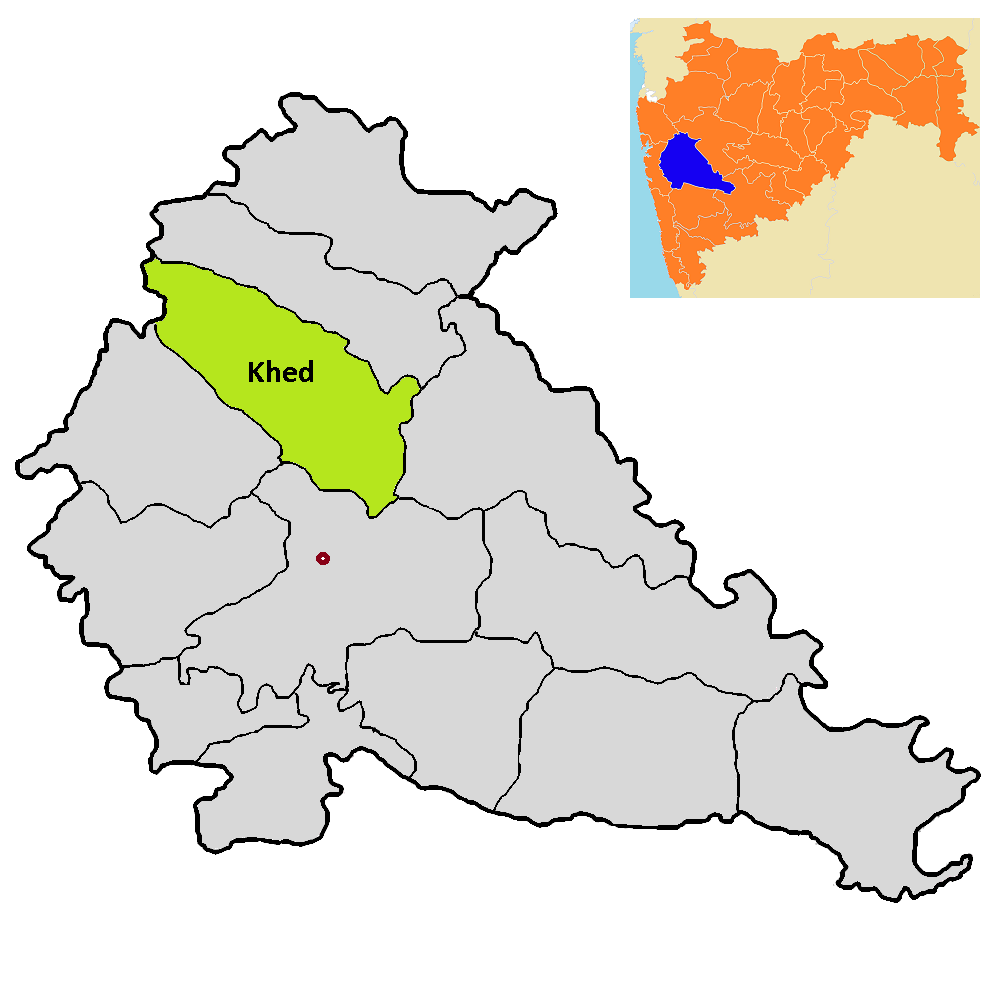
- Location of Khed in Pune district
- Country: India
- State: Maharashtra
- District: Pune
- Headquarters: Rajgurunagar
- Major villages: 98

Government
  - Tehsildar: 2
  - MLA: Babaji Kale

Population (2011)
  - Total: 450,116

Demographics
  - Literacy rate: 80.77%
  - Sex ratio: 892:1000

Khed taluka is a taluka in the subdivision, near Pune city in Pune district of the state of Maharashtra in India. Rajgurunagar is the headquarter of the taluka. The taluka is known for being the birthplace of Santaji Jagnade.The name of city is Rajgurunagar on the name of Shivram Hari Rajguru.

== Demographics ==
Religions in Khed taluk (2011)
Religion	Percent
Hinduism	93.17%
Buddhism	3.27%
Islam	2.60%
Jainism	0.57%
Other or not stated	0.39%

Khed taluka has a population of 450,116 according to the 2011 census. Khed had a literacy rate of 80.77% and a sex ratio of 892 females per 1000 males. 56,102 (12.46%) are under 7 years of age. 129,334 (28.73%) lived in urban areas. Scheduled Castes and Scheduled Tribes make up 6.76% and 10.95% of the population respectively.

Languages of Khed taluk (2011)
1. Marathi (92.0%)
2. Hindi (4.62%)
3. Others (3.39%)

At the time of the 2011 Census of India, 91.99% of the population in the taluka spoke Marathi and 4.62% Hindi as their first language.

In the 2001 India census, Khed taluka had a population of 343,214, with 178,114 males (51.9%), and 165,100 females (48.1%), for a sex-ratio of 927 females per thousand males.

== See also ==
- Amboli, Pune
- Talukas in Pune district
- Rajgurunagar
- Bhimashankar Temple
