= Chas, Maharashtra =

Chas
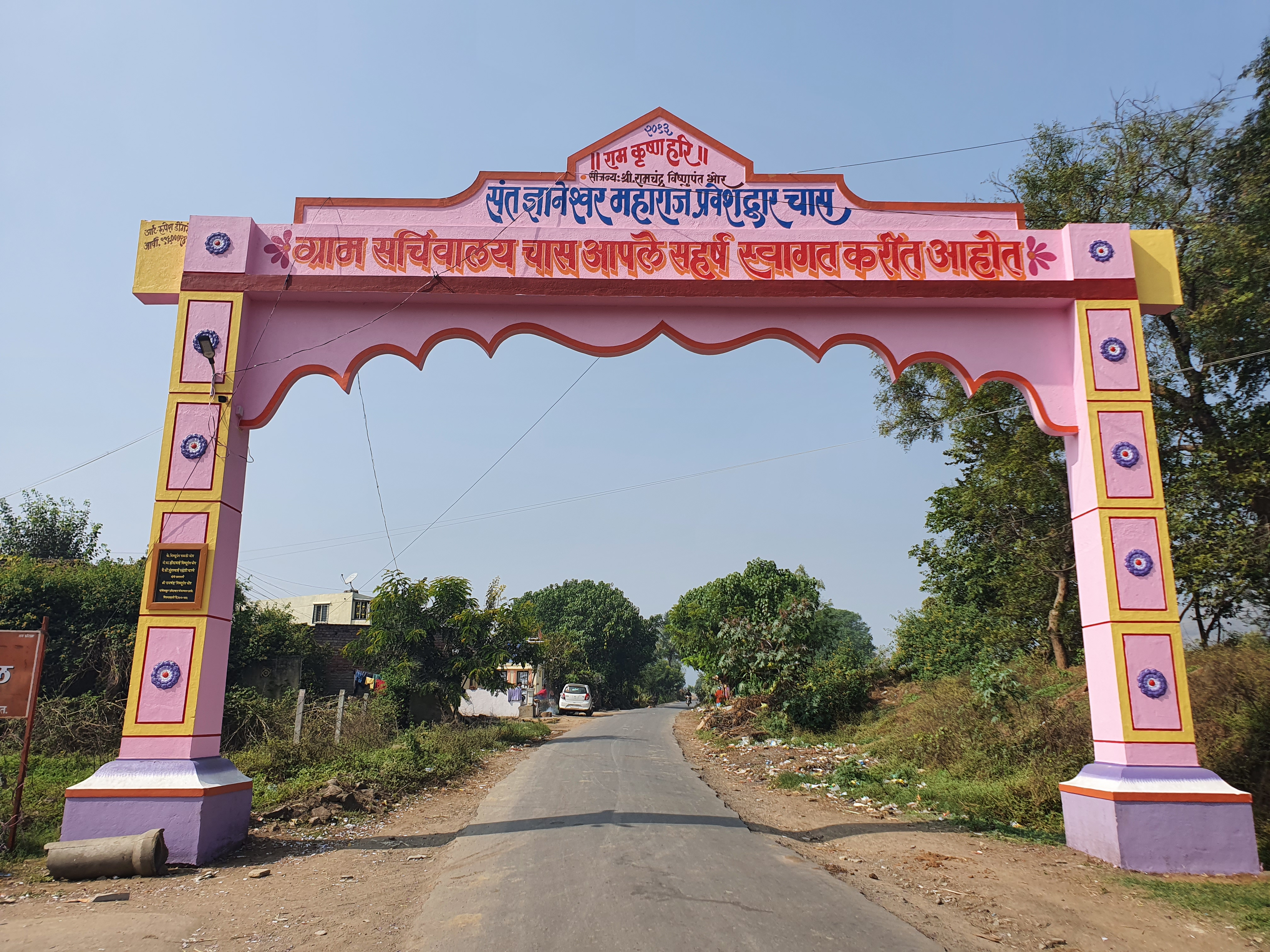
- The entrance arch built by Ramchandra Vishnupant Bhor
- Nicknames: Chas Mauli, Chas Narodi, Chas Ambegaon
- Location in Maharashtra, India
- Coordinates: 19.052342°N 73.881426°E
- Country: India
- State: Maharashtra
- District: Pune
- Taluka: Ambegaon

Population
  - Total: 2,300

Languages
  - Official: Marathi
- Time zone: UTC+5:30 (IST)
- PIN: 410515
- Telephone code: 02133
- Vehicle registration: MH 14
- Nearest city: Manchar Ghodegaon
- Lok Sabha constituency: Shirur (Lok Sabha constituency)
- Vidhan Sabha constituency: Ambegaon

Chas is a small town on the banks of the river Ghod River in Ambegaon taluka of Pune district in the Indian state of Maharashtra, India.

== Geography ==
Chas is located at 19.052342°N 73.881426°E and falls under Ambegaon Taluka. It is situated 6 km from the sub-district headquarters, Ghodegaon, and 82 km from Pune. The village is located at the foothills of the Sahyadri Mountain range, to the north of Pune city.

The female population is 49.5%. The village has a literacy rate of 74.0%, with a female literacy rate of 33.5%.

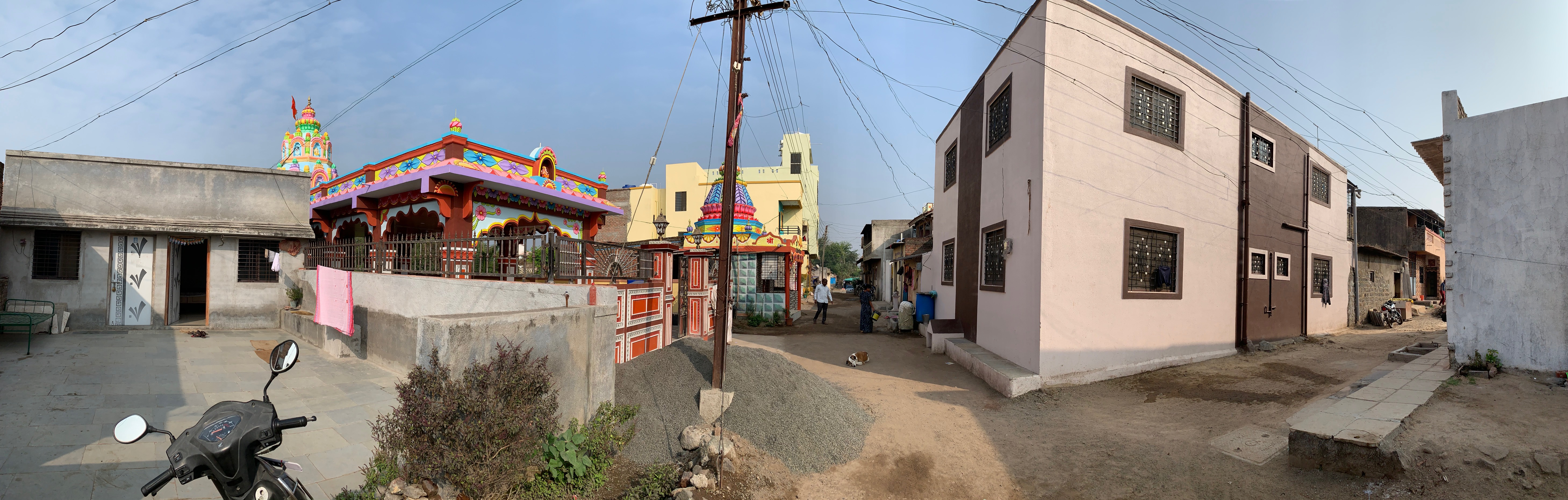

The total geographical area of the village is 360.05 hectares. Chas has a population of approximately 2,300 people and consists of about 504 houses. The village covers areas including Kadewadi, Ganeshwadi, Thakarwadi, Jambhalemala, and Chas itself.

The nearest Police station is Ghodegaon Police Station.

== History of Chas ==
This village is blessed by the presence of Saint Dnyaneshwar Maharaj. Sri Sant Dnyaneshwar Maharaj had recited the Vedas from a Reda (sacred book) named Gyana. Sant Dnyaneshwar Maharaj, Nivrittinath, Sopan, and Muktai, four siblings, took that Reda to Alandi.

Dnyaneshwar Maharaj at Chas	Chas History

On their way, the Gyana Reda passed away while they were coming to Ale in Junnar Taluka. The four siblings were deeply saddened by this loss, and they performed the last rites for Reda in Ale. Later, while traveling to Bhimashankar, they reached the place of Chas. Mauli decided that Redya's Dasakriya ritual should be performed at the Dakshina Vahini river basin. Upon reaching Chas, they saw the southward flow of the river.

The Ghod river flows eastward at this place, and the area faces naturally south. It was here that Mauli performed the Dashakriya of Redya.

A unique feature of this river is that the Ghodnadi flows from east to south. According to spiritual science, the flow of the Dakshina Vahini river is considered sacred, and bathing in its waters is considered as holy as bathing at the Kumbh Mela.

Mauli established this location for the Dasakriya ritual and performed Redya's final rites according to the scriptural rituals.

The 12th Century

In the 12th century, the villagers built a stone mausoleum on a square stone platform at this location. This samadhi, which later became known as Mhasoba, the village deity, is the same Mhasoba from whose mouth Mauli had recited the Vedas. Every year, the Mhasoba Yatra Utsav is celebrated with great enthusiasm, from the full moon of Chaitra Shuddha 7 to Chaitra Shuddha 13.

The sanctity of this place is mentioned in many religious texts. This pilgrimage site is famously known as Navsala Pavana Mhasoba. Thousands of devotees have experienced its blessings. Many pilgrims visiting Bhimashankar, Lenyadri, and Ozar feel that their journey is incomplete without a visit to this place. The greatness of this place has been unique since the 12th century.

1959-1960

During this period, Vaikuntha resident H.B.P. Guruvarya Kondaji visited this place to perform kirtan service and explained to the villagers the sacred importance of the site. He encouraged them to build a temple in honor of Saint Dnyaneshwar Maharaj.

Following the request of Dere Baba, a beautiful marble idol of Mauli was created, and a temple shaped like a fish was erected. A nearby temple dedicated to Mukta Devi was also built.

Mauli Temple Old Photo	ज्ञानेश्वर मंदिराची जुनी बांधणी - १	ज्ञानेश्वर मंदिराची जुनी बांधणी - २	ज्ञानेश्वर मंदिराचा जुना फोटो
ज्ञानेश्वर मंदिर - समोरचा देखावा

Later, the villagers decided to restore the temple and held a meeting at the Maruti temple. The Bhoomi Poojan (ground-breaking ceremony) for the new temple was performed with the auspicious hands of Sakhre Maharaj of Alandi. Today, a beautiful temple stands in this sacred place.

Since the 12th century, this site has been considered very sacred by devotees. Bathing in the river here is considered as holy as bathing at the Kumbh Mela.

== Agricultural ==
Agriculture is the main occupation of the village. The most commonly grown crop is bajra, along with vegetables such as potatoes, tomatoes, and onions. Farmers also cultivate fruits like grapes and bananas.

The Ghod River flows through the village, providing a vital water supply for local farmers. The village is also connected to the Dimbhe Dam water canal. Chas has a reliable water supply from the Dimbhe Dam Canal, Ghod River, and monsoon rains, enabling farmers to cultivate crops throughout the year.

Khandi Chas	Mahadya Dongar at Chas	General view of Chas	Chas Bandhara	Chas Village

During the Monsoon 2019, the famous Dnyaneshwar temple was under water. Due to heavy monsoon rains, the Dimbhe Dam released 22,000 cusecs of water into the Ghod River on August 29, 2022.

Chas Temple	View of Chas

== Education at Chas ==
Chas has a primary school that offers education up to the 4th standard, and Sant Dnyaneshwar Vidyalaya provides education up to the 10th standard. The primary school was established in 1855.

Sant Dnyaneshwar Vidyalaya was founded on June 13, 1977. Mr. Shinde Guruji was the first principal of the school, and Mr. Aaayub Inamdar and Mr. Sambhaji Barve were the first teachers.

After completing their SSC, students typically choose a college in either Ghodegaon or Manchar for higher studies. For many years, the SSC passing percentage at Sant Dnyaneshwar Vidyalaya has been 100%.

The total campus area of the school is ten and a half acres, which includes the building, a playground, and a tamarind orchard. Various activities are conducted in the school, including an open gym, IBT, library, ICT, and many other programs.

Around 450 students study at the school. Students come from villages such as Sakore, Amondi, Girwali, Narodi, and others to receive their education.

Sant Dnyaneshwar Vidyalaya	Primary school at Chas	Sending-off ceremony - 29 Aug 2021

== Festivals and Temples in Chas ==
Events like the local Yatra, Wrestling, Tamasha, and various religious observances, including Ganesh Chaturthi, are celebrated with great enthusiasm in Chas. The village is home to many temples that attract devotees from all over the state.

New Ram Temple	Sant Dnyaneshwar Maharaj	Ancient murti	Shani Maharaj	Nandi sculpture next to Shankar Temple	Shankar Murti	Pirache Mandir

Bullock cart races are an integral part of life in Chas and are widely recognized throughout Pune district. Here is a photo from the 2011 race in Chas.

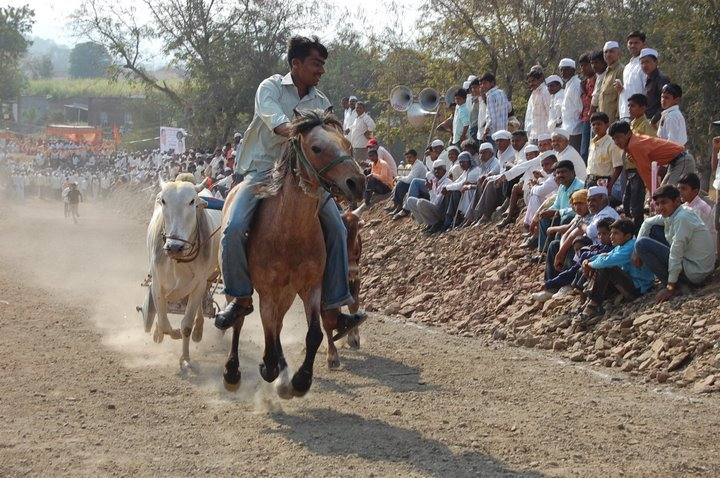
Bullock Cart Race

The villagers of Chas have constructed a new Ram Mandir to replace the old temple, which was 100 years old. The newly constructed Hindu Ram temple in Chas was opened to devotees on Saturday, March 25, 2023, in a grand ceremony.

Ram Mandir at Chas	View of Chas	Mandir under construction	Ram Temple June 2021
Chas temple front	Ram Mandir September 2022	Chas temple view	Another view of Ram Temple
Ram Temple Yatra	Ram Temple Mirvanook	Chas Kirtan Group	Chas Kirtan Group 2

== 750th Birth Anniversary Celebrations of Sant Dnyaneshwar (2025) ==
Event: 750th Birth Anniversary (Saptashatkotar Suvarna Mahotsav) of Shri Sant Dnyaneshwar Maharaj

The 750th Birth Anniversary Celebrations of Sant Dnyaneshwar are planned to be held in Chas, on the banks of the Ghodnadi river, from 24 October 2025 to 31 October 2025.

Purpose: Celebration of Sant Dnyaneshwar Maharaj’s life, teachings, and spiritual guidance, with religious discourses, devotional singing, rituals, and community participation. The festival is a major spiritual and cultural event designed to promote devotion, community involvement, and the teachings of Sant Dnyaneshwar Maharaj.

The event will include spiritual discourses, kirtans, and cultural programs, with participation from devotees and scholars from across the region.

Dnyaneshwar Maharaj at Chas	Agenda for 7 days Saptah	Chas Temple during 750th Birth Anniversary celebrations	Celebrations on the 750th Birth Anniversary	Kirtan on the 750th Birth Anniversary celebrations at the temple hall	Denagi cheque Accepted by Sachin Bhor

== Senior citizen ==
Chas has a senior citizen group, led by President Mr. Inamdar, a recipient of the National Teachers Award presented by the President of India. This group focuses on catering to the needs and interests of older adults and helps drive village-focused benefit schemes.

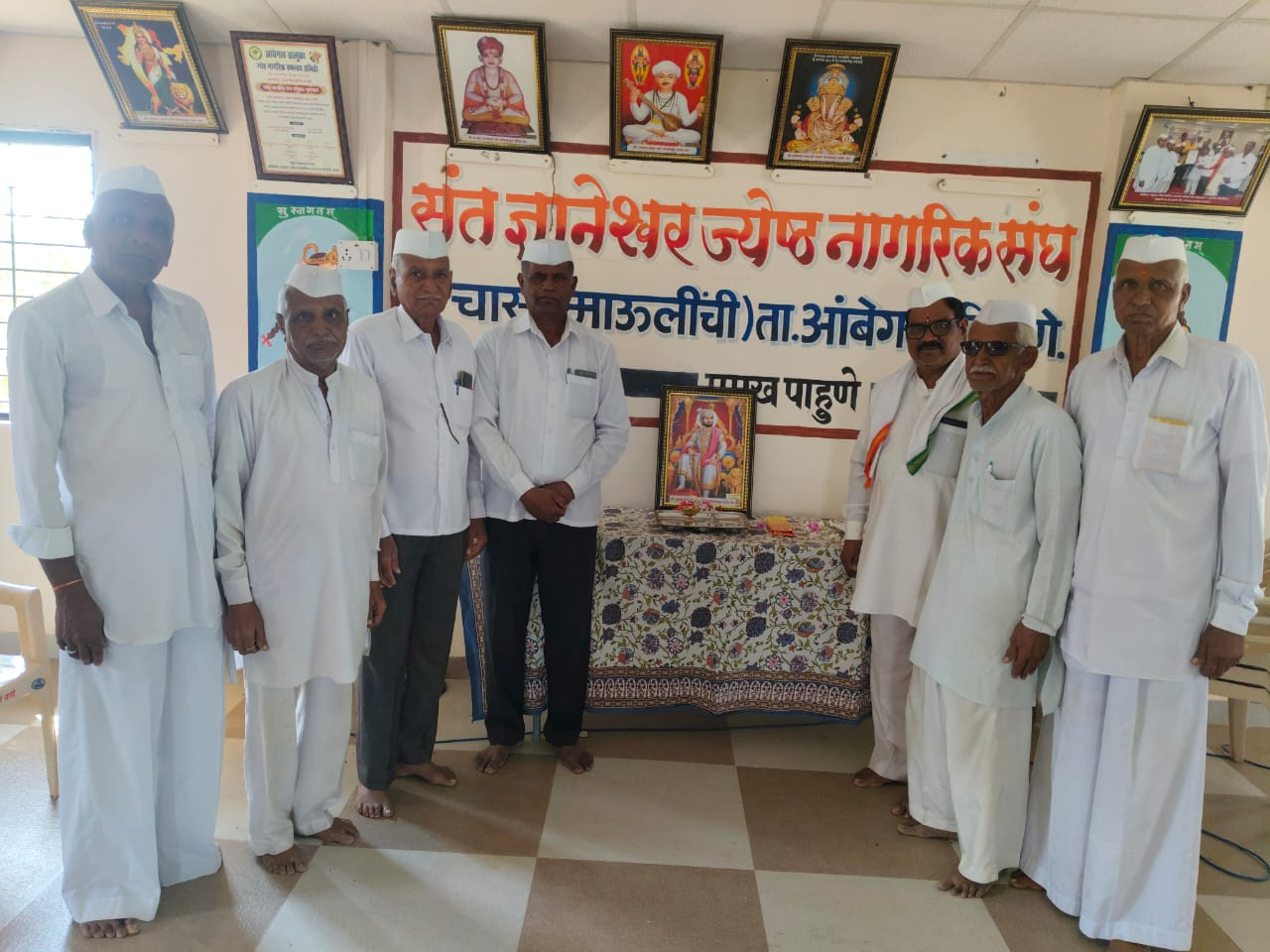
Senior Citizens of Chas during community event

== Tourism ==
Tourist sites include the Saint Dnyaneshwar Maharaj temple. At Chas, on the bank of Ghod River, Dashkriya Vidhi (10th ritual after death) of Dnyanoba Mauli's buffalo (reda) took place. The buffalo is said to have died in Ale village and his tomb was constructed on the bank of Chas.

Many rock pools can be seen in the river, and numerous formations of queues are present. This nature-rich village attracts both tourists and devotees.

Recently, the state government has included Chas village in a list of Grade C pilgrimage places.

Dnyaneshwar Main Temple	Kirtan Palakhi celebration	Another view of Dnyaneshwar Temple	Sacred Kund at Chas	Dnyaneshwar Temple front view	Dashkriya Vidhi at Pravesh Dwar	Chas's Ves cultural event

The film industry has also been captivated by these scenic locations. Many Marathi and Hindi film serials have been filmed here

Shooting of films like Pak Pak Pakaak (2005) - पक पक पकाक and Gauracha Navra (1988) have been shot here.

== Leopard attacks in Chas ==
Leopard population around Chas village has grown over the last 10 years. Recently, the frequency of leopard attacks has increased, resulting in 5 people suffering minor to major injuries between 2019 and early 2020. It has been observed that these leopards have adapted to changing land patterns and now prefer to live near human habitats for survival.

The local administration has proposed a leopard safari project in Ambegaon, Junnar Taluka. This initiative is expected to attract wildlife enthusiasts and promote eco-tourism in the region.

== Administration and Politics ==
The village is administered by a Sarpanch, who is an elected representative as per the Constitution of India and the Panchayati Raj. Mrs. Archana Daulat Barve is the Sarpanch of Chas-Mauli, while Aashatai Khandu Parghi serves as the Sarpanch of Thakarwadi - Chas.

Dilip Walse-Patil of Nationalist Congress Party is the current MLA and Ex-Cabinet Minister, served as Ministry of Co-operation as the Minister in Government of Maharashtra from Ambegaon Vidhan Sabha constituency. Dr. Amol Kolhe of Nationalist Congress Party is the current member of parliament (MP) from Shirur (Lok Sabha constituency)

Mr. Sachin Bhor Patil of Nationalist Congress Party is a youth leader for Shirur (Lok Sabha constituency).

Shri. Balasaheb G. Shekhar, a retired IPS officer, is a resident of Chas. Previously, Mr. Shekhar served as DIG, Nashik and Additional Commissioner of Police (Crime) in Navi Mumbai.

His daughter, Janhavi Shekhar Patil, is currently serving as an Indian Police Service (IPS) officer. She completed her schooling in Nashik before pursuing a degree in civil engineering from Pune.

Deputy Commissioner (Education), Mrs. Vasundhara Barve, and Deputy Commissioner (General Administration) are residents of Chas.

In February 2026, Mrs. Preeti Pravin Thorat won the Pune Zilla Parishad polls, which were held after a nine-year interval. She is the new member from Kalabh Chandoli.

Earlier, Tulsi Sachin Bhor of Nationalist Congress Party was the local representative of Kalamb - Chandoli BK (Zilha Parishad Pune).

== COVID-19 Pandemic in Chas ==
Many local migrants who had traveled from bustling cities like Pune, Mumbai, and other parts of India returned to their hometowns to avoid the spread of COVID-19.

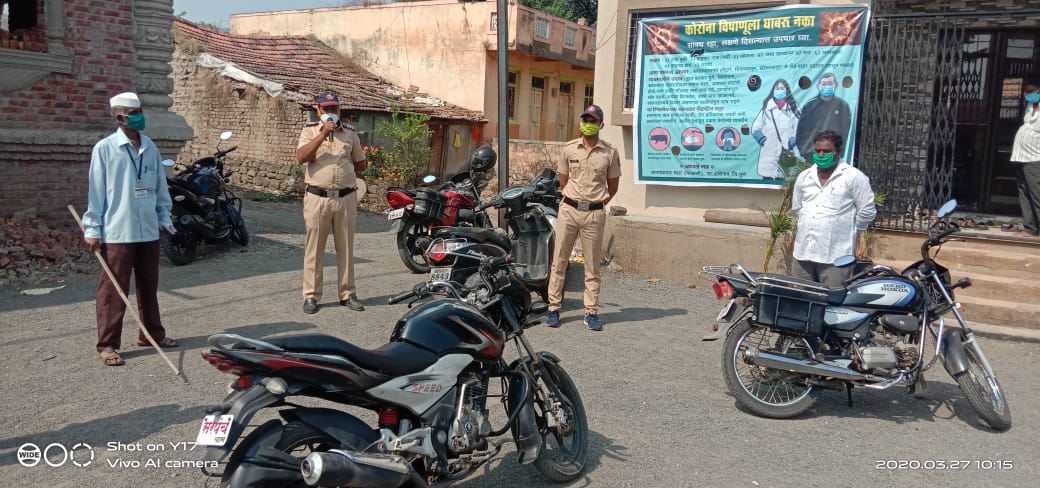
Chas during the Corona period

In accordance with the Government of Maharashtra’s COVID-19 regulations, they were promptly quarantined at Sant Dnyaneshwar Vidyalaya to ensure their safety and that of the local community.

The state government mandated strict quarantine and health monitoring for returnees, along with contact tracing and preventive measures, to curb community transmission.

A strict and comprehensive lockdown was subsequently imposed in Chas, following the detailed directives issued by the Government of Maharashtra, in an effort to contain the spread of infection and maintain public health.

== Transportation ==
Chas is well connected by both public and private transport to Ghodegaon, Manchar, and Kalamb.

The village is located just 9 km (5.6 mi) east of the Pune-Nashik National Highway 60 (India).

A proposed rail link between Pune and Nashik is expected to enhance future connectivity. The nearest international and domestic airport is Pune Airport at Lohegaon.

== Nearby Attractions ==
- Bhimashankar Temple,
- Bhimashankar Wildlife Sanctuary,
- Vigneshwara Temple, Ozar,
- Lenyadri,
- Girawali Observatory,
- Shivneri,
- Giant Metrewave Radio Telescope Khodad,
- Narayangad,
