= Pabal =

Village in Maharashtra

- Village
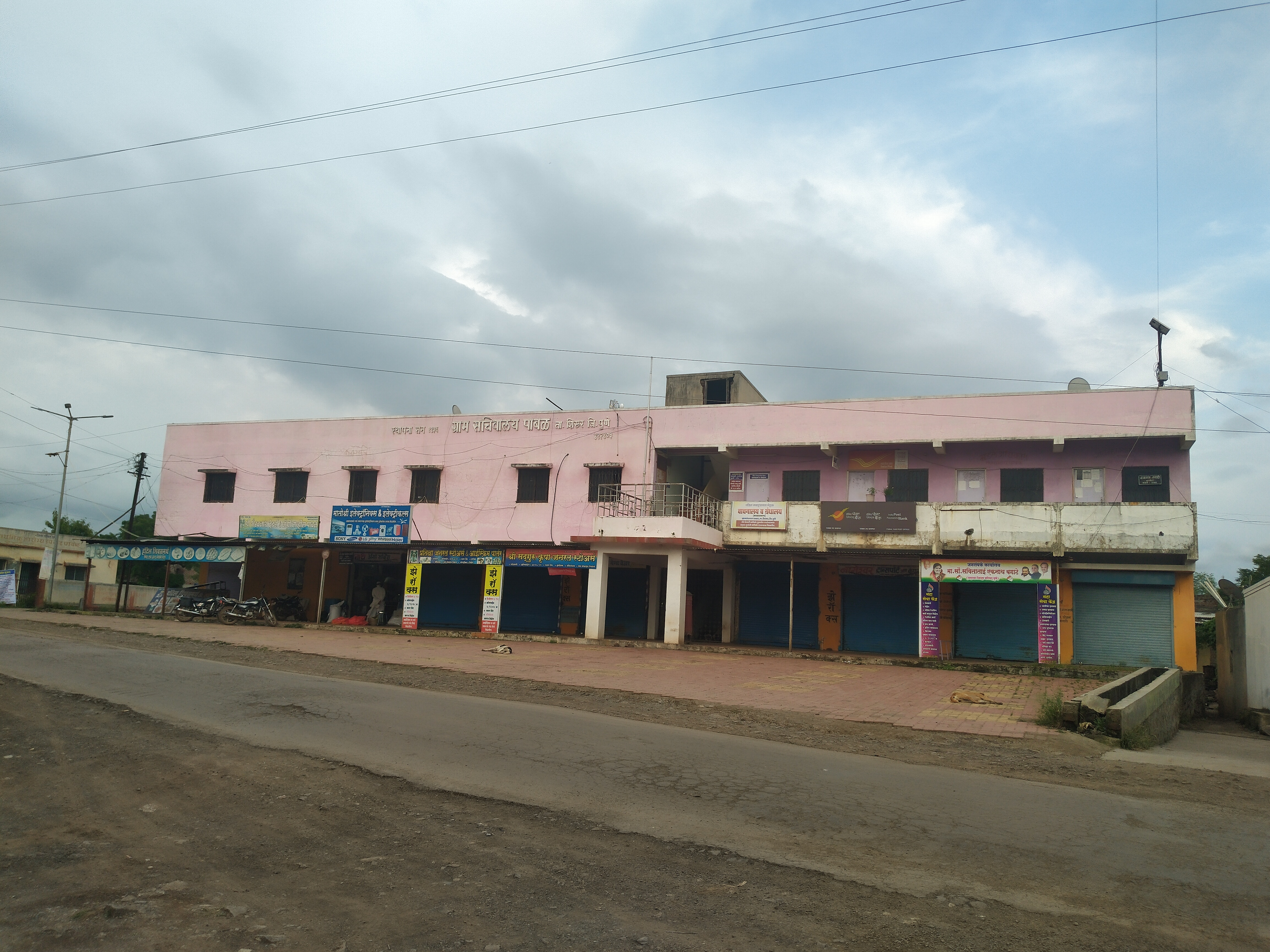
- Graph Panchayat building, Pabal

- Location in Maharashtra, India Pabal (India)
- Coordinates: 18°49′51″N 074°03′10″E
- Country: India
- State: Maharashtra
- District: Pune
- Taluka: Shirur

Languages
  - Official: Marathi
- Time zone: UTC+5:30 (IST)
- PIN: 412403
- Telephone code: 022488
- Vehicle registration: MH-12, MH-14
- Lok Sabha constituency: Shirur
- Vidhan Sabha constituency: Ambegaon

Pabal, is a panchayat village in Shirur Taluka in Pune district of state of Maharashtra, India. It is located in the northwest corner of the taluka, bordering on Ambegaon Taluka to the north and Khed Taluka to the west. It lies on the left (north) bank of the Welu River. Pabal is 39.34 km far from the district's main city of Pune.

Nearby villages of Pabal with distance are Pur (3.792 km), Pur (3.792 km), Kanhersar (4.552 km), Kendur (5.564 km), Dhamari (6.302 km), Wadgaon Pir (6.617 km), Gosasi (7.471 km), Kanhur Mesai, Morachi Chincholi Shirur, Saradwadi, Shindodi, Shirasgaon Kata, Sonesangavi, Takali Bhima, Takali Haji, Talegaon Dhamdhere, Tardobachiwadi, Uralgaon, Vitthalwadi, Shikrapur (20 km). This is also the burial place of Mastani.

== Education ==
- Shri Bhairavnath Vidya Mandir, Pabal
- Vigyan Ashram
- Padmamani Jain Mahavidyalaya, Pabal.

== Gallery ==
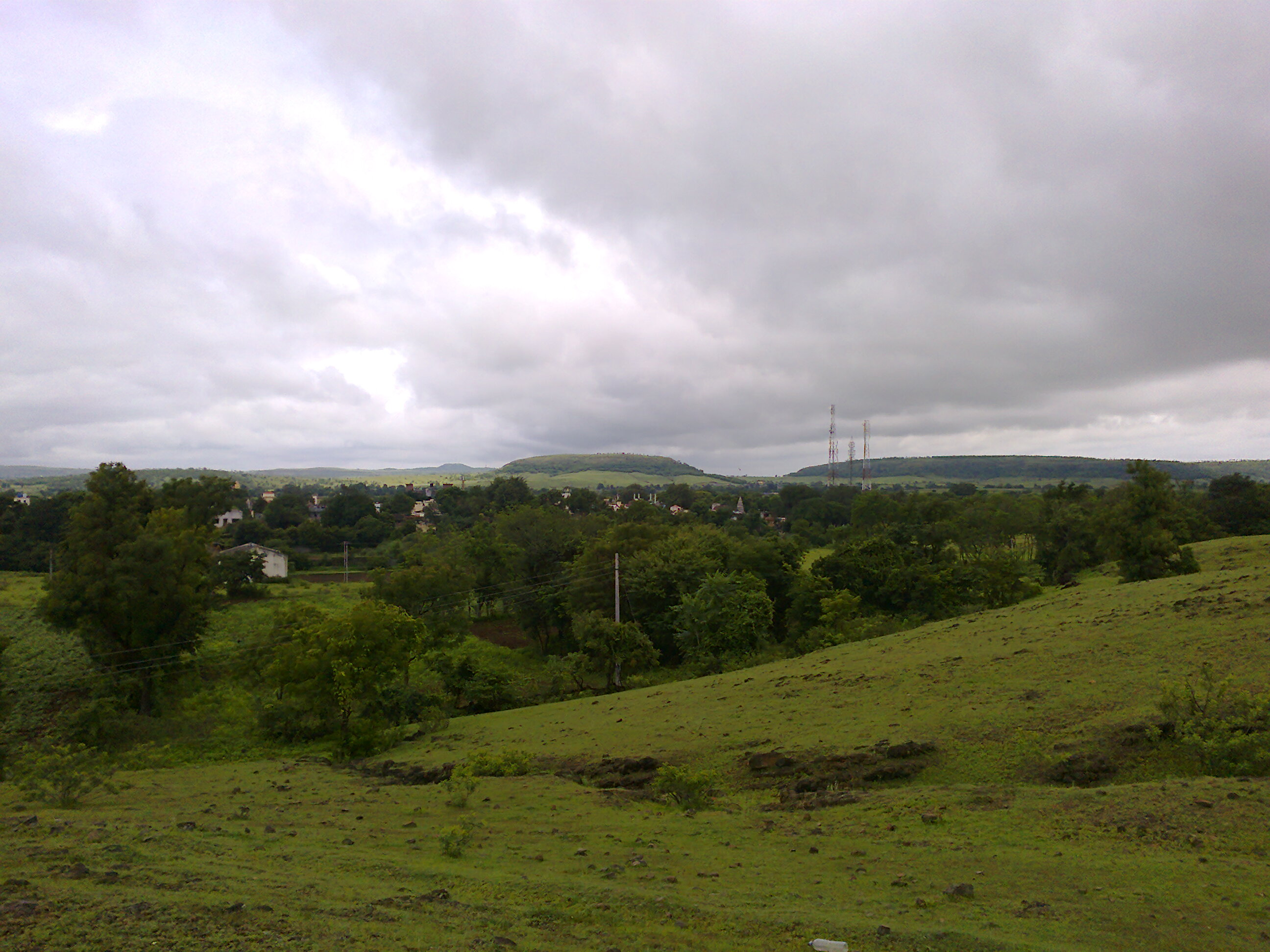
Pabal view

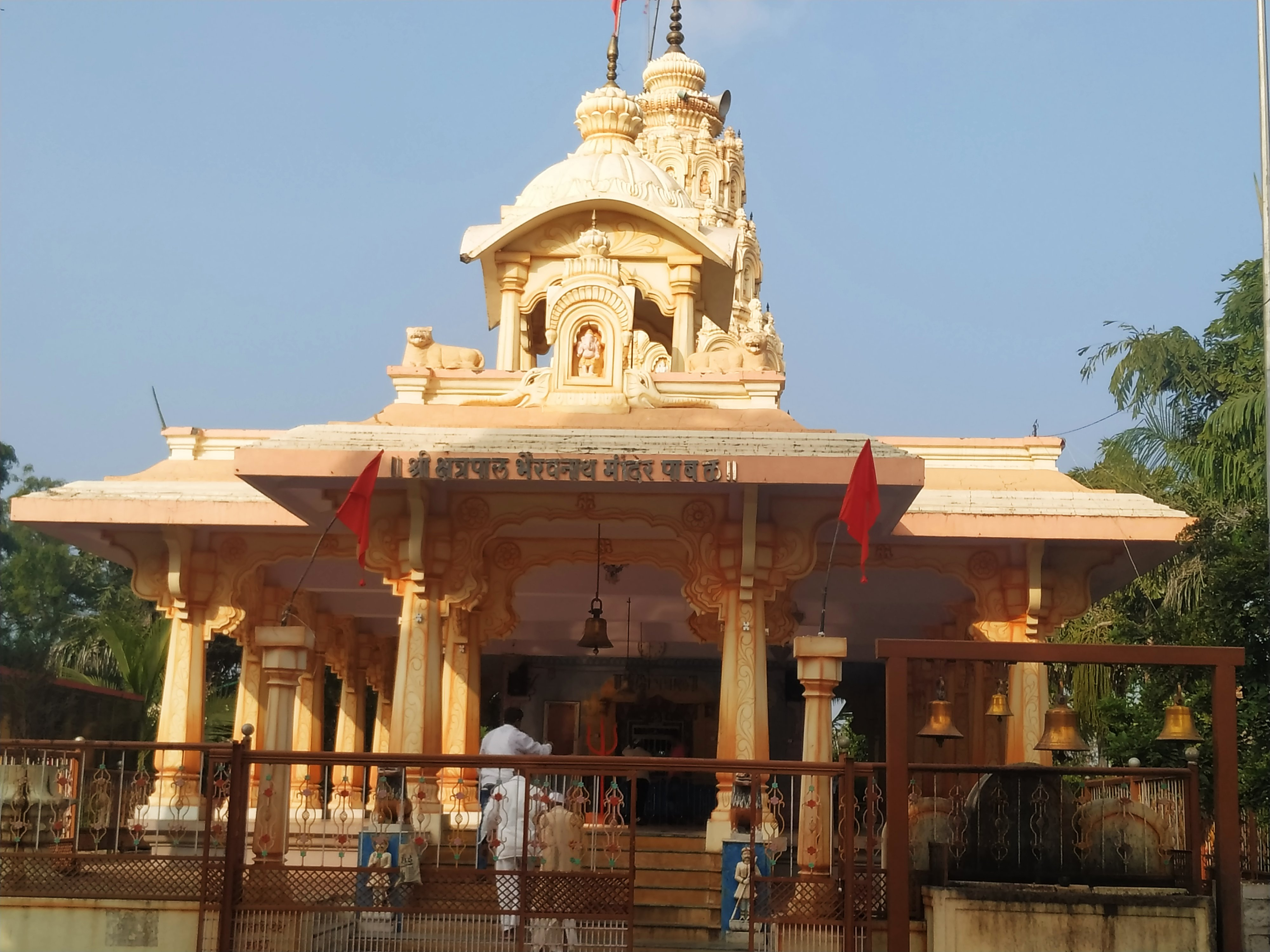
Bhairavnath Temple front view

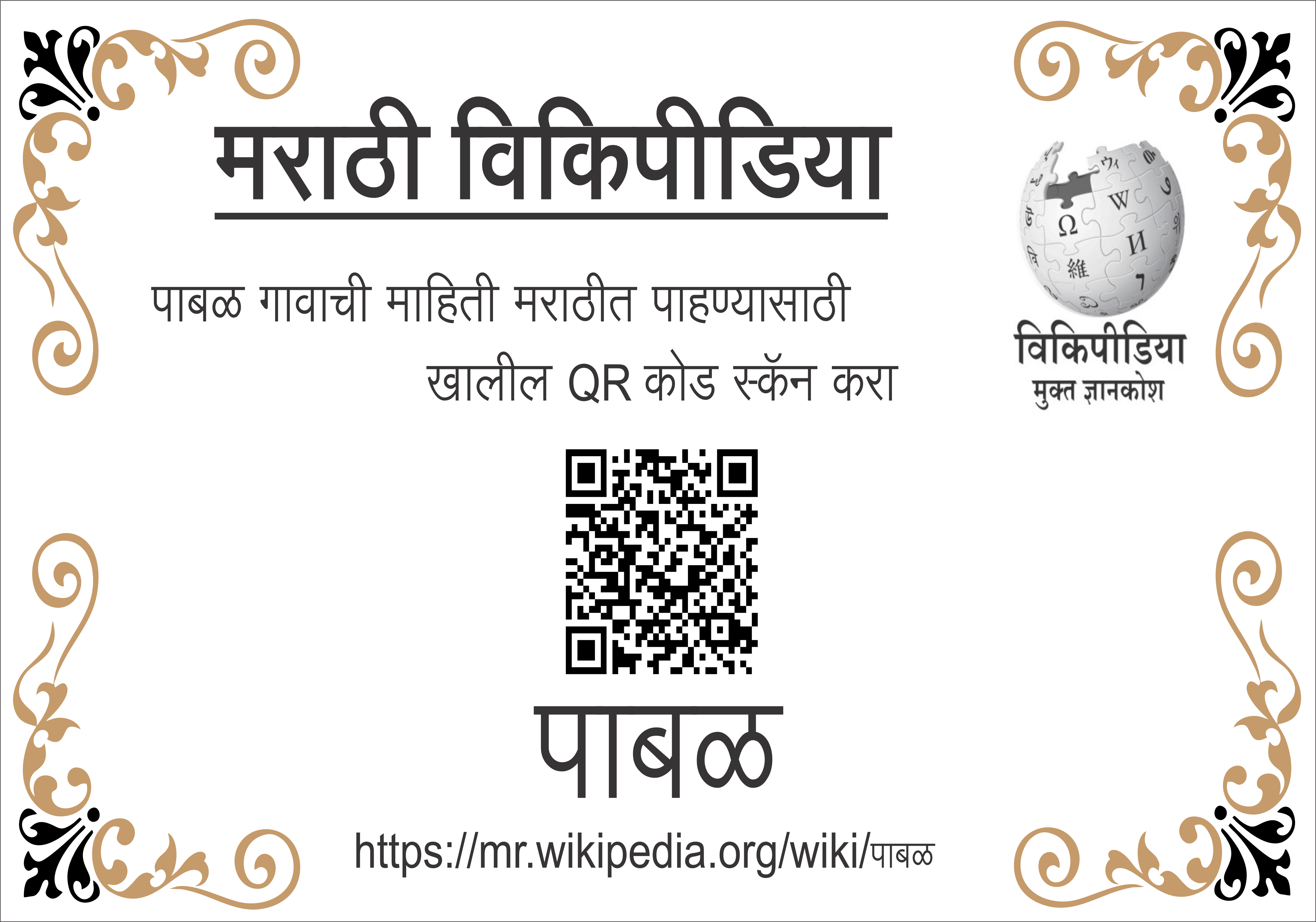
QR code for Pabal

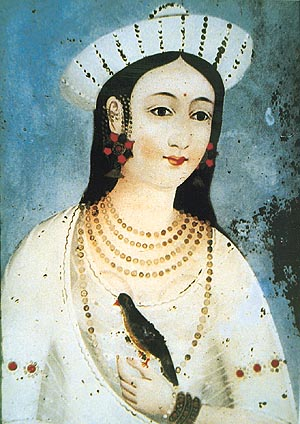
Mastani 28tt13

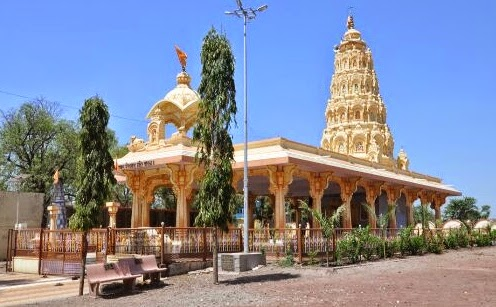
Bhairavanath mandir

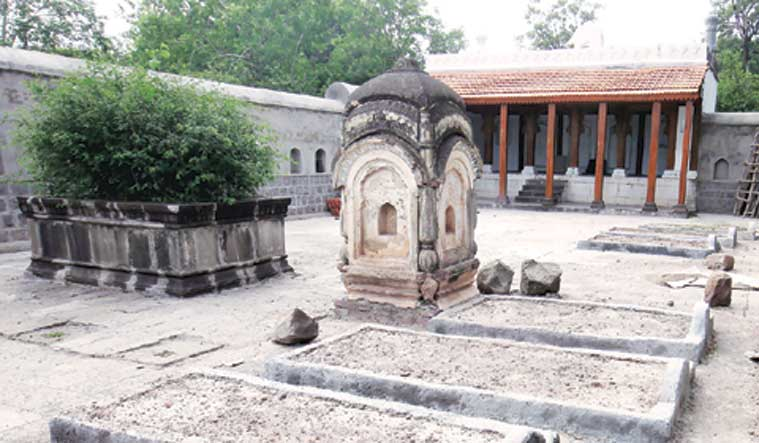
Mastani-759

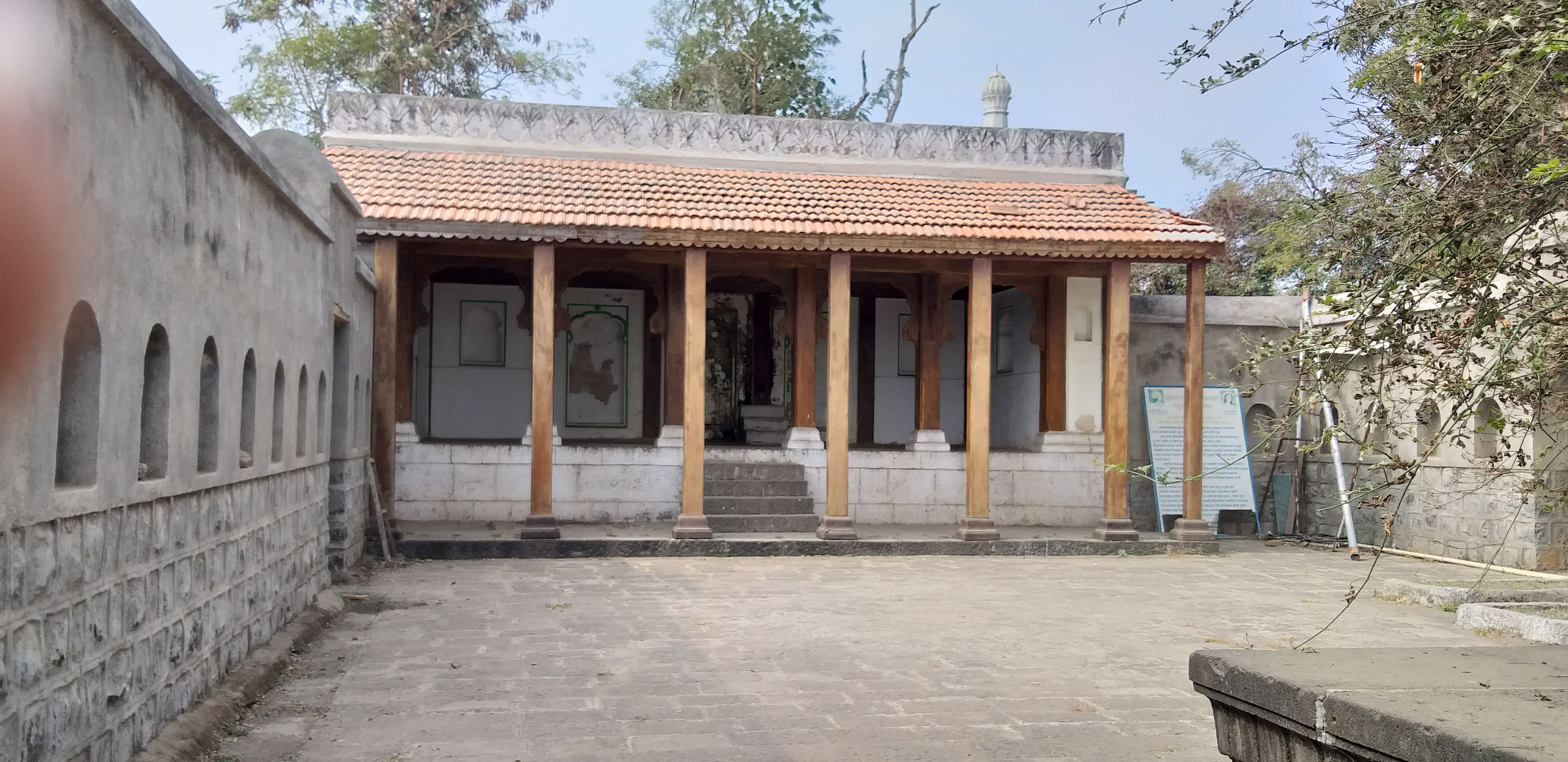
मस्तानी कबरीचे बांधकाम

== Religion ==
The majority of the population in the village is Hindu.

The village also has an ancient Jain temple. Devotees from Pune and Mumbai flock here for pujan and darshan quite frequently.

== Economy ==
The majority of the population has farming as their primary occupation.

== Climate ==
The general climate here is hot and dry. According to the climate change, there are mainly three seasons in each year. Summer from March to May, monsoon from June to October and winter from November to February. The climate is cold in winter. The average annual rainfall in the village is up to 470 mm.

== See also ==
- Vigyan Ashram
- Shirur, Maharashtra
- Shri Bhairavnath Vidya Mandir, Pabal
