= Kalamb =

Kalamb may refer to the following entities associated with Maharashtra, India:

- Kalamb, Osmanabad, a town in Osmanabad District
  - Kalamb Tahsil
- Kalamb Beach, a beach near Mumbai
- Kalamb, Ambegaon, a village in Pune District
- Kalamb Karjat, a village in Karjat Taluka, Raigad District
- Kalamb, Yavatmal, a village in Yavatmal District
- Neolamarckia cadamba, a tree known in Marathi as "kalamb"

== See also ==
- Kala Amb, a town in Himachal Pradesh
