= Alegaon Paga =

Village in Maharashtra

- village
- Location in Maharashtra, India Alegaon Paga (India)
- Coordinates: 18°37′10″N 074°20′04″E
- Country: India
- State: Maharashtra
- District: Pune
- Taluka: Shirur

Government
  - Type: Panchayati raj (India)
  - Body: Gram panchayat

Population (2001)
  - Total: 2,610

Languages
  - Official: Marathi
- Time zone: UTC+5:30 (IST)
- ISO 3166 code: IN-MH
- Vehicle registration: MH
- Lok Sabha constituency: Shirur
- Vidhan Sabha constituency: Shirur
- Website: pune.nic.in

Alegaon Paga is a panchayat village in the state of Maharashtra, India. The village is 2.6 kilometres east of the Bhima River. Administratively, Alegaon Paga is under Shirur Taluka of Pune District in Maharashtra. The village of Alegaon Paga is 5.5 km by road north of the village of Ranjangaon Sandas, and 31 km by road south of the town of Shirur.

There are two villages in the Alegaon Paga gram panchayat: Alegaon Paga and Arangaon.

== Demographics ==
In the 2001 census, the village of Alegaon Paga had 2,610 inhabitants, with 1,347 males (51.6%) and 1,263 females (48.4%), for a gender ratio of 938 females per thousand males.

As per 2011 census village Total population is 3183 in which 1653 are male and 1530 are female

https://censusindia.gov.in/census.website/data/population-finder

== See also ==
- Shirur Taluka
