= Ranjangaon Sandas =

Village in Maharashtra

- village
- Location in Maharashtra, India Ranjangaon Sandas (India)
- Coordinates: 18°34′19″N 074°20′41″E
- Country: India
- State: Maharashtra
- District: Pune
- Taluka: Shirur

Government
  - Body: Gram panchayat

Population (2001)
  - Total: 3,593

Languages
  - Official: Marathi
- Time zone: UTC+5:30 (IST)
- PIN: 412211
- ISO 3166 code: IN-MH
- Vehicle registration: MH
- Lok Sabha constituency: Shirur
- Vidhan Sabha constituency: Shirur
- Website: pune.nic.in

Ranjangaon Sandas is a panchayat village in the state of Maharashtra, India, on the left (east) bank of the Bhima River just above its intersection with the Mula-Mutha River. Administratively, Ranjangaon Sandas is under Shirur Taluka of Pune District in Maharashtra. The village of Ranjangaon Sandas is 5.5 km by road south of the village of Alegaon Paga, and 38 km by road south of the town of Shirur.

There are two villages in the Ranjangaon Sandas gram panchayat: Ranjangaon Sandas and Rakshewadi (Rakshevadi). Rakshewadi is located just over 2 km north of Ranjangaon Sandas.

== Demographics ==
In the 2001 census, the village of Ranjangaon Sandus had 3,593 inhabitants, with 1,856 males (51.6%) and 1,737 females (48.4%), for a gender ratio of 936 females per thousand males.

== Education ==
Zilha parishad school up 7th standard. Ranjangaon Sandas has a secondary school: Shri. Santraj Maharaj Vidyalaya. this vidyalaya was established by Shantaram Vaman Randive and Advocate Prakash Shitole.
