= Ambegaon (disambiguation) =

Ambegaon may refer to one of the following places in India:

- Ambegaon, a town in Pune district, Maharashtra
- Ambegaon tehsil, a tehsil in Pune district
- Ambegaon (village), a village in Pune district
- Ambegaon (Vidhan Sabha constituency)
