= Kukdeshwar Temple =

Shiva temple in Pune district, India

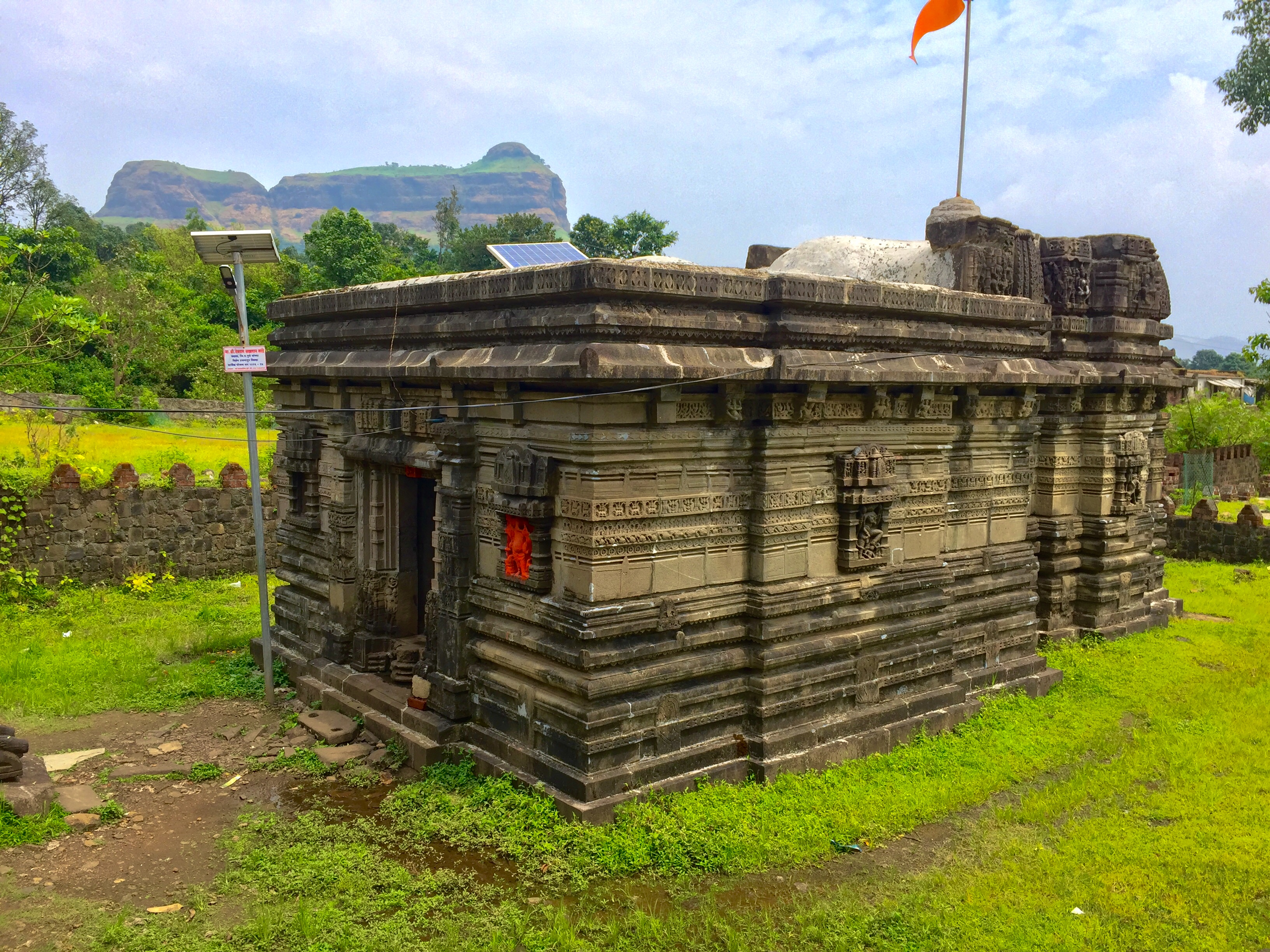

Religion
- Affiliation: Hinduism
- District: Pune District
- Deity: Lord Shiva

Location
- Location: Pune District
- State: Maharashtra
- Country: India
- Interactive map of Kukdeshwar Temple

Kukdeshwar Temple is located in Pune District of Maharashtra, India. It is about 15 km west of Junnar and lies on the banks of Kukadi River. It is a Shiv temple noted for its beautiful sculptures and carvings. The roof of this temple is in a dilapidated state. Chavand fort, also known as Prasannagad, is approximately 3 km from Kukdeshwar temple. Nearest Town is Junnar.
