= Pimpale Khalsa =

Village in Maharashtra

- Village
- Location in Maharashtra, India Pimpale Khalsa (India)
- Coordinates: 18.45°N 74.08°E
- Country: India
- State: Maharashtra
- District: Pune district

Languages
  - Official: Marathi
- Time zone: UTC+5:30 (IST)
- PIN: 412208
- Nearest city: Shirur

Pimpale Khalsa is a village in the Shirur taluka of Pune district in Maharashtra, India. Pimple Khalsa is other variation for the same name somewhere else.
