= Yedsi Ramling Ghat Wildlife Sanctuary =

Protected area in Maharashtra, India

Yedshi Ramling Ghat Wildlife Sanctuary
- IUCN category IV (habitat/species management area)
- Location within Maharashtra Location within India
- Interactive map of Yedshi Ramling Ghat Wildlife Sanctuary
- Location: Dharashiv district, Maharashtra, India
- Nearest city: Osmanabad and Latur
- Coordinates: 18°18′18″N 75°56′24″E
- Area: 22.37 km^{2} (8.64 sq mi)
- Established: 23 May 1997
- Governing body: Maharashtra State Forest Department

The Yedshi Ramling Ghat Wildlife Sanctuary is located in Osmanabad district. Yedshi Ramling Sanctuary has headquarters at Yedshi. It is situated 20 km from Osmanabad city and 95 km from Beed city. The Latur-Barshi highway passes through the sanctuary. The sanctuary is situated in Kalamb, Bhansgaon and Wadgaon villages of Osmanabad and Kalamb Tehsil of Osmanabad district. It is situated in the Balaghat mountain range of the Sahyadri. In 1997, the government declared an area of 2237.5 hectares as 'Ramling Ghat' Sanctuary for the protection of various plants, animals and birds. It is also known as hill station as it is high above sea level.

== Location ==
The nearest rail head is Yedshi Town of Maharashtra state which is 5 km from the sanctuary. Regular buses are available from Barshi, Osmanabad and Latur Bus Stand. The sanctuary is open for visitors from sunrise to sunset. There are many hotels and resorts located near Yedshi and Osmanabad towns.

== Management ==
The Yedshi Ramling Ghat sanctuary is a part of Aurangabad Wildlife Division.The Range Forest Officer( Wildlife) located at Yedshi is in charge of the sanctuary. The Barsi Light Railway line built in 1907 connecting Kurduwadi to Latur passes through the sanctuary.

== Flora ==
The forest types is of the type of South tropical (regional) arid deciduous forests and thorny forests. Most of the forest area is hilly wooded land with patches of scrub land. The common trees found are Apta, Sag, Sandalwood, Guggul / Salai, Neem, Bhera, Garadi, Savar, Ain, Bor, Dhaman, Sitaphal, Saada, Moh, Medshing, Behda, Acacia catechu (Khair), Acacia leucophloea (Hiwar), Acacia nilotica(Babul), Aegle marmelos (Bel), Albizzia lebbek, Albizzia procera, Anogeissus latifolia (Dhawda), Butea monosperma (Palas), Boswellia serrata (Salaia),Ficus and Terminalia species. The common shrubs include Vites negundo, zizyphus species, Cassia auriculata(tarwad), Carissa carandas, and Helicteres isora(Murudsheng) and Ghaneri shrubs are also found in large numbers here. Apart from these, the forest department has planted a large number of trees like Bor, Shisam, Subabhul, Glyricidia here

== Fauna ==
The animals include leopard, wildcat, sloth bear, blackbuck, jackal, wolf, fox, monitor lizards, porcupine, barking deer, and hares. More than 100 species of birds are recorded in the sanctuary area.

== Tourist Places ==
The major tourist place is Ramling temple which is a famous religious Lord Shiva temple. The sanctuary is accessible in the entire year. However the best months to visit are from October to June. There is a forest rest house at Yedshi. There is a railway resthouse on Durgadevi hilltop near Ramling temple.

== Threats ==
The threats include illicit cutting, forest fires, encroachment, hunting and trespassing. The spread of shrubby weed Lantana camara is causing damage to the grasslands. The animals in the sanctuary face water scarcity during summer.
