= Vigyan Ashram =

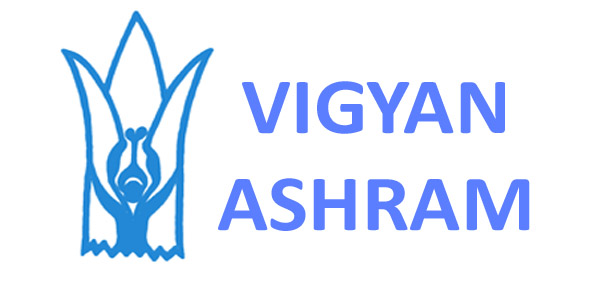
- Vigyan Ashram logo

Location
- Pabal, Shirur taluka, Pune district India
- Coordinates: 18.832271°N 74.059181°E

Information
- Established: 1983
- Campus type: Rural
- Website: Official website

Vigyan Ashram is a school for the study of ancient Indian philosophy belonging to the Indian Institute of Education (IIE), Pune, established by S. S. Kalbag in 1983. It emulates the modern version of the old Gurukula system of 'simple living and high thinking'.

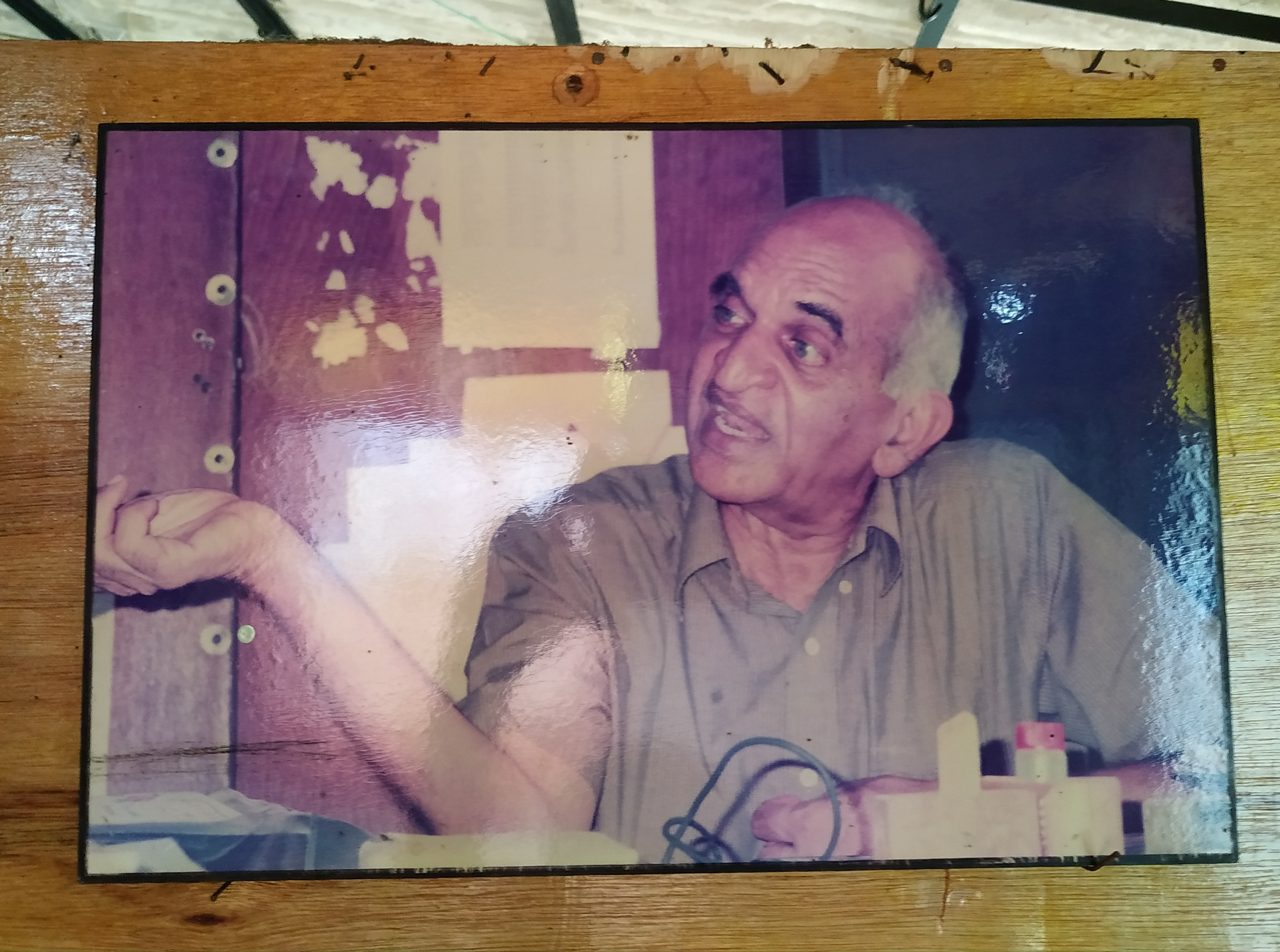
Photo of S.S. Kalbag in Vigyan Ashram

Vigyan Ashram is situated on Shirur Road, Rajgurunagar, approximately 70 km (43 mi) from Pune.

In English, "Vigyan" means 'search of truth' and "Ashram" symbolizes 'simple living, an organization where all are considered equal'.

== Educations ==
=== Fab Lab ===
Vigyan Ashram runs a fabrication laboratory to teach the use of various tools and produces locally made gadgets.

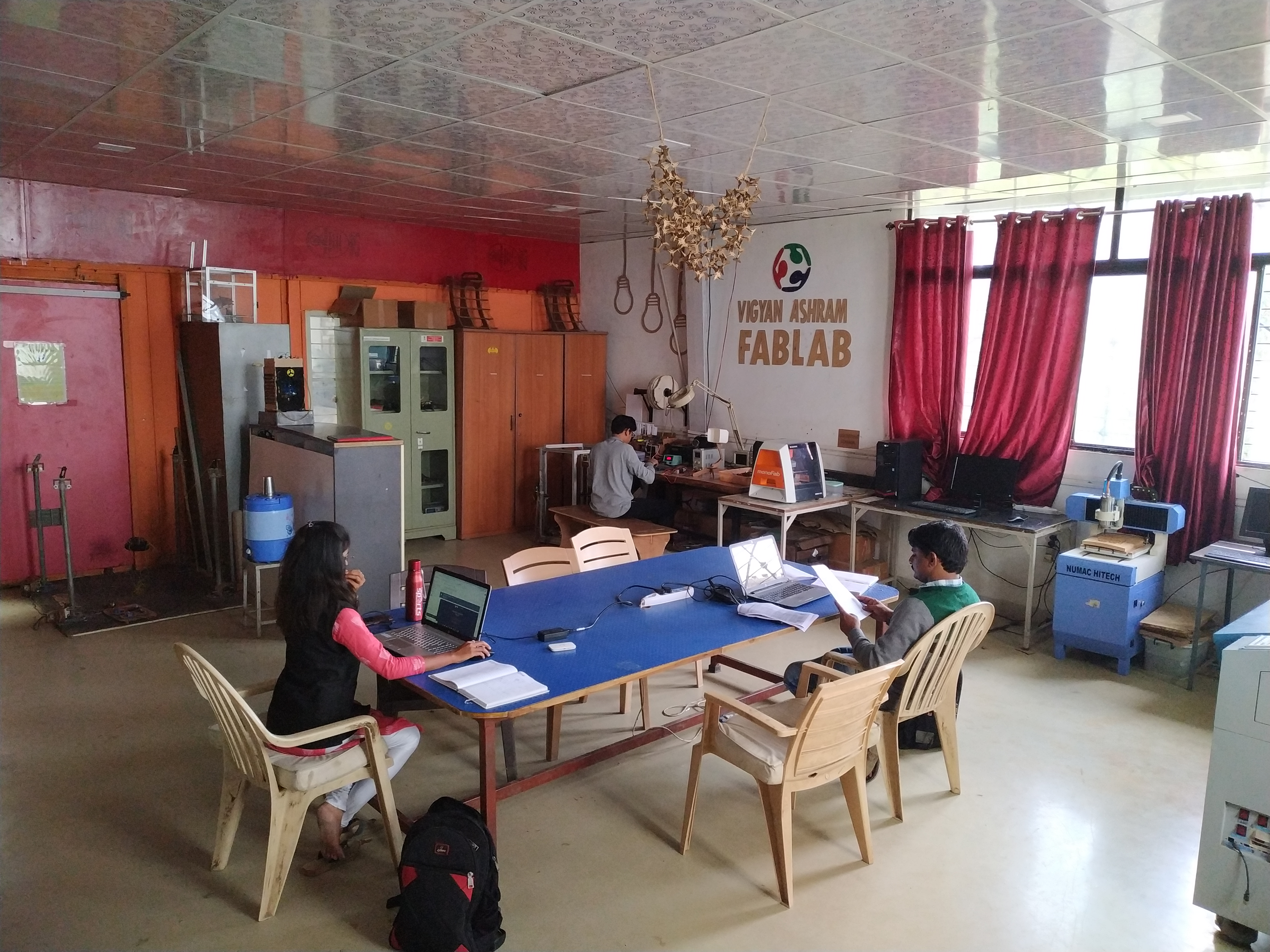
Inside of Vigyan Ashram's Fab Lab

=== Diploma in Basic Rural Technology (DBRT) ===
Diploma in Basic Rural Technology is a one-year residential diploma course offered at Vigyan Ashram. This course is recognized by the National Institute of Open Schooling.

== See also ==
- Shri Bhairavnath Vidya Mandir, Pabal
