= Dimbhe Dam =

Dimbhe dam
- Location within Maharashtra
- Official name: Dimbhe dam
- Location: Ambegaon
- Coordinates: 19.1146738°N 73.7220996°E
- Opening date: 1992-1993
- Owners: Government of Maharashtra, India

Dam and spillways
- Type of dam: Gravity
- Impounds: Ghod river
- Height: 67.21 m (220.5 ft)
- Length: 852 m (2,795 ft)
- Dam volume: 1,151.23 km^{3} (276.19 cu mi)

Reservoir
- Total capacity: 38,220,000 m^{3} (1.350×10^{9} cu ft)
- Surface area: 17,547 km^{2} (6,775 sq mi)

DIMBHE DAM, is a gravity dam on Ghod River near Ambegaon, Pune district in State of Maharashtra in India.

== Specifications ==
The height of the dam above lowest foundation is 67.21 m (220.5 ft) while the length is 852 m (2,795 ft). The volume content is 1,151.23 km^{3} (276.19 cu mi) and gross storage capacity is 38,220,000.00 m^{3} (1.349726562×10^{9} cu ft). The dam is located in the Ghod basin and is part of the Kukadi project, which constructed five dams in the region. Other dams included in this project are Yedgaon Dam, Manikdoh Dam, Pimpalgaon Joge Dam and Wadaj Dam. A 5 MW power house is also built at the foot of this dam DIMBHE DAM in near SHINOLIGAON

== Purpose ==
- Irrigation for the 19 villages on the fringes of the dam. It provides irrigation to about 34,000 acres of land.

== See also ==
- Dams in Maharashtra
- List of reservoirs and dams in India
