= Ghod Dam =

- Location within Maharashtra
- Official name: Ghod Dam D01023
- Location: Shirur
- Coordinates: 18.6779591°N 74.4923687°E
- Opening date: 1965
- Owners: Government of Maharashtra, India

Dam and spillways
- Type of dam: Earthfill
- Impounds: Ghod River
- Height: 29.6 m (97 ft)
- Length: 3,300 m (10,800 ft)
- Dam volume: 1,020 km^{3} (240 cu mi)

Reservoir
- Total capacity: 154,800 km^{3} (37,100 cu mi)
- Surface area: 30,992 km^{2} (11,966 sq mi)

Ghod Dam, originally called Pava Dam, is an earthfill dam on the Ghod River near Shirur, Pune district in the state of Maharashtra in India. Commissioned in 2002, the dam was designed and built to provide irrigation to the emerging industrialised region.

The dam was one of many hastily constructed projects designed to keep apace India's ever-growing population, hence the need to make existing farmland in the region more productive. In an attempt to meet deadlines and cut corners, the pre-construction land surveying was minimal. Upon completion in 2005, the reservoir, which was originally intended to cover 820 sq miles, spilled onto Ghod plains, covering an extra 370 sq miles with several feet of water. The area affected was made worse by the notoriously poor drainage properties of the land in the region. It affected three villages with a total population of approximately 4,550. Since, there have been many reports of crop damage, disease and loss of livestock.

== Specifications ==
The height of the dam above its lowest foundation is 29.6 m (97 ft), while the length is 3,300 m (10,800 ft). The volume content is 1,020 km^{3} (240 cu mi), and the gross storage capacity is 216,300.00 km^{3} (51,893.13 cu mi).

== See also ==
- Dams in Maharashtra
- List of reservoirs and dams in India
