= Kanhersar =

Village in Maharashtra

- Village
- Location in Maharashtra, India Kanhersar (India)
- Coordinates: 18°49′51″N 074°03′10″E
- Country: India
- State: Maharashtra
- District: Pune
- Taluka: Khed

Population (2011)
  - Total: 3,558

Languages
  - Official: Marathi
- Time zone: UTC+5:30 (IST)
- PIN: 410505
- Vehicle registration: MH-12, MH-14
- Lok Sabha constituency: Shirur
- Vidhan Sabha constituency: Khed Alandi

Kanhersar is a panchayat village in Khed Taluka in Pune district of state of Maharashtra, India. The village is known for its historical significance, cultural heritage, and connection to prominent figures in Indian judiciary.

== Geography ==
Kanhersar is situated near the Welu River and is accessible via Maharashtra State Highway 54. The village falls under the postal code 410505, with Rajgurunagar as its nearest sub-post office.

== Historical Significance ==
Kanhersar is home to the Chandrachud Wada, a historic structure built by Gangadhar Chandrachud, the Fadnis of Subhedar Malhar Rao Holkar during the Peshwa era. Originally a grand structure covering 3.5 acres, the wada included courtyards, temples, and residential quarters. Though parts of the wada have collapsed or undergone modern renovations, the eastern fortification wall and portions of its traditional architecture still stand. The wada is also home to the Samadhi Temple of Late Hari Lakshman Chandrachud, which features intricate woodwork.

== Religious and Cultural Heritage ==
The village houses the Yamai Mata Temple, a revered site of worship. According to local folklore, the Yamai Goddess incarnated at Kanhersar due to the blessings of Shri Saint Kanhuraj Maharaj in the 12th century.

== Infrastructure ==
Kanhersar is served by basic amenities, with the Thitewadi Bandhara dam located nearby. Efforts by locals are underway to preserve the cultural and architectural heritage of the village.

== Economy ==
The majority of the population has farming as their primary occupation due to good soil and environmental conditions.

== Climate ==
The general climate here is hot and dry. According to the climate change, there are mainly three seasons in each year. Summer from March to May, monsoon from June to October and winter from November to February. The climate is cold in winter. The average annual rainfall in the village is up to 470 mm.

== Prominent personalities ==
Kanhersar has gained recognition as the native village of Justice Dhananjaya Y. Chandrachud, the 50th Chief Justice of India, and his father, Justice Yeshwant Vishnu Chandrachud, the 16th Chief Justice of India. The Chandrachud family maintains their ancestral connection to the village, preserving their 250-year-old wada and visiting annually to pay homage to their family deity, Devi Nimgaon Khandoba.

== See also ==
- Vigyan Ashram
- Khed Taluka
