= Nighoj =

Village in Maharashtra

- village
- Location in Maharashtra, India Nighoj (India)
- Coordinates: 18°57′35″N 074°16′37″E
- Country: India
- State: Maharashtra
- District: Ahmadnagar
- Taluka: Parner

Government
  - Body: Village panchayat

Population (2011)
  - Total: 13,600

Languages
  - Official: Marathi
- Time zone: UTC+5:30 (IST)
- PIN: 414 306
- Telephone code: 02488
- Vehicle registration: MH-16, MH-17
- Lok Sabha constituency: Ahmednagar
- Vidhan Sabha constituency: Parner
- Nearest towns: Parner, Shirur, Alkuti

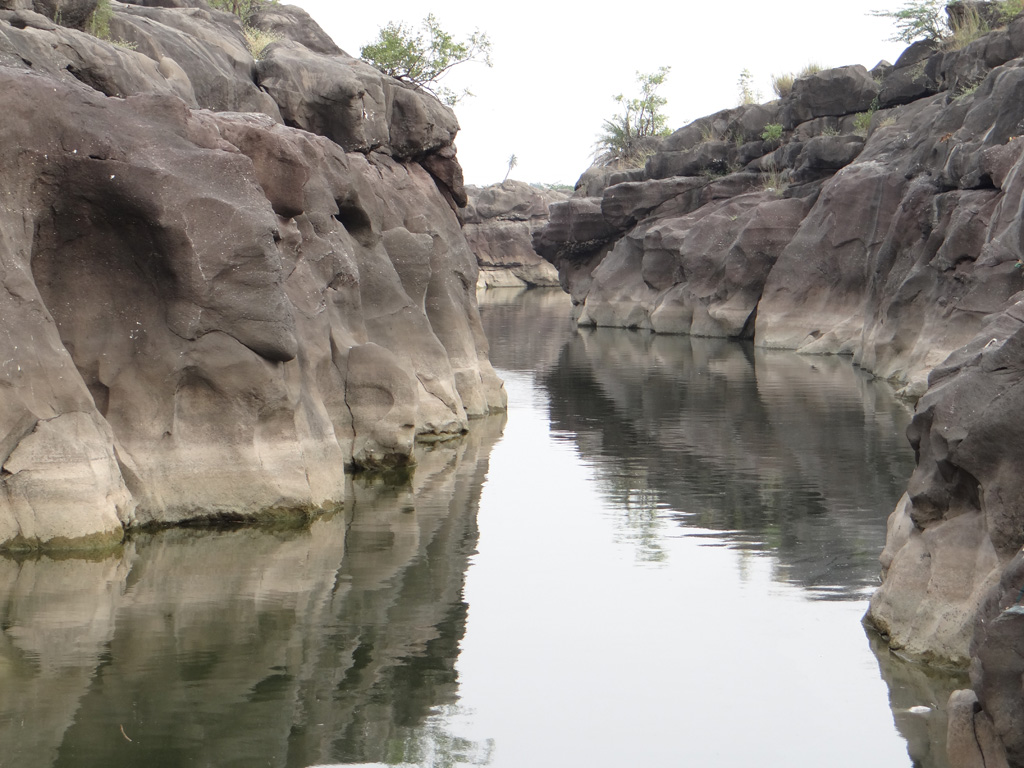
Potholes in Nighoj river

Nighoj is a village in Ahmednagar District, Maharashtra, India. It is about 90 km away from Pune and had naturally created potholes (tinajas) on the riverbed of the Kukadi River.

Geologists indicate that formerly there was greater rainfall in the area and that the Kukadi River flowed out from the highlands, scouring the bedrock and forming the potholes and the gorge.

== Religion ==
The majority of the population in Nighoj is Hindu, but there are also Muslims. There are several temples in the village, one of which, the Malaganga temple, is located on the bank of the gorge on the old river-bed itself.

== See also ==
- Parner tehsil
- List of Villages in Parner Tehsil
