= Pimpalgaon Joge Dam =

- Location within Maharashtra
- Official name: Pimpalgaon Joge Dam
- Location: Junnar
- Coordinates: 19.3247468°N 73.8367694°E
- Opening date: 1999
- Owners: Government of Maharashtra, India

Dam and spillways
- Type of dam: Earthfill
- Impounds: AR Pushpavti river
- Height: 28.6 m (94 ft)
- Length: 1,560 m (5,120 ft)
- Dam volume: 2,010 km^{3} (480 cu mi)

Reservoir
- Total capacity: 110,240 km^{3} (26,450 cu mi)
- Surface area: 263,000 km^{2} (102,000 sq mi)

Pimpalgaon Joge Dam, is an earthfill dam on Ar Pushpavati river, a tributary of Kukadi River near Junnar, Pune district in the state of Maharashtra in India.

== Specifications ==
The height of the dam above lowest foundation is 28.6 m (94 ft) while the length is 1,560 m (5,120 ft). The volume content is 2,010 km^{3} (480 cu mi) and gross storage capacity is 235,520.00 km^{3} (56,504.25 cu mi). The dam is located in the Ghod basin and is part of the Kukadi project, which constructed five dams in the region. Other dams included in this project are Yedgaon Dam, Manikdoh Dam, Dimbhe Dam and Wadaj Dam. As of 2010, the annual average rainfall in the catchment area of this dam was 900 mm.

== Purpose ==
- Irrigation

The dam provides water to areas of Otur, Junnar, Narayangaon, Alephata and Parner, which are basically grape harvesting areas.

== See also ==
- Dams in Maharashtra
- List of reservoirs and dams in India
