= Nimgaon Mhalungi =

Village in Maharashtra

Coordinates: 18.695°N 74.225°E

Nimgaon Mhalungi is a village located in the Shirur subdivision of Pune district, Maharashtra.

It is situated on the banks of Kamini river.
