= Kukadi River =

Kukadi
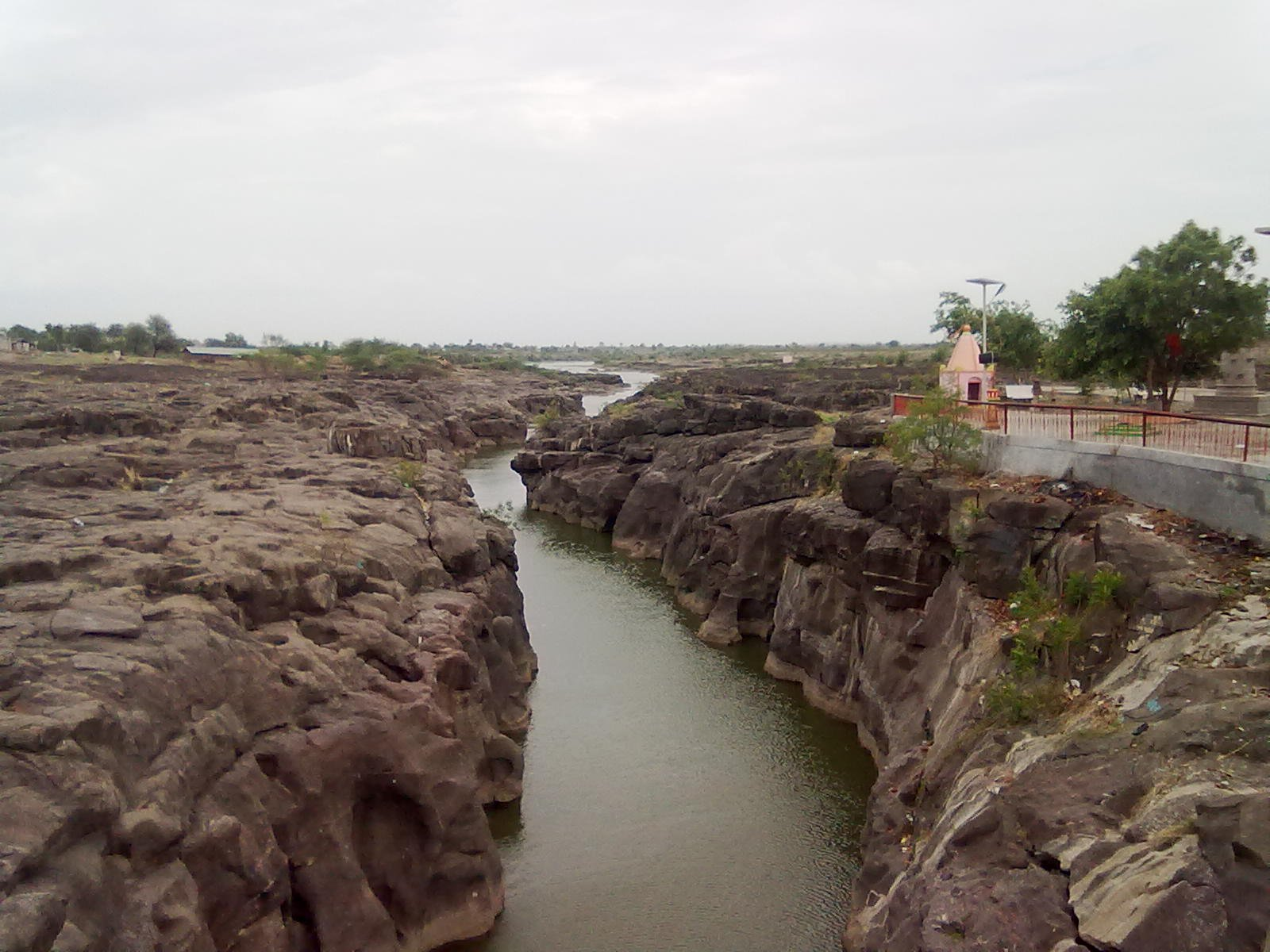

Location
- Country: India
- State: Maharashtra
- District: Pune

Physical characteristics
- Source: Western Ghats
  - location: Kukdeshewar
- Mouth: Ghod River
  - location: Shirur

Basin features
- Tributaries
  - right: Pushpawati River

Kukadi River (alternate spelling: Kukdi) is a river of Maharashtra, India, a tributary of the Ghod River. Its origin is near Kukdeshwar, where Lord Mahadeva's ancient temple is situated on the origin of Kukadi River. Several notable temples lie on its banks including the Vigneshwara Temple, Ozar and Malanga Devi temple. The Yedgaon Dam dams the river, creating an artificial lake. During the months when it is visible, the riverbed is considered to be a wonder of nature, characterized by rock erosion from water movement and gorges that are gouged with large potholes. Folk tales abound about the river. The river valley is characterized by grape vineyards.

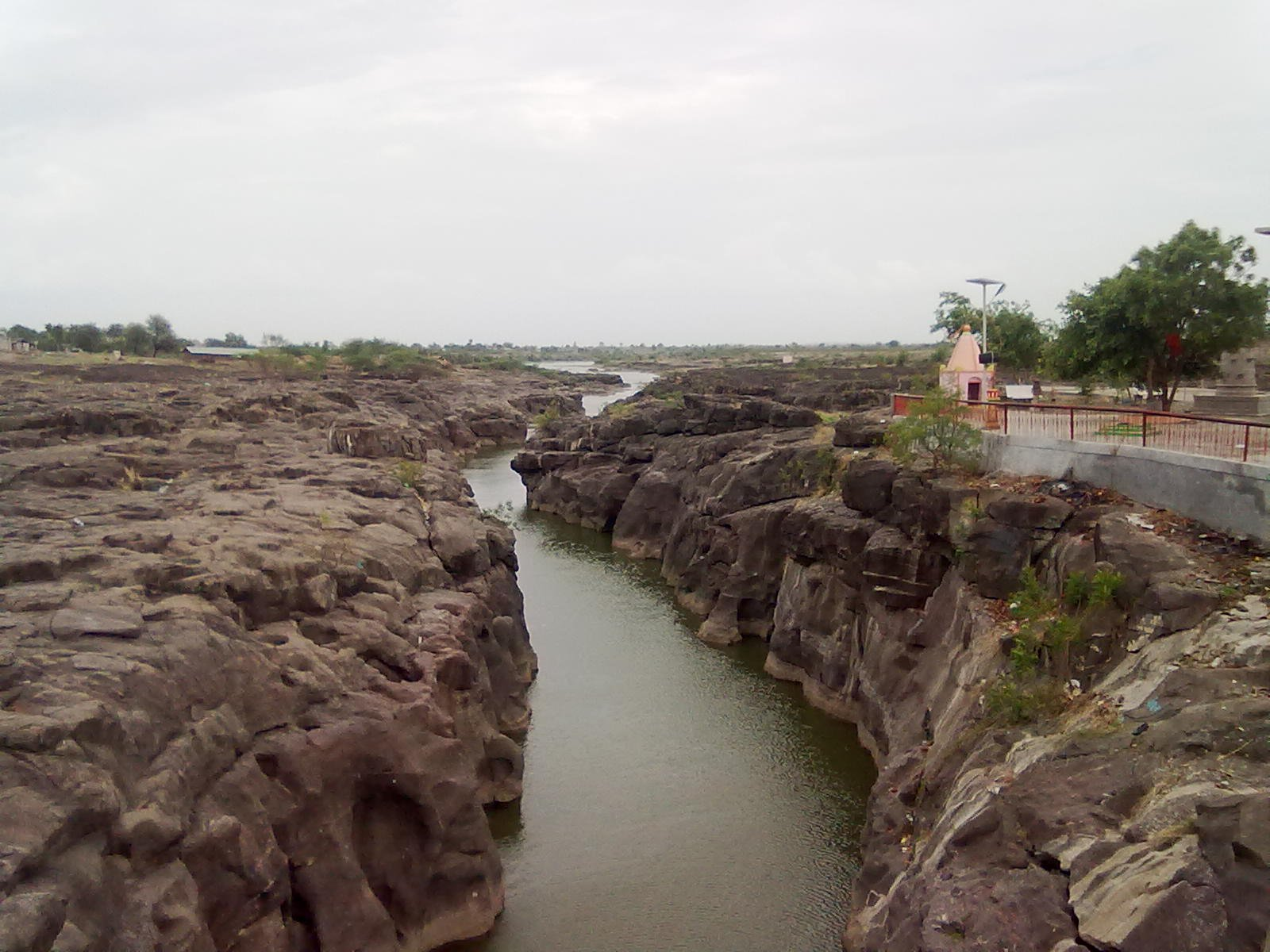
The Kukadi River in Takali Haji

== Geography ==
Coordinates:

At Junnar 19°13′2″N 73°52′0″E
Mouth: 18°51′20″N 74°18′23″E

The Kukadi, originating in the Western Ghats, is an easterly flowing tributary of the Ghod. The source of the river lies in the Western Ghats near Naneghat. The river passes to the north of Junnar and is situated outside Nighoj, near a road to Shirur. The Kukadi's tributaries include the tributeeies from the villages of Dimbhe, Manikdoh, Pimplegaon Joge, Wadaj, and Yedgaon. The river rises in the Western Ghat's high rainfall zone where the annual rainfall is greater than 4,000 millimetres (160 in).

== Projects ==
=== Kukadi L.B. Canal Project ===
In 1900, the Kukadi L.B. Canal Project conducted a survey to ascertain whether the Ghod River supply could be combined with the Kukadi to supply the famine area of Solapur. The low-level rising contour, started from Kem, Maharashtra in the previous year, was continued and completed up to the Kukadi River. A canal line was also aligned from that river up to the Ghod River. Three more contours were run for the Nirgudsar Tank on the latter river, and an alternative dam site was examined at Sakora. The surveys, difficult and extensive, indicated that the Ghod water could be made available for the famine districts.

=== Kukadi Irrigation Project ===
The Kukadi Irrigation Project is a program underway by the Maharashtra Krishna Valley Development Corporation. Approved in 1968, it is almost complete, with the remaining work on some of the distributary systems still in process. It includes five storage dams across the five tributaries; viz. Yedgaon Dam, Manikdoh Dam, Dimbhe Dam, Wadaj Dam and Pimpalgaon Joge Dam.
