= Yedgaon Dam =

- Location within Maharashtra
- Official name: Yedgaon Dam
- Location: Junnar
- Coordinates: 19.1717572°N 74.0036243°E
- Opening date: 1977
- Owners: Government of Maharashtra, India

Dam and spillways
- Type of dam: Earthfill; Gravity
- Impounds: Kukadi River
- Height: 29.74 m (97.6 ft)
- Length: 4,511 m (14,800 ft)
- Dam volume: 1,004 km^{3} (241 cu mi)

Reservoir
- Total capacity: 79,270 km^{3} (19,020 cu mi)
- Surface area: 1,700 km^{2} (660 sq mi)

Yedgaon Dam, is an earthfill and gravity dam on Kukadi river near Junnar, Pune district, in the state of Maharashtra in India.

== Specifications ==
The height of the dam above its lowest foundation is 29.74 m (97.6 ft) while the length is 4,511 m (14,800 ft). The volume content is 1,004 km^{3} (241 cu mi) and gross storage capacity is 93,430.00 km^{3} (22,415.05 cu mi). The dam is located in the Ghod basin and is part of the Kukadi project, which constructed five dams in the region. Other dams included in this project are Wadaj Dam, Manikdoh Dam, Dimbhe Dam, and Pimpalgaon Joge Dam.

== Purpose ==
- Irrigation
- Yedgoan is one of the top producer of tomatoes in Junnar.
- Yedgon dam provide the strong water resource to the agricultural farming in the yedgaon village.

== See also ==
- Dams in Maharashtra
- List of reservoirs and dams in India
