= Zilla Parishad Primary School Kardelwadi =

Coordinates: 18.8115849°N 74.3155375°E

- Kardelwadi

Information
- School type: Primary school
- School district: Pune district
- Headmaster: Dattatray Sakat
- Faculty: 2
- Gender: Co-education
- Enrollment: 100
- Website: http://www.zpeschoolkardelwadi.org/

Zilla Parishad Primary School Kardelwadi is a primary school run by Zilla Parishad, Pune, a district belonging to Maharashtra an Indian state. The school is located at Kardelwadi village in Shirur taluka a sub-division of Pune district., The school is notable for being the only school in Maharashtra that works each and every day of the year, for the past 15 years. The school is a two teacher school, the teachers being Dattatray Sakat and his wife Bebinanda. Heramb Kulkarni an activist and commentator on education in Maharashtra, writing in Loksatta, mentions the school as an example of excellence in public education in the state, he notes that in consideration of the quality of education imparted by the school, students not only from Kardelwadi but also from the surrounding villages study in the school. It is a Marathi medium school. Every year they receive thousands of application for admissions.

== Awards and achievements ==
- National Award from the President on Teacher’s Day- 2015 (5 September) to Bebinanda.
- State Quality Improvement Award in 2010.

=== Initiative by Subhash Kusalkar ===
Subhash Kusalkar a sixty five year old migrant stone quarry worker worked and lived on Raghunath Kardile's stone quarry in Kardelwadi for 12 years. Despite being illiterate he wished his grandchildren and others belong to his community be educated. He encouraged the parents of 23 children to stop migrating for work and relocate from their homes in Buldhana district to Kardelwadi so that the children get the opportunity to go to Kardelwadi school impressed by the quality of education the school offered. The students who couldn't read and write earlier, gained those skills, could write with a clean hand and showed a remarkable all round improvement in their academic performance in just three months.

== Media ==
- On DD Sahyadri.
- On IBN Lokmat.
