= Manikdoh Dam =

- Location within Maharashtra
- Official name: Manikdoh Dam
- Location: Junnar
- Coordinates: 19.2353041°N 73.7914508°E
- Opening date: 1984
- Owners: Government of Maharashtra, India

Dam and spillways
- Type of dam: Gravity
- Impounds: Kukadi river
- Height: 51.8 m (170 ft)
- Length: 930 m (3,050 ft)
- Dam volume: 596 km^{3} (143 cu mi)

Reservoir
- Total capacity: 283,070 km^{3} (67,910 cu mi)
- Surface area: 18,434 km^{2} (7,117 sq mi)

Manikdoh Dam, is a gravity dam on Kukadi River near Junnar, Pune district in state of Maharashtra in India.

== Specifications ==
The height of the dam above lowest foundation is 51.8 m (170 ft) while the length is 930 m (3,050 ft). The volume content is 596 km^{3} (143 cu mi) and gross storage capacity is 308,060.00 km^{3} (73,907.52 cu mi). The dam is located in the Ghod basin and is part of the Kukadi project, which constructed five dams in the region. Other dams included in this project are Yedgaon Dam, Pimpalgaon Joge Dam, Dimbhe Dam and Wadaj Dam. A 6 MW power house is also built at the foot of this dam.

== Purpose ==
- Irrigation
- Hydroelectricity

== See also ==
- Dams in Maharashtra
- List of reservoirs and dams in India
