= Ramling =

Village in Maharashtra

- village
- Interactive map of Ramling
- Country: India
- State: Maharashtra
- District: Pune

Languages
  - Official: Marathi
- Time zone: UTC+5:30 (IST)

Ramling (Old Shirur) is a village in Pune district, Maharashtra, India, on a distance of 3km from Shirur on the way towards Pabal.

The village is known for a famous Shiva (Ramling) Temple.
