= Wadaj Dam =

- Location within Maharashtra
- Official name: Wadaj Dam
- Location: Junnar
- Coordinates: 19.1522992°N 73.849129°E
- Opening date: 1983
- Owners: Government of Maharashtra, India

Dam and spillways
- Type of dam: Earthfill; Gravity
- Impounds: Meena river
- Height: 30.7 m (101 ft)
- Length: 1,875 m (6,152 ft)
- Dam volume: 1,009 km^{3} (242 cu mi)

Reservoir
- Total capacity: 33,200 km^{3} (8,000 cu mi)
- Surface area: 467 km^{2} (180 sq mi)

Wadaj Dam, is an earthfill and gravity dam on Meena river near Junnar, Pune district in the state of Maharashtra in India.

== Specifications ==
The height of the dam above its lowest foundation is 30.7 m (101 ft) while the length is 1,875 m (6,152 ft). The volume content is 1,009 km^{3} (242 cu mi) and gross storage capacity is 36,000.00 km^{3} (8,636.86 cu mi). The dam is located in the Ghod basin and is part of the Kukadi project, which constructed five dams in the region. Other dams included in this project are Yedgaon Dam, Manikdoh Dam, Dimbhe Dam and Pimpalgaon Joge Dam.

== Purpose ==
- Irrigation

== See also ==
- Dams in Maharashtra
- List of reservoirs and dams in India
