= Majgaon, Mawal =

Village in Maharashtra

Majgaon
- Village
- Location in Maharashtra, India Majgaon (India)
- Coordinates: 18.8525158°N 73.0919605°E
- Country: India
- State: Maharashtra
- District: Pune
- Tehsil: Mawal

Government
  - Type: Panchayati Raj
  - Body: Gram panchayat

Area
  - Total: 217 ha (540 acres)

Population (2011)
  - Total: 16
  - Density: 7.4/km^{2} (19/sq mi)
- Sex ratio 7 /9 ♂/♀

Languages
  - Official: Marathi
  - Other spoken: Hindi
- Time zone: UTC+5:30 (IST)
- Pin code: 410405
- Telephone code: 02114
- ISO 3166 code: IN-MH
- Vehicle registration: MH-14
- Website: pune.nic.in

Majgaon is a village in India, situated in Mawal taluka of Pune district in the state of Maharashtra. It encompasses an area of 217 ha (536 acres).

== Administration ==
The village is administrated by a sarpanch, an elected representative who leads a gram panchayat. At the time of the 2011 Census of India, the gram panchayat governed five villages and was based at Ambegaon.

== Demographics ==
At the 2011 census, the village comprised 3 households. The population of 16 was split between 7 males and 9 females.

== Air travel connectivity ==
The closest airport to the village is Pune Airport.

== See also ==
- List of villages in Mawal taluka
