= Vadgaon Rasai =

Village in Maharashtra

Coordinates: 18.563°N 74.434°E

Vadgaon Rasai (also known as Wadgaon Rasai) is a town in Maharashtra, India. It is located in the Shirur taluka of Pune district. The Bhima river flows through the village. The temple of Rasai Devi is located here.

According to the 2011 census of India, the population of the village is estimated to be 6,383.
