= Takali Haji =

Village in Maharashtra

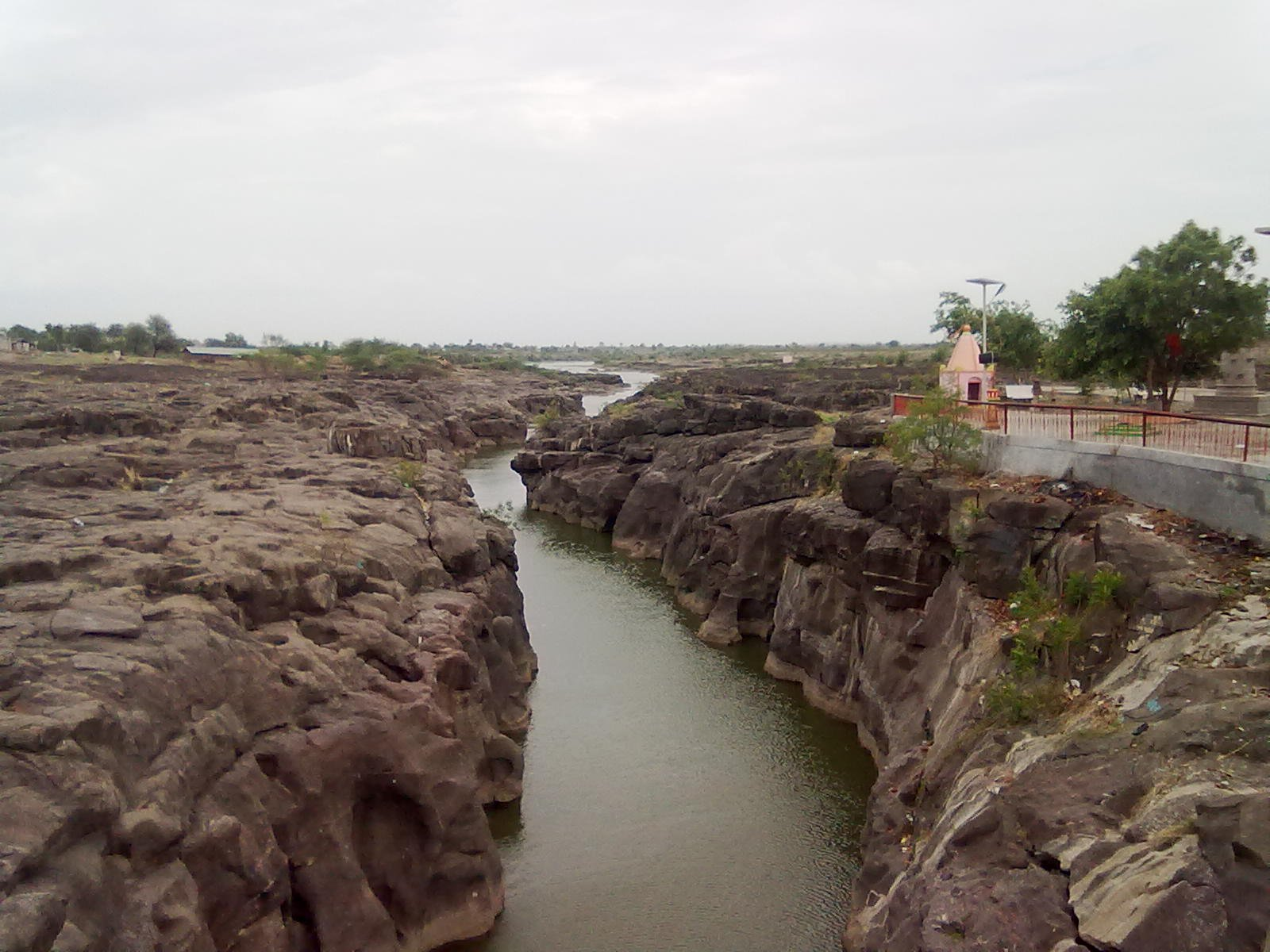
The Kukadi River in Takali Haji.

Takali Haji is a village in the Shirur taluka of the Pune District, Maharashtra, India.

Takali Haji is situated on the bank of the River Ghodnadi and Kukdi.
