= Kamini River =

Indian river

Coordinates: 18°40′04″N 74°15′19″E

The Kamini River is river in Maharashtra, India. It is one of tributaries of Bhima River. The village of Nimgaon Mhalungi is situated on the banks of Kamini river.

In 2019, many fishes died due to the contamination of the Kamini river by discharge of untreated sewage into the river by habitations near Hejamadi village in Udupi district.
