= Shindgaon =

Village in Maharashtra

- Village
- Location in Maharashtra, India Shindgaon (India)
- Coordinates: 18.6882211°N 73.473412°E
- Country: India
- State: Maharashtra
- District: Pune
- Tehsil: Mawal

Government
  - Type: Panchayati Raj
  - Body: Gram panchayat

Area
  - Total: 155.07 ha (383.2 acres)

Population (2011)
  - Total: 160
  - Density: 100/km^{2} (270/sq mi)
- Sex ratio 82 / 78 ♂/♀

Languages
  - Official: Marathi
  - Other spoken: Hindi
- Time zone: UTC+5:30 (IST)
- Telephone code: 02114
- ISO 3166 code: IN-MH
- Vehicle registration: MH-14
- Website: pune.nic.in

Shindgaon is a village in India. It is situated in the Mawal taluka of Pune district in the state of Maharashtra. It encompasses an area of 155.07 ha (383 acres).

== Administration ==
The village is administrated by a sarpanch, an elected representative who leads a gram panchayat. At the time of the 2011 Census of India, the gram panchayat governed five villages and was based at Ambegaon.

== Demography ==
At the 2011 census, the village comprised 35 households. The population of 160 was split between 82 males and 78 females.

== See also ==
- List of villages in Mawal taluka
