= Gosasi =

Village in Maharashtra

Coordinates: 18.83127°N 73.98058°E

- village
- Interactive map of Gosasi
- Country: India
- State: Maharashtra
- District: Pune

Languages
  - Official: Marathi
- Time zone: UTC+5:30 (IST)
- Vehicle registration: MH-

Gosasi is a very small village in the Khed (Rajgurunagar) Taluka with a population of less than 1,500. It is 13 to 14 km (8.7 mi) from Khed.

== Economy ==
SEZ has acquired some of the village area for development. The Bajaj foundation works with people to improve the villagers' standard of living.

== Awards ==
Gosasi has won many awards in "Sant Gadgebaba Swchata abhiyan", launched by the Maharashtra Government. In this village, people work hard to improve upon the award-winning image of the village.
