= Welu River =

River in Pune District, Maharashtra, India

Welu River Vel River

Location
- Country: India
- State: Maharashtra
- District: Pune
- Taluka: Khed

Physical characteristics
- Source: Sahyadris
  - location: Satgaon Platue ,Ambegaon taluka, Pune District, Maharashtra
  - coordinates: 19°2′5″N 73°50′11″E
- Mouth: Bhima River
  - location: Near Talegaon Damdhere, Taluka Shirur, Pune, Maharashtra
  - coordinates: 19°10′46″N 73°02′24″E
- Length: 68 km (42 mi)
- Basin size: 297.31 Sq.km

Welu River or Vel River is a tributary of Bhima River in Pune district, Maharashtra, India. It originates and flows through the Ambegaon, Khed, Shirur talukas of Pune district.

== Origin and course ==
The Welu rises in the Sahyadris to the north-east of Ambegaon Taluka and crosses Ambegaon from north-west to south-east.

== See also ==
- List of rivers of India
- Rivers of India
