= Ambegaon, Mawal =

Village in Maharashtra, India

Ambegaon
- Village
- Location in Maharashtra, India Ambegaon (India)
- Coordinates: 19.1146805°N 73.4447985°E
- Country: India
- State: Maharashtra
- District: Pune
- Tehsil: Mawal

Government
  - Type: Panchayati Raj
  - Body: Gram panchayat

Area
  - Total: 288 ha (710 acres)

Population (2011)
  - Total: 365
  - Density: 127/km^{2} (328/sq mi)
- Sex ratio 185/180 ♂/♀

Languages
  - Official: Marathi
  - Other spoken: Hindi
- Time zone: UTC+5:30 (IST)
- Pin code: 410405
- Telephone code: 02114
- ISO 3166 code: IN-MH
- Vehicle registration: MH-14
- Website: pune.nic.in

Ambegaon is a village and gram panchayat in India, situated in Mawal taluka of Pune district in the state of Maharashtra. It encompasses an area of 288 ha (712 acres).

== Administration ==
The village is administrated by a sarpanch, an elected representative who leads a gram panchayat. At the time of the 2011 Census of India, the village was the headquarters for the eponymous gram panchayat, which also governed the villages of Majgaon, Pale Pawan Mawal, Pansoli and Shindgaon. Pale Pawan Mawal was uninhabited.

== Demographics ==
At the 2011 census, the village comprised 72 households. The population of 365 was split between 185 males and 180 females.

== See also ==
- List of villages in Mawal taluka
