= Kalamb Beach =

- Suburb
- Location in Maharashtra Location in India
- Coordinates: 19.4034°N 72.7614°E
- Country: India
- State: Maharashtra
- District: Mumbai Suburban District

Languages
  - Official: Marathi, English
- Time zone: UTC+5:30 (IST)

Kalamb Beach is a long, isolated beach located in Nala Sopara, near Ahmedabad highway, Nala Sopara, near Nirmal, India.

== Details ==
Kalamb beach is located at Nalasopara West near Nirmal Village in Palghar District, Far north suburb of Mumbai. Kalamb is the fourth beach connected in row after Arnala beach, Navapur beach and Rajodi beach. The beach is clean, not so crowded. This has semi black thick sand.

== How to reach ==
- By train: Nalasopara on Western Railway Route, Far North of Mumbai Suburb in Palghar District. It is approximate 70 Kilometres to beach from Mumbai city which may take anywhere between two and three hours. Need to get down at Nalasopara West (See Railway Map or Station Names) for reference if new to Mumbai. Adjacent to railway station is bus depot and also private auto's available (No Metre System here, Only Fixed amount). From Railway station, beach is at 7 Kilometres and Nirmal Junction is at 6 Kilometres.
- By Road : On National Highway 8 (Mumbai Ahmedabad Highway) get inside Nalasopara towards station (Keep Note of Sign Boards on Highway as one can easily miss it in the way it has been kept). Cross over the East West Flyover and go straight in west. Once inside Nalasopara village, be on Wagholi Nirmal Road. Upon reaching Nirmal market naka go straight towards Kalamb beach.

== See also ==
Juhu Beach
