= Ramdas Ransing =

Indian psychiatrist and medical researcher

Ramdas Ransing is an Indian psychiatrist and researcher Mahatma Gandhi Institute of Medical Sciences, MGIMS best known for his work in Neuropsychiatry. He is a co-founder of the Pasay Foundation, an NGO dedicated to research in the fields of deaddiction and psychiatric work. Dr. Ransing and his team developed the BIND-P model of care, a stepped-care approach aimed at managing perinatal depression in low- and middle-income countries. The model was initially tested in four regions of India and is now being adopted in other countries, including Nepal, Thailand, and Tunisia. Several nations, including India, are considering adopting this model to integrate mental health services within Reproductive and Child Health (RCH) programs and to enhance mental health care in the management of Non-Communicable Diseases (NCDs).

== Awards and honours ==
Ransing has received several awards and prizes:

- The Early Career Travel Award of The International Marcé Society for Perinatal Mental Health at the Marcé Biennial Scientific Conference, Bangalore, India, 2018.
- The Royal Australian and New Zealand College of Psychiatrists Fellowship for Early Intervention in Psychiatry at the World Psychiatric Association Thematic Congress, Melbourne, Australia, 2018.
- The Dr. Anil Kumar Dutt Award- awarded by the Indian Association of Private Psychiatry at its annual national conference, Kolkata, India, 2016.
- The Sushrut Award- award by the Academy of Medical Sciences, 2015.
