= Ghod River =

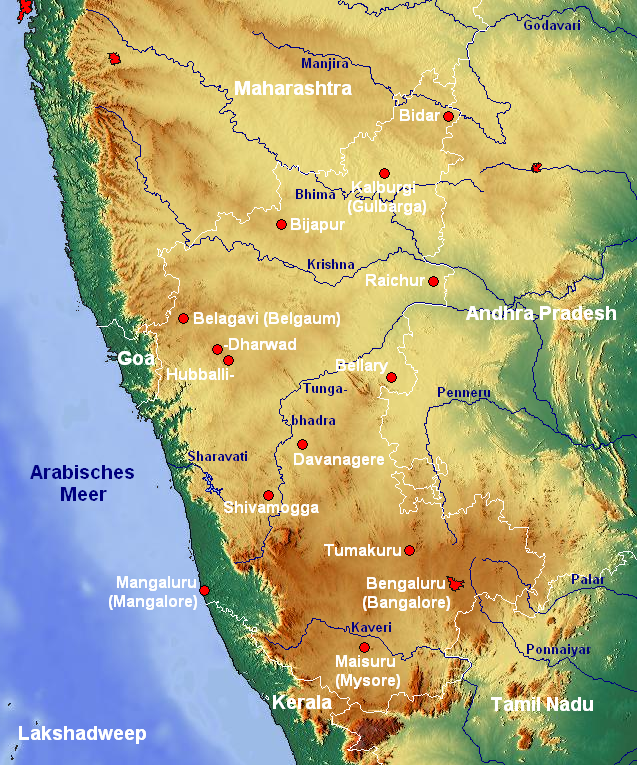
- Bhima river course visible in top half.
- Native name: घोड नदी (Marathi)

Location
- Country: India
- State: Maharashtra

Physical characteristics
- Mouth: Bhima River
- Length: 200 km (120 mi)

Basin features
- Tributaries
  - left: Kukadi River, Mina River

Ghod River is located in Pune District, Maharashtra, western India. It is a tributary of the Bhima River. The Ghod originates on the eastern slopes of the Western Ghats at 1,090 metres (3,580 ft) above sea level. It flows in an east-southeast direction for approximately 200 kilometres (120 mi) before its confluence with the Bhima. It flows from the northern side of the Sahyadri Hills.

The Kukadi River is one of the tributaries of the Ghod. The Ghor River is the tributary of Bhima River. The soil on the upper and lower courses of the river is abundant in paleontological sediments. The river dates back to ancient times, which is proved by the gravel bed. The river Ghod flows in the state of Maharashtra. Inamgaon is one of the largest and most exciting chalcolithic sites in India, which is located on the banks of this river. Inamgaon, a post-Harappan agrarian village located along the Ghod, has been studied for its archaeological finds. The river is dammed by the Ghod Dam.

The Ghod is a major river used by the nearby inhabitants primarily for irrigation purposes.

== Course ==
The River Ghod in Maharashtra flows from the northern side of the Bhimashankar Hills of the Western Ghats, originating at about 1090 meters above sea level. The river is dammed at several places, including the Ghod Dam:

Height of the dam – above lowest foundation is 29.6 m (97 ft)
Length of the dam: 3,300 m (10,800 ft)
Volume Content: 1,020 km^{3} (240 mi^{3})
Storage capacity: 216,300.00 km^{3} (51,893.13 mi^{3}), and the Chinchani Dam which reservoir has a capacity of 5.47 TMC. Ghod travels further and many smaller rivers join it. After it is joined by the Kukadi River at 18°51′20″N 74°18′23″E it is locally known as the Kukadi River until the name changes back to Ghod at the dam at 18°34′30″N 74°33′08″E. The other main tributaries of the river are: the Mula and Mutha rivers. The Mula rises in Mulshi taluka, and the Mutha in Velhe. The Ghot's tributary Meena rises in the Sahyadri Ghats. The Ghod itself is a tributary of the Bhima River, with which it merges at Sangvi Dumala, below Kashti.

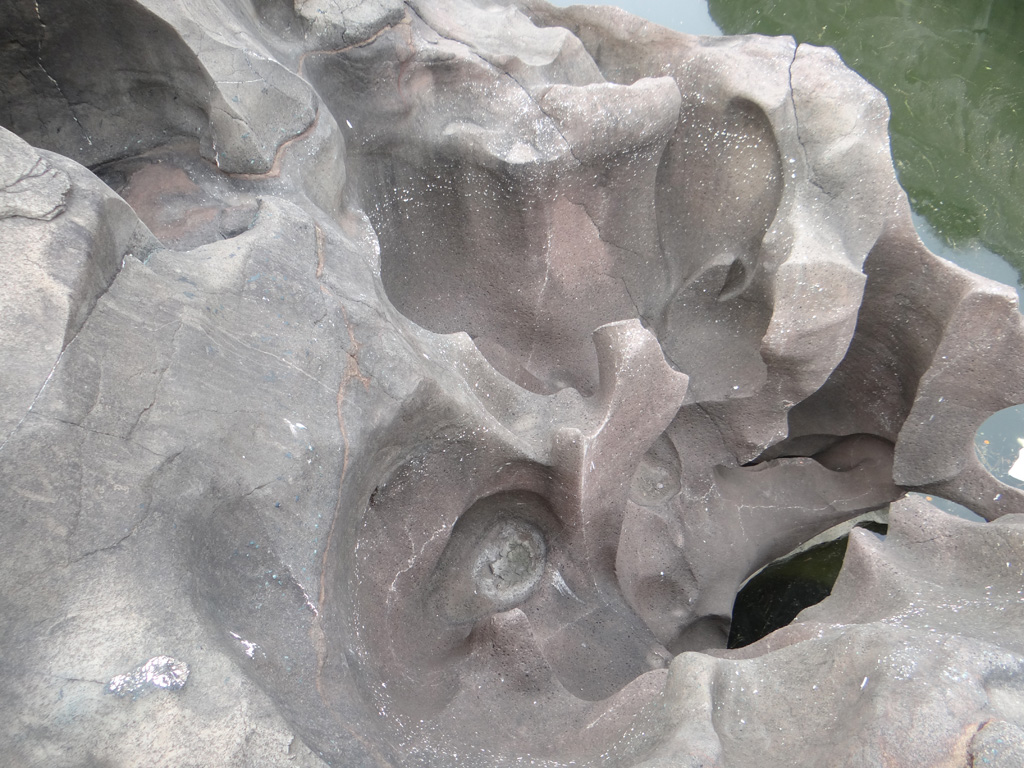
Potholes at Nighoj river

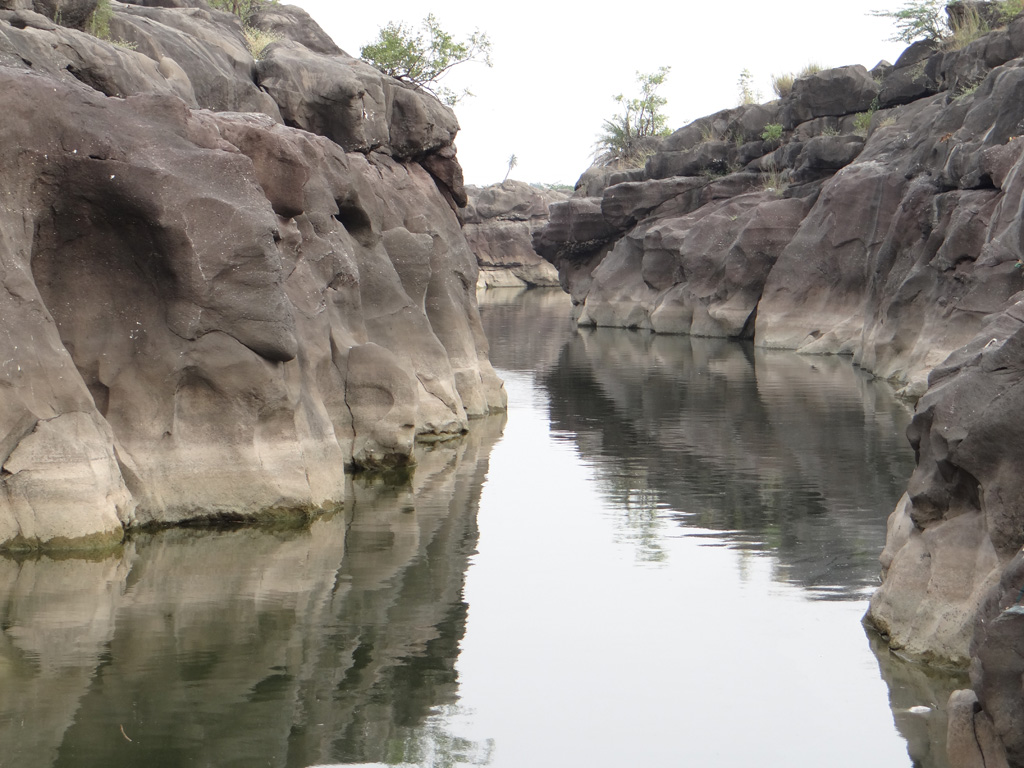
Potholes in Nighoj river
