= Ambegaon =

- town
- Location in Maharashtra, India
- Coordinates: 19°7′0″N 73°44′0″E
- Country: India
- State: Maharashtra
- District: Pune

Languages
  - Official: Marathi
- Time zone: UTC+5:30 (IST)
- Vehicle registration: MH-14
- Website: www.ambegaon.com

Ambegaon is a town in Ambegaon tehsil of Pune district in the Indian state of Maharashtra.
