= Shirur, Maharashtra =

Shirur. Ghodnadi
- City
- Shirur
- Location in Maharashtra, India
- Coordinates: 18.83°N 74.38°E
- Country: India
- State: Maharashtra
- District: Pune

Government
  - Body: Municipal Council
- Elevation: 577 m (1,893 ft)

Population (2011)
  - Total: 385,414
- Demonym: Shirurkar

Languages
  - Official: Marathi
- Time zone: UTC+5:30 (IST)
- PIN: 412210
- Telephone code: 02138
- ISO 3166 code: IN-MH
- Vehicle registration: MH12
- Sex ratio: 52 : 48 ♂/♀
- Literacy Rate: approx. 89%
- Lok Sabha constituency: Shirur
- Vidhan Sabha constituency: Shirur
- Lok Sabha Member: Dr. Amol Kolhe
- Vidhan Sabha Member: Ashok Pawar
- Website: maharashtra.gov.in

Shirur is an administrative subdivision of the Pune district in the Indian state of Maharashtra. It is located on the eastern boundary of the district, on the banks of the Ghod River. The town is also called Ghodnadi to distinguish it from other locations that have the same name. Ghodnadi in Marathi Language means Ghod River.

Shirur taluka's MIDC complex is one of the largest industrial regions on the Asian continent. Geographically, Shirur tehsil starts southeast on the banks of the Bhima River, 24 km (15 mi) on the Pune-Nagar road and ends at 50 km (31 mi) on the same road on the banks of the Ghod River.

== History ==
Notable events and locations in the history of Shirur include

- Samadhi of Sambhaji I constructed at Vadhu Budruk
- Bajirao’s gift to Mastani
- Kendur, Mastani's Palace at Pabal
- Santoba’s Kanhur
- Geologically important Inamgaon
- Netaji Palkar resided in Tandali, and the cultural and holy places Mahaganapati Ranjangaon

== Culture ==
Tamasha artist Gangaram Kavathekar and Lavani poet Bashir Momin Kavathekar are recipients of state government cultural awards like the Vithahbai Narayangaonkar award.

== Transport ==
Public Transit Shirur is situated on Maharashtra State Highway 27. It is connected to Pune through PMPML buses. The city lies on an intersection of highways that connect multiple cities, towns, and villages.

Major highways include

NH 753F - Jalgaon, Pahur, Fardapur, Ajanta, Sillod, Phulambri, Aurangabad, Newasa, Wadala Bahiroba, Ghodegaon, Ahmednagar, Shirur, Ranjangaon, Shikrapur, Pune, Paud, Mulshi, Tamhini, Nijampur, Mangaon, Mhasla, and Dighi Port.

State Highways:

1. MH SH 27: Pune - Shirur - Ahmednagar
2. MH SH 50: Shrigonda - Shirur - Parner - Takli Dhokeshwar - Sakur
3. MH SH 51: Shirur - Nighoj - Alkuti - Belha
4. MH SH 54: Shirur - Bhimashankar - Karjat - Panvel - Uran - Mumbai
5. MH SH 55: Shirur - Shrigonda - Jamkhed
6. MH SH 61: Shirur - Nhavara - Morgaon - Nira - Lonand - Wathar - Satara

The 2nd corridor of the Pune Metro is to be extended from Wagholi / Pune Airport to Shirur. The nearest railway station is Belwandi Station.

The nearest airport is Pune International Airport.

== Demographics ==
Shirur is situated within the Pune district in Maharashtra. In 2011, the population of Shirur taluka was 385,414. Based on population, it ranks 6th in the district and 50th in Maharashtra.

Shirur taluka has a total of 199,585 people employed, 118,181 male and 81,404 female. Shirur has an unemployment rate of 0%. It stands at 4th in the district and 77th in Maharashtra.

Its literacy rate is 82% with 278,001 total literate residents. In terms of literacy, Shirur ranks 7th in the Pune district and 117th in Maharashtra.

== Industries ==
The first corporate sugar factory in Shirur was established on 16 May 1990. Industrial presence was expanded considerably in 1994 through the establishment of the local MIDC complex. The location, infrastructure and faster connectivity to major cities helped create three popular MIDC establishments - Karegaon, Sanaswadi and Ranjangaon. Many manufacturers have set up facilities in Maharashtra, including Apollo Tyres, refrigerator units of Whirlpool and Daewoo, a television and mobile handset plant of LG Electronics, Wheels India, Bajaj Electricals, Frito-Lay of PepsiCo Holdings, Fiat automobiles, Kirloskar, Swarovski, Ohsung, packaged drinking water plant of Aqua Pranali, seating systems factory of Harita and Harita Fehrer. Harita's Srinivasan Services Trust (SST) works in 24-gram panchayats including 147 villages across Shirur on education, health, water, infrastructure, environment, and infrastructure projects. It has benefited 6658 families in the Shirur block.

== Communities ==
=== Shirur Religion Data 2011 ===
Town	Population	Hindu	Muslim	Christian	Sikh	Buddhist	Jain	Others	Not Stated
Shirur	37,111	76.11%	14.08%	0.42%	0.07%	2.95%	6.14%	0.05%	0.17%

The population consists of a mix of Hindus, including castes like Maratha and Mallav Samaj. Other subcastes based on their professions, like "goldsmith", "weaver" and "Maratha Kumbhars" have formed separate colonies bearing their names within Shirur. Other populations include Muslims, Jains (mostly Marvadis) of the Śvetāmbara sub-community, and a few Christians. Marvadis migrated here in the 19th century. During the British Raj, the Chambar Samaj had several horse stables around it, and many Muslims were employed there by the British army. One of the stable areas has now been taken by the Maharashtra State government as a colony for irrigation employees.

== Climate ==
Shirur is influenced by the local steppe climate. There is not much rainfall in Shirur throughout the year. According to Köppen and Geiger, this climate is classified as BSh. Average annual temperature is 25.4 °C and average annual rainfall is 498mm.

The warmest month of the year is May, with an average temperature of 30.8 °C. At 21.1 °C on average, December is the coldest month of the year.

=== Shirur Weather Data ===
	Avg. Temperature (°C)	Avg. Temperature (°F)	Precipitation / Rainfall (mm)
January	21.3	70.3	0
February	23.2	73.8	0
March	26.7	80.1	2
April	29.7	85.5	9
May	30.8	87.4	41
June	28.1	82.6	76
July	25.5	77.9	83
August	25.1	77.2	59
September	25.3	77.5	124
October	25.5	77.9	73
November	22.8	73.0	24
December	21.1	70.0	7

The difference in precipitation between the driest month and the wettest month is 124 mm (4.9 in). The variation in annual temperature is around 9.7 °C.

== Education ==
Shirur has schools that teach in the native Marathi language. The municipal council has a few schools around town, such as Vidyadham Prashala and Rayat Shikshan Sanstha that offer education till the 12th class. There is also an Urdu school in the town since Shirur has a substantial Muslim population. There are English medium schools in town too: the New English School, run by Rayat Shikshan Sanstha, the Rasiklal Dhariwal School, run by Shirur Shikshan Prasarak Mandal, and Jeevan Shikshan Mandir are a few examples. For higher education, there are colleges like the C.T. Bora College of Arts, Science, and Commerce. A sister concern, MDIMRT (Manikchand Dhariwal Institute of Management and Rural Technology), offers degrees like BCS and MCA. Chhatrapati Sambhaji Shikshan Sanstha offers graduate courses in Education and Pharmacy at the Sitabai Thite College. The Kasturi Shikshan Sanstha's College of Pharmacy is located in Shikrapur.

== Tourism ==
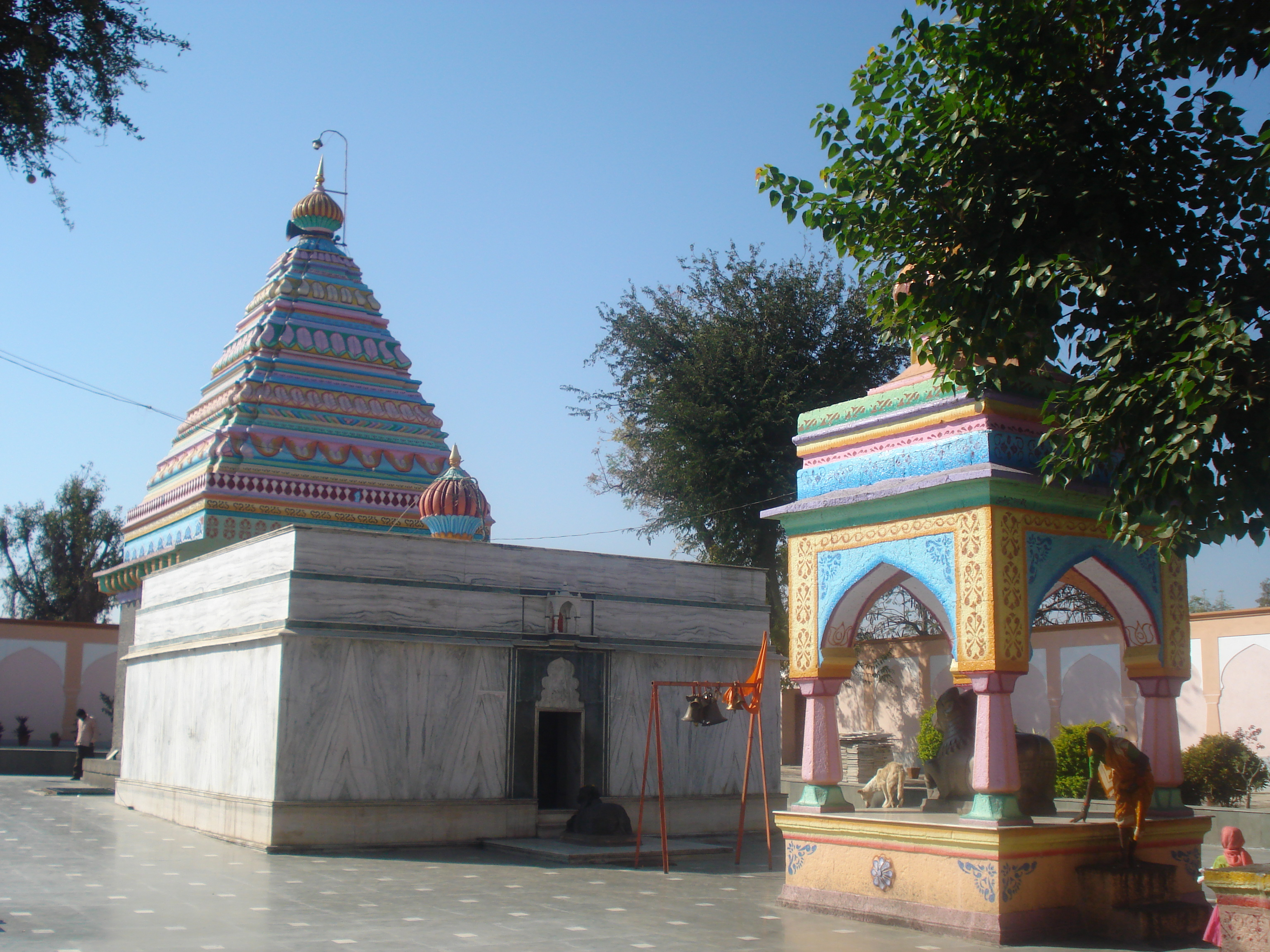

- Vadhu Budruk— samadhi of Chatrapati Sambhaji Maharaj, son of Chatrapati Shivaji Maharaj who was ambushed at Sangameshwar in Ratnagiri district, and killed by the Mughul emperor Aurangjeb at Tulapur.
- Kavathe Yamai - Palace of erstwhile Maratha warrior family of Pawar, now based in Dhar, Yemai Temple, and Fatteshwar Temple located on the bank of Ghod River. Famous Lavani Poet Bashir Momin Kavathekar also hails from the village.
- Malthan - Palace of erstwhile Maratha warrior family of Pawar, based in Dhar.
- Waghale - Samadhis of erstwhile Maratha warrior family of Pawar Dewas.
- Ramling (Old Shirur)—The only North facing Lord Shiva's temple (It is believed that Lord Rama built the Shiva Ling here when he was in exile. Many people gather here for the holy festival of Mahashivratri)
- Ranjangaon on Pune -Nagar road — a temple of the Mahaganapati, one of the Ashtavinayaka
- Nighoj — natural potholes in the River Kukdi

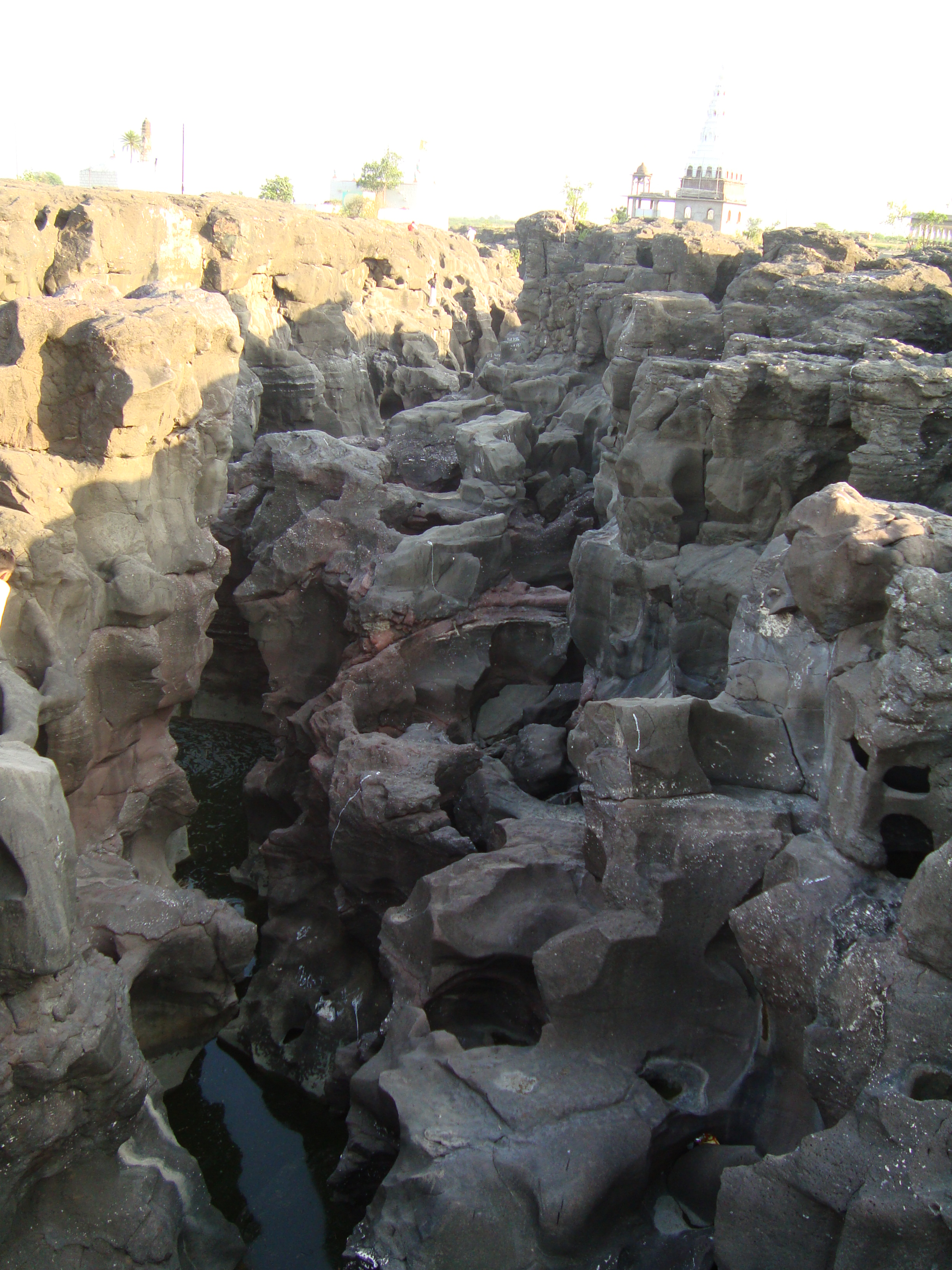
Potholes near Nighoj

- Chincholi Morachi — a peacock sanctuary
- Inamgaon - Archaeological site

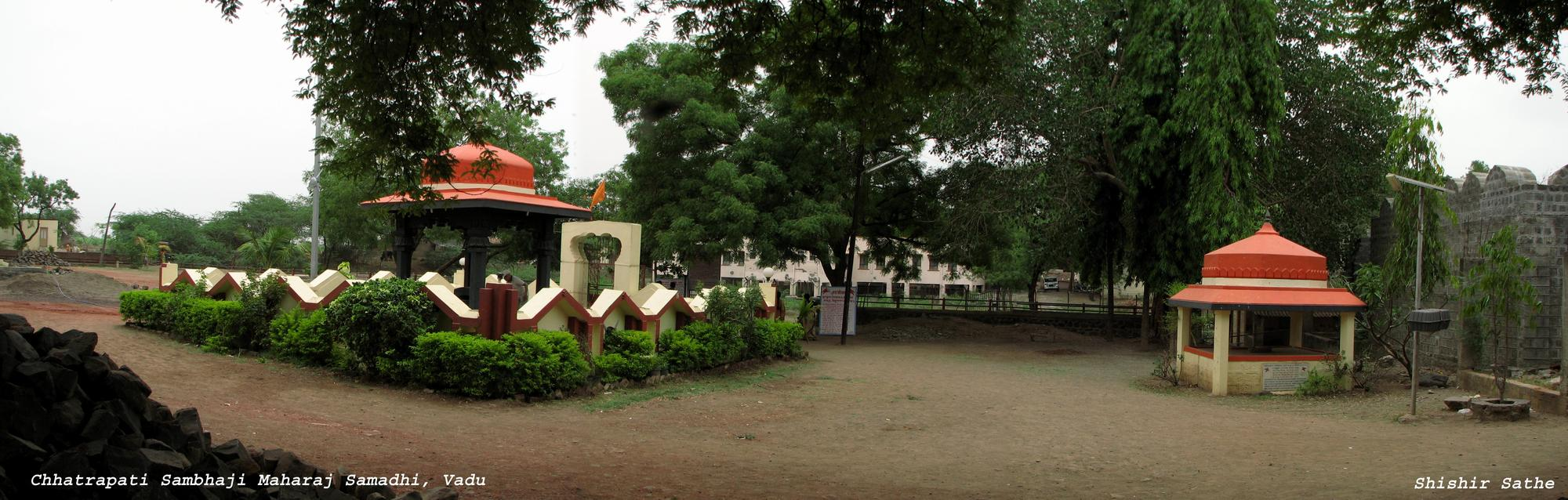
Sambhaji's and Kavi Kalash's Samadhi(Mausoleum) at Vadhu

- Chinchani — a dam on the Ghod River
- Pimple Jagtap — temple of Dharmaraja, eldest of the Pandava, under the trusteeship of the Bendbhar Patil family for the last 300 years
- Nimgaon Mhalungi - temple of Mhasoba, Vidya Vikas Mandir School and Dr. Ramdas Ransing's House
