= Shirur taluka =

- Taluka
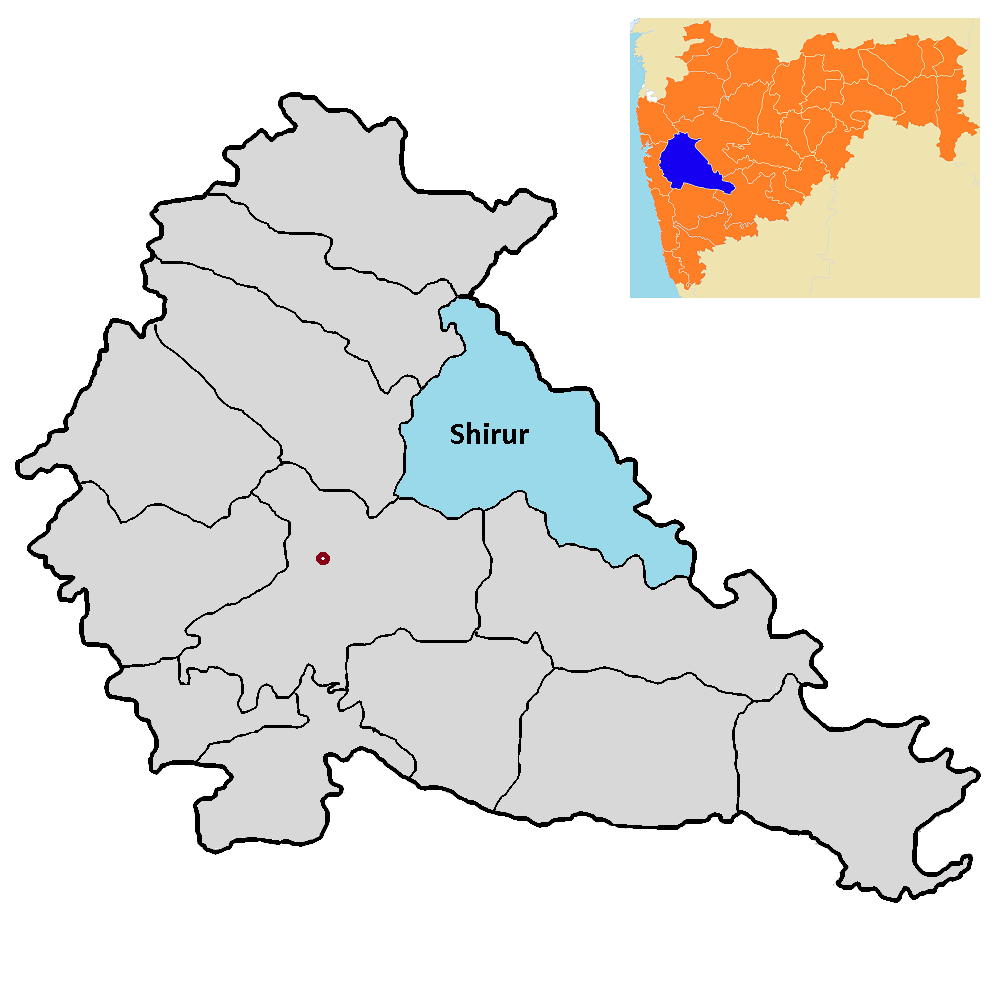
- Location of Shirur in Pune district in Maharashtra
- Country: India
- State: Maharashtra
- District: Pune
- Website: shirur.mytaluka.com

Shirur taluka, is a taluka in Haveli subdivision of Pune district of state of Maharashtra in India. The town is situated on the bank of river Ghod and hence it was also known as Ghodnadi in 20th Century. The town is on the border of Pune & Ahmed Nagar District and hence, main trading center for Shirur Taluka as well as Parner Taluka located in Ahmed Nagar District.

The town has good schools and colleges. The multi-faith population inhibits the town. Three Suger Factories are located in this Taluk. The famous Ranjangaon MIDC is host many multinational manufacturing companies .

== Demographics ==
Religions in Shirur taluk (2011)
Religion	Percent
Hinduism	93.25%
Islam	3.41%
Buddhism	2.01%
Jainism	0.94%
Other or not stated	0.39%

Shirur taluka has a population of 385,414 according to the 2011 census. Shirur had a literacy rate of 82.37% and a sex ratio of 916 females per 1000 males. 47,921 (12.43%) are under 7 years of age. 63,770 (16.55%) lived in urban areas. Scheduled Castes and Scheduled Tribes make up 8.53% and 3.12% of the population respectively.

Languages of Shirur taluk (2011)
1. Marathi (92.4%)
2. Hindi (4.04%)
3. Others (3.55%)

At the time of the 2011 Census of India, 92.41% of the population in the district spoke Marathi and 4.04% Hindi as their first language.

== Villages ==
- Pimpale Khalsa
- Vadgaon Rasai
- Kondhapuri
- Waghale
- Dhamari
- Pabal
- Kendur

== See also ==
- Shirur, Maharashtra
- Talukas in Pune district
- Zilla Parishad Primary School Kardelwadi a renowned school in the taluka.
