= Yamunabai Waikar =

Indian folk artist (1915–2018)

- Born: 31 December 1915
- Died: 15 May 2018 (aged 102)
- Occupation: Folk artist
- Awards: Padma Shri; Sangeet Natak Akademi Award; Maharashtra State Award; Ahilyabai Holkar Award; Nilu Phule Samman; SNA Tagore Ratna Samman; Aditya Vikram Birla Kalasikhara Award; Rasikmani Shrikrishna Pandit Uttung Gunagaurav Award
- Website: Official web site

Yamunabai Waikar (31 December 1915 – 15 May 2018), née Yamunabai Vikram Jawle was an Indian folk artist, known for her expertise in the Marathi folk traditions of Lavani and Tamasha, folk art forms involving music and dance and reported to be one of the leading exponents of the art genres. A recipient of the Sangeet Natak Akademi Award, she was honored by the Government of India, in 2012, with the fourth highest Indian civilian award of Padma Shri.

== Biography ==
At the beginning, we sang the traditional laavnis, but when we realised that people liked to listen to film songs, we added those to our repertoire too, reminiscneces Yamnubai, on her Mumbai street days.

Lavani dancers from sangeet bari genre don't use their full names. They use their initial name and afterwards a name of a encampment as their last, and supplement 'kar' to it, such as Shakuntala Nagarkar, writes Bhushan Korgaonkar, author of Sangeet Bari, a book on Lavani

Yamunabai was born in Nunekalame village near Mahabaleshwar, in Satara district of Maharashtra in a family belonging to the Kolhati community. Her father was reported to be a drunkard and her mother busked and Yamnunabai, being the eldest of the five children, performed street dances with her mother. At the age of 10, she joined a folk art group from where she had her first lessons of Lavani. Later, when her father joined them, the family formed a Tamasha troupe with her father playing the Dholki while Bai and her cousin danced.

Looking for better earnings, the family moved to Mumbai and Yamunabai started performing Lavani and film songs on the streets of Mumbai. Encouraged by the success of her street shows, she did a stage show, which launched her stage career lasting till 1975, when the popularity of cinema and diminishing audience affected the returns. Though Yamunabai tried to revive her career once again forming a new troupe, gathering her nieces, the attempt was not successful. During this period, she is reported to have a completed a low cost housing project for the members of the Kolhati tribe, the tribe where she came from.

Yamunabai has shared the stage with the renowned Kathak guru, Birju Maharaj, who is reported to have appreciated her performance in 1975, staged in Delhi. The performance helped to revive her career once again and she had opportunity to perform in other parts of the country such as Kolkata, Bhopal, Raipur.

Yamunabai died on 15 May 2018, at the age of 102.

== Awards and recognitions ==
Yamunabai Waikar is a recipient of several awards and honours such as the

- Padma Shri in 2012
- Maharashtra State Award in 1990,
- Sangeet Natak Akademi honoured Yamunabai in 1995 with their annual award
- Sahakar Maharshi Shankarrao Mohite-Patil Lavani Kalavant award in 1997.
- Ahilyabai Holkar Award from the Government of Maharashtra in 2000
- Nilu Phule Samman in 2010.
- Life Time Achievement award of Tagore Ratna Samman in 2012.
- Aditya Vikram Birla Kalasikhara Award from the Sangeet Kala Kendra, founded by Aditya Vikram Birla.in 2012
- Rasikmani Shrikrishna Pandit Uttung Gunagaurav Award at the Uttung Anniversary Festival in 2014.

== See also ==
- Lavani
- Tamasha
- Marathi theatre
- Birju Maharaj
