= Surekha Punekar =

Lavani dancer

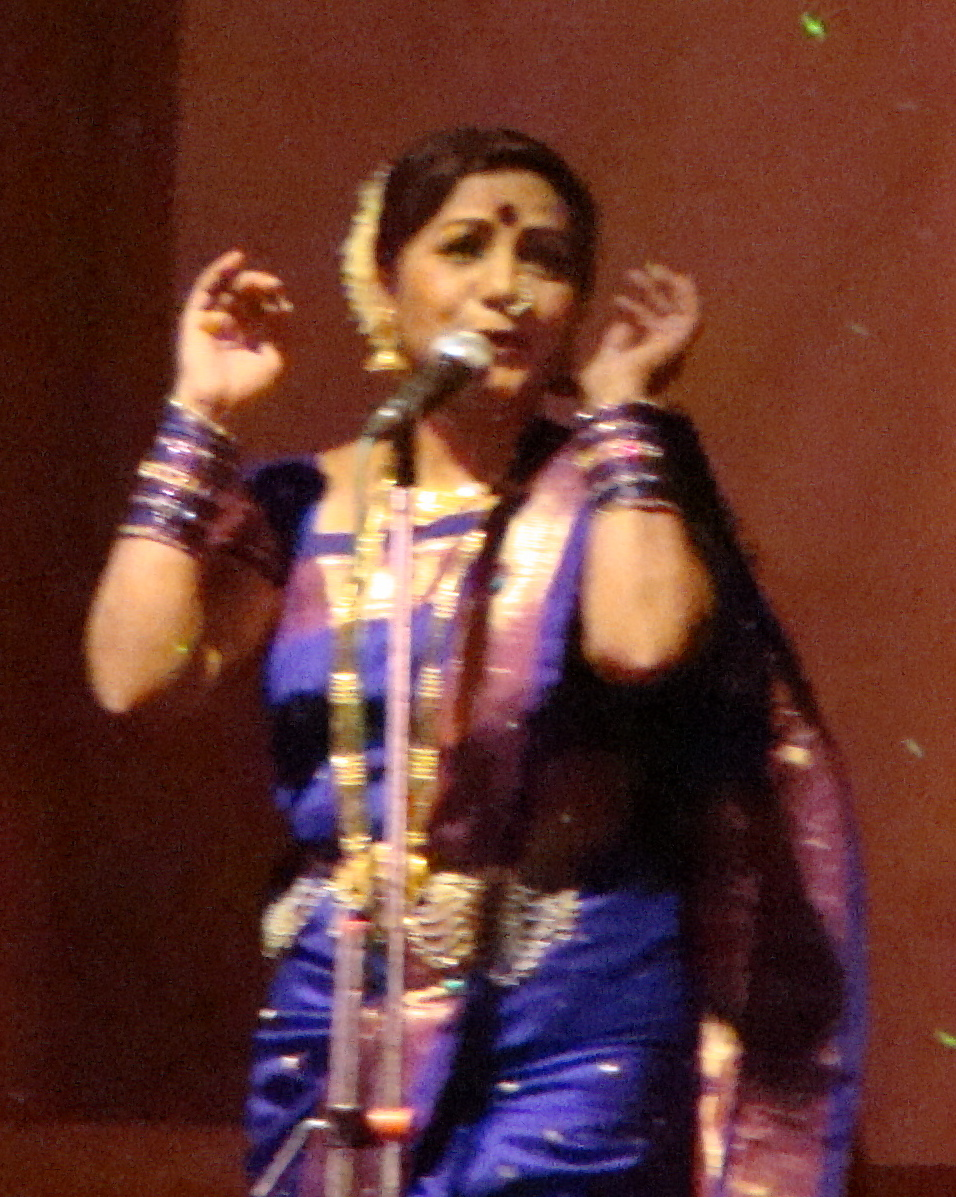
- Punekar during a performance in 2009
- Born: 29 November 1978 (age 47)
- Occupations: Indian Folk Dancer, known for Lavani
- Known for: Lavani performances
- Notable work: Marathi folk dance Lavani
- Political party: Indian National Congress

Surekha Punekar is an Indian actress and folk artist known for her lavani performances.

Punekar came from a financially poor family and worked as a maid to make ends meet. In her initial days as an artist, she performed in the various Tamasha troupes on the lavanis written by the well-known poet Bashir Momin Kavathekar. After performing in various Tamasha troupes, she started her own Tamasha troupe with her sister Lata Punekar with support from Baba Pathan and Momin Kavathekar. This new troupe initially operated from Kavathe Yamai. However, the venture was unprofitable so the troupe closed. She then tried performing stage shows under the banner Natarangi Nar from 1998 onwards. Initially they received a cold response from the audience; she mentions once having performed for an audience of just three people. However, the show eventually became famous, especially after she won first prize in the lavani competition held in Akluj Lavani Mahotsav. Eventually she had the opportunity to perform her lavani show in the USA. In 2011, she debuted as director of the stage show Nashikchi Naar.

During the 2019 Indian general election, there was speculation that she would be a candidate of the Indian National Congress (INC) in the Pune Lok Sabha constituency. She fuelled this speculation in an interview given to Loksatta. However, the seat was contested by Mohan Joshi for the INC.

Since 26 May 2019, she has been a contestant in the reality TV show Bigg Boss Marathi 2.

== Television ==
| Year | Name | Role | Channel | Notes | Ref |
|---|---|---|---|---|---|
| 2019 | Bigg Boss Marathi season 2 | Contestant | Colors Marathi | Evicted on Day 42 | |
| 2022 | Bus Bai Bas | Guest | Zee Marathi | | |
