= Eetha =

Upcoming Indian film by Laxman Utekar

- Theatrical release poster
- Directed by: Laxman Utekar
- Written by: Kshitij Patwardhan; Laxman Utekar
- Produced by: Dinesh Vijan; Laxman Utekar; Karishma Sharma
- Dialogues by: Kshitij Patwardhan
- Starring: Shraddha Kapoor; Randeep Hooda; Mohammed Zeeshan Ayyub; Siddharth Jadhav; Ishtiyak Khan; Anant Joshi
- Cinematography: Akash Agrawal
- Edited by: Manish Pradhan
- Music by: Ajay–Atul
- Production companies: Maddock Films; Kathputli Creations
- Distributed by: PVR Inox Pictures
- Release date: 4 December 2026
- Country: India
- Language: Hindi

Eetha is an upcoming Indian Hindi-language biographical film directed by Laxman Utekar, who also co-produced with Dinesh Vijan and Karishma Sharma under Maddock Films and Kathputli Creations. It stars Shraddha Kapoor in the titular role as the Tamasha and Lavani artist Vithabai Bhau Mang Narayangaonkar, alongside Randeep Hooda, Mohammed Zeeshan Ayyub, Siddharth Jadhav, Ishtiyak Khan and Anant Joshi.

The film is scheduled to release in theatres on 4 December 2026. This film marks the penultimate appearance of Nana Patekar following his death. The film draws inspiration from incidents documented in the Marathi book Tamasha: Vithabaichya Ayushyacha.

== Cast ==
- Shraddha Kapoor as Vithabai Bhau Mang Narayangaonkar
- Randeep Hooda as Merchant
- Mohammed Zeeshan Ayyub
- Siddharth Jadhav
- Ishtiyak Khan
- Anant Joshi
- Akshara Singh
- Nana Patekar
- Ulka Gupta as gajra

== Production ==
=== Filming ===
Principal photography commenced in November 2025 and was completed in May 2026, The film was shot in places across Bhor and Pune.

== Music ==
The film's music is composed by Ajay-Atul and lyrics penned by Amitabh Bhattacharya. The first single titled "Ji Ji Re Ji" was released on 17 November 2026, which is sung by Shreya Ghoshal and Ajay Gogavale.

Track listing
No.	Title	Lyrics	Singers	Length
1.	"Ji Ji Re Ji"	Amitabh Bhattacharya	Shreya Ghoshal, Ajay Gogavale	5:45

== Release ==
Eetha is scheduled to be released on 4 December 2026. Initially, the film's was originally scheduled to release on 28 August 2026, but it was postponed due to avoid clash with Khosla Ka Ghosla 2 and Toxic.

=== Distribution ===
Jio Studios was originally reported to be the Indian distributor for Eetha, but pulled out of a distribution deal in late October 2026. Shortly after, PVR Inox Pictures acquired distribution rights to the film for ₹80–90 crore.
