= Vithabai Bhau Mang Narayangaonkar =

Indian singer and dancer (1935–2002)

- Born: 1 July 1935; Pandharpur, India
- Died: 15 January 2002 (aged 66); Narayangaon, Maharashtra, India
- Occupation: Performing artist
- Spouse: Anna Sawant Merchant
- Children: Mangala Bansode (Daughter)
- Parents: Bhau Bapu Narayangaonkar (father); Shantabai Narayangaonkar (mother)
- Relatives: Narayan Khude (grandfather); Ramabai Narayangaonkar (sister); Kesharbai Narayangaonkar (sister)

Vithabai Bhau Mang Narayangaonkar (July 1935 – 15 January 2002) was an Indian dancer, singer and Tamasha artist.

== Early life and career ==
Vithabai was born in the city of Pandharpur, Solapur district, Maharashtra, and grew up in a family of artists. Bhau-Bapu Mang Narayangaonkar was the family troupe run by her father and uncle. Her grandfather Narayan Khude set up the troupe. He was from Kavathe Yamai, in Shirur taluka of Pune district. Since childhood, she was exposed to various forms of songs, including Lavanya, Gavlan, and Bhedik. As a student she did not fare very well in academics, although she performed exceptionally well on stage, right from a very young age without any formal training.

One notable event of Vithabai's life was when she unexpectedly went into labour on stage during a performance. She went backstage, where she gave birth and proceeded to cut the umbilical cord with a stone, before she went back on stage to continue her performance. The audience was surprised to see her with the absence of a baby bump, and upon enquiry, the show was stopped. The audience praised her for her determination to complete the show, but respectfully asked her to rest. She is recognised as Legend Tamasha artiste of great repute, hailing from the village of Narayangaon in Maharashtra.

She received medals from the President of India in 1957 and 1990 for her art. It is said that despite her fame and the honours she earned, she was uncared for and lived in financial distress. Her hospital bills after her death were met by contribution from donors.

== Awards and recognition ==
She achieved high appreciation and thereby her troupe was honoured with the most prestigious President's award in the Tamasha genre of art. She was called "Tamasha Samradini" (Tamasha Empress) by her fans and also honoured so by the government.

Government of Maharashtra has instituted annual "Vithabai Narayangavkar Lifetime Achievement Award" in her memory in 2006. The award is conferred on those who had extensively contributed to the preservation and propagation of the Tamasha Art. The award is being conferred since 2006 and noted recipients of the awards are Smt. Kantabai Satarkar, Vasant Avsarikar, Smt Sulochana Nalawade, Haribhau Badhe, Mangala Bansode (daughter of Vithabai), Sadhu Patsute, Ankush Khade, Prabha Shivanekar, Bhima Sangavikar, Gangaram Kavathekar, Smt Radhabai Khode Nashikkar, Madhukar Nerale. Lokshahir Bashir Momin Kavathekar has been conferred with this award for year 2017-18, for his lifelong contribution to the folk art, Lavani and to the field of Tamasha.

Ms Gulab Sangamnerkar has been conferred with this award for year 2018–19 for her contribution to the Lavani and to the field of Tamasha. Mr. Aatambar Shirdhonkar (for year 2019–20) and Ms Sandhya Mane (for year 2020–21) has been selected for this award due to their contribution to the field of Tamasha.

== In popular culture ==
Eetha, an upcoming 2026 biopic starring Shraddha Kapoor is based on the life of Vithabai.
