= Silent Ghungroos =

- Directed by: Gauri Warudi
- Written by: Gauri Warudi
- Produced by: Gauri Warudi
- Release date: June 2006
- Running time: 24 minutes
- Country: India
- Language: English

Silent Ghungroos is a 2006 Indian documentary film directed by Gauri Warudi. The film is about Tamasha, the folk musical theatre of Maharashtra, and traces its origins to the Peshwa era. Tamasha has been the source of entertainment and amusement for the rural Marathi audience for more than a century. It was made by a Pune-based journalist turned documentary film maker.

== Production ==
The film was shot in various places in Maharashtra, especially Narayangaon, where Tamasha originated, and two Tamasha festivals were shot there.

Made in digital format, using PD 150, a very basic digital movie camera, the film has English narration and dubbing to allow the movie to be watched by a larger audience. Marathi and Hindi versions have also been made for different audiences.

== Reception ==
Silent Ghungroos won the IDPA-Nautanki.tv Online Award in 2007, for the best documentary film.

== Screenings ==
Silent Ghungroos was screened at several film festivals internationally and domestic, viz

- Koodu Women Director’S Film Festival, Madurai, India
- Golden Gate Film Festival, San Francisco, Usa
- Cape Town Bollywood Film Festival, South Africa.

Also screened at independent events in India: Patrakar Bhavan, Pune, Pu. La Deshpande Film Fest, Pune, Idpa-Nautanki.Tv Online Competition, Itc—Hyderabad and Centre For Films And Drama, Bangalore
