= Karawadi =

- Village
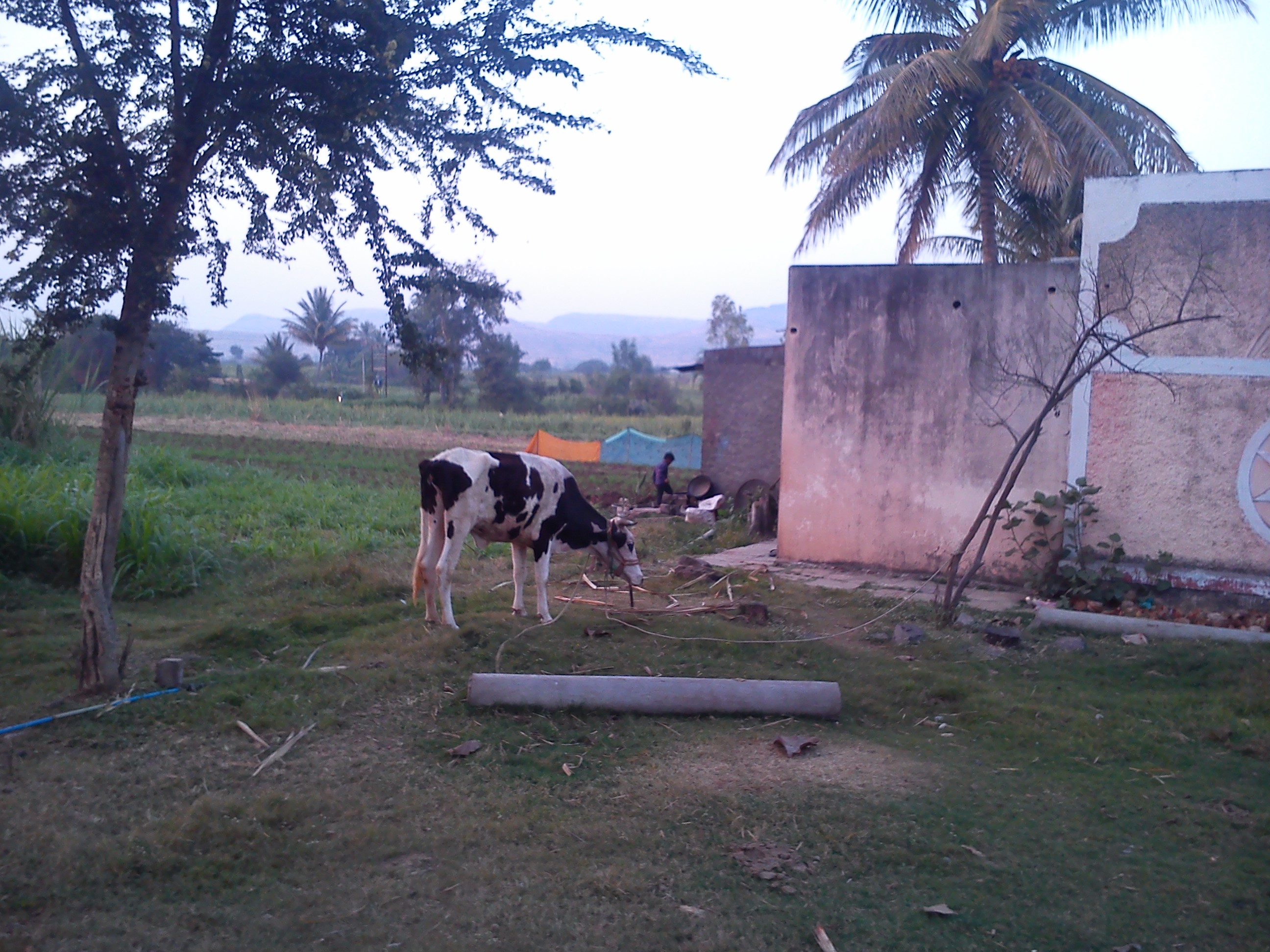

- Location in Maharashtra, India
- Coordinates: 17.33°N 74.2°E
- Country: India
- State: Maharashtra
- District: Satara

Government
  - Body: Gram Panchayat
- Elevation: 566 m (1,857 ft)

Population (2011)
  - Total: 3,588
- Demonym: Karawadikar
- Time zone: UTC+5:30 (IST)
- PIN: 415105
- Telephone code: +91-2164
- Vehicle registration: MH- 50

Karawadi is a village panchayat located in the Karad taluka of Satara district in the southern part of Indian state of Maharashtra. It belongs to Western Maharashtra region. It has a population of 3,588 according to 2011 census. The nearby villages include Ogalewadi, Viravade, Wagheri, Vadoli Nileshwar. Prominent family surnames include Pisal, Dubal, Patil, Chavan, Bhosale, More, Bansode. It is in the Pune Division. It is located 57 km towards South from District headquarters Satara and 278 km from State capital Mumbai.

== Features ==
- Major spots in the village include Aarfal irrigation Project Tunnel, Bus Stand, Janai Temple, Ram Temple and Hanuman Temple.

== Geography ==
Karawadi is located at 17.28°N 74.2°E. It has an average elevation of 592 metres (1856 feet). Karawadi is located near Sadashivgad 17.237506°N 74.15205°E.

== Politics ==
Karawadi Gram Panchayat was formed on 16 January 1953. Pandurang Pisal was the first Sarpanch while Shankar Pisal the first Vice Sarpanch of Karawadi. Karawadi has 4 wards in it. It lies at a distance of 8 km from Karad while 65 km from Satara. Karawadi falls in the Karad North constituency.

- Karad North constituency has a voter list of 274526. Currently Balasaheb Patil from NCP represents this constituency in Maharashtra Vidhan Sabha.

=== Climate ===
Karawadi belongs to the subtropical category of climate characterized by medium to heavy rainfall and moderate temperature. Three main seasons in the region are:

- The Rainy Season (June to Sept)
- The winter season (Oct to Jan)
- The summer Season (Feb to May)

Average maximum temperature is 36 c and Minimum temperature is 11 c. May is the hottest and December is coldest month of the year. The rainfall varies widely in different parts of the village. Climate of Karawadi is temperate. The maximum rainfall is in June to Aug from south-west monsoon. The average rainfall is 540.40 mm in Karawadi.

The dryness is marked in the plains than in the hills. During the south- west monsoons seasons the sky is heavily clouded to over cast. Winds are generally light to moderate receiving during the south-west monsoon season, when they are stronger particularly on hills. Fogs occur occasionally in the valleys in the cold season.

== Offices and institutions ==
The village boasts few government offices and other institutions. Major offices and institutions in Karawadi are as follows:

- Gram Panchayat, Karawadi
- Satara District Central Cooperative Bank, Karawadi
- V.V Cooperative Seva Society, Karawadi
- Post Office, Karawadi
- Talathi Office, Karawadi
- Irrigation Department Maharashtra Housing Quarters, Karawadi
- Primary Clinic, Karawadi
- Veterinary Clinic, Karawadi

== Demographics ==
As of 2011 India census, Karawadi had total population of 3,588. Males constitute 52% of the population and females 48%. Karawadi has an average literacy rate of 84.55%, higher than the national average of 59.5%: male literacy is 90.26%, and female literacy is 78.45%. In Karawadi, 10% of the population is under 6 years of age. People are educated and have medium living standards.

People from different cultures live here but vast majority belong to Hinduism and Speak Marathi language.

=== Occupation ===
Majority of people are involved in farming as occupation. Some people also indulge in milk business as secondary. Major crops grown are sugarcane, ground nut, wheat, soya bean, Turmeric, ginger etc. sugarcane is the major crop which is supplied to Sahyadri Sugar Factory. Water supply is done through bore wells, tube wells and canals.

== Transport ==
=== Railways ===
- Karad – 4 km from city

The nearest railway station is Karad. Karad has railway station and is onroute from Mumbai to Miraj, Sangli, Kolhapur, and Bangalore (some trains). You can reach Karad from Mumbai or Pune easily by road or rail (Mahalaxmi Express, Koyna Express, Sahyadri Express Sharavati Express, Dadar–Puducherry Chalukya Express or Dadar–Tirunelveli Chalukya Express).

Recently, Railway minister Suresh Prabhu has allocated funds for a plan to build a new 112 km railway line between Karad and Chiplun.

Nearest railway junction

- Miraj – 72 km

Having highspeed trains like the Karnataka Sampark Kranti, Deekshaboomi Express, Rani Chenama Express, Haripriya Express and Miraj Hubli Express stop at Miraj Junction. You can take private cars or MSRTC buses from Miraj to Karad. Travel time from Miraj to Karad is approximately 1 hour 15 minutes.

=== Roadways ===
Karawadi is on route the way to Vaduj village in Khatav Taluka of Satara District. State Highway MH SH 78 with route Guhagar - Chiplun - Koyana - Patan - Karad - Vita - Jath - Bijapur(Karnataka) goes from nearby Karawadi.

=== Airport ===
Nearest airport is in Karad. An Airstrip was constructed in the 1955 by the Public Works Department to facilitate the Koyna dam project. It is currently being used for General aviation and pilot training. The airport is spread on 65 acres and the acquisition of more than 100 acres has been proposed. Runway 10/28 is 1280 meters long and 30 meters wide with a 60 meter by 60 meter apron. Neither navigational aids nor night landing facilities are available on the airstrip. The State run Maharashtra Airport Development Company (MADC) plans to extend the 1,250 meters airstrip by another 1,500 m and widen it by 150 m.

== Education ==
Schools

- Zilla Parsihad Primary School, Karawadi
- New English School, Karawadi
- Angel International School, Karawadi

== Schemes ==
- Mahatma Gandhi Rojgar Hami Yojana
- Dalivasti Sudhar Yojana
- Rajmata Jijau Kuposhan Mukta Gram Paryavaran Santulan Karyakram
- Sant Gadagebaba Gram Swachata
- Yashwant Gram Samrudhi Yojana
- Rashtriya Pey Jal Yojana
- Nirmal Bharat Yojana

== Culture ==
=== Mandals ===
- Vitthal Ganesh Mandal, Karawadi
- Mahalaxmi Navaratra and Ganesh Utsav Mandal, Karawadi
- Janai Ganesh and Navaratra Utsav Mandal, Karawadi
- Hanuman Ganesh and Navaratra Utsav Mandal, Karawadi
- Shiv Shakti Ganesh and Navaratra Utsav Mandal, Karawadi
- Samrat Ganesh and Navaratra Utsav Mandal, Karawadi
- Mayur Ganesh and Navaratra Utsav Mandal, Karawadi

=== Folk Dance ===
The famous Tamasha artist Mangala Bansode belongs to Karawadi village. Since, she has retired her son Nitin Kumar Bansode looks after her Tamasha company. It is said that she is the only woman owner of a tamasha troupe in Maharashtra. Her troupe has 150 persons in employment.

=== Historic & Religious areas ===
- Janai Temple
- Hanuman Temple
- Ram Temple
- Balaji Temple
- Vithhal Temple
- Saptashrungi Temple
- Mahalingeshwar Temple

=== Annual Fair ===
After Hanuman Jayanti annual village fair is held usually in the month of May where people worship Goddess Janai and celebrate with Gulal. A Pooja is followed by a Palaki procession. They also hold feasts welcoming friends and relatives from all around.

== Tourism ==
Some tourist points near Karawadi are:

- Mhalingeshwar matha(temple), Karawadi
- Shrikrishna Gopalan Kendra, Karawadi
