= Vithabai Narayangaonkar Lifetime Achievement Award =

Civic award

- Civilian award
- Awarded for: Senior Tamasha (folk) Artist
- Date: 2006 (20 years ago)
- Location: Maharashtra
- Country: India
- Presented by: Government of Maharashtra
- Reward: ₹5 lakh (US$5,300)
- First award: Kantabai Satarkar (2006)
- Final award: Sandhya Ramesh Mane (2020)
- Currently held by: Sandhya Ramesh Mane (2020)

Highlights
- Total awarded: 15 (All Tamasha [Folk] artists)

The Vithabai Narayangaokar lifetime achievement award by the Government of Maharashtra since 2006. is given to a senior Tamasha (folk art) artiste.The honour conveys the money prize of Rs 5 lakh, a citation and a memento.

== Recipients ==
The recipients of the Vithabai Narayangaonkar Lifetime Achievement Award are as follows

#	Year	Name	Ref.
1	2006	Kantabai Satarkar	
2	2007	Vasant Avsarikar	
3	2008	Sulochana Shridhar Nalawade	
4	2009	Haribhau Bade-Nagarkar	
5	2010	Mangala Bansode	
6	2011	Sadhu Pusute	
7	2012	Ankush Sambhaji Khade	
8	2013	Bhima Sangvikar	
9	2014	Gangaram Renke	
10	2015	Radhabai Khode	
11	2016	Gulabbai Sangamnerkar	
12	2017	Madhukar Nerale	
13	2018	Bashir Momin Kavathekar	
14	2019	Atambar Shirdhonkar	
15	2020	Sandhya Ramesh Mane	
16	2021	Hirabai Kamble	
17	2022	Ashok Pethkar	
