= Narayangad =

Fort in Pune district, India

- Pune district, Maharashtra

Site information
- Type: Hill fort
- Owner: Government of India
- Controlled by: Maratha Empire (1714-1818); United Kingdom: East India Company (1818-1857); British Raj (1857-1947); India (1947-)
- Open to the public: Yes
- Condition: Good

Location
- Shown within Maharashtra Narayangad (India)
- Coordinates: 19°16′58″N 74°01′56.2″E
- Height: 2557 Ft.

Site history
- Materials: Stone

Narayangad is a fort in Pune district near to khodad-Gadachiwadi in the Indian state of Maharashtra.

== Location ==
About three miles east of the town Narayangoan on a detached hill which on the north, south, and west rises sharp from the plain is the dismantled fort of Narayangad. Narayangad is a hill fort near Pune, located 80 km from Pune, 8 km from Narayangaon and 5 km from Khodad village. Near Narayangad is a small village named Gadachiwadi. The name of the taluka-Junnar (Shivaneri fort) Narayagoan is derived from the fort. From the base of the fort to the top of the fort is an easy climbing of twenty minutes.

== Places to see ==
Above the fort there are small waterponds named Narayantake, and Chambar Take. At the highest point of the fort there is a temple of the Goddess "Hastamata" and below it there is the temple of "Mukaai". The hill has some other ruins, especially a stone doorway bearing on its lintel a figure of Ganpati and two attendant tigers. The Giant Meterwave Radio Telescope GMRT project, that is located 10 km away has in the recent times popularised the fort amongst trekkers. Built in the North-South direction the fort has its main entrance on the western side.

== History ==
The fort is from the Satvahana era and was used as a watch point for the Junnar Paithan route. The fortress is said to have been rebuilt by the first Peshwa Balaji Vishvanath (1714-1720) and given in saranjam or service-grant to Sayaji Povar. In the last Maratha war of 1818 Narayangad is said to have surrendered to the British in 1818 .

== Gallery ==
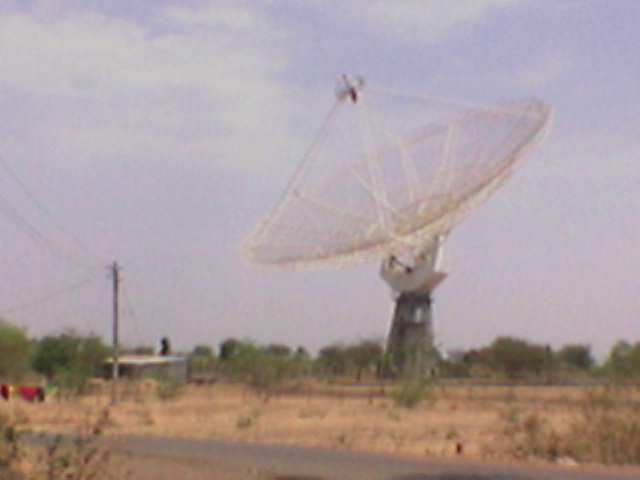
Radio telescope

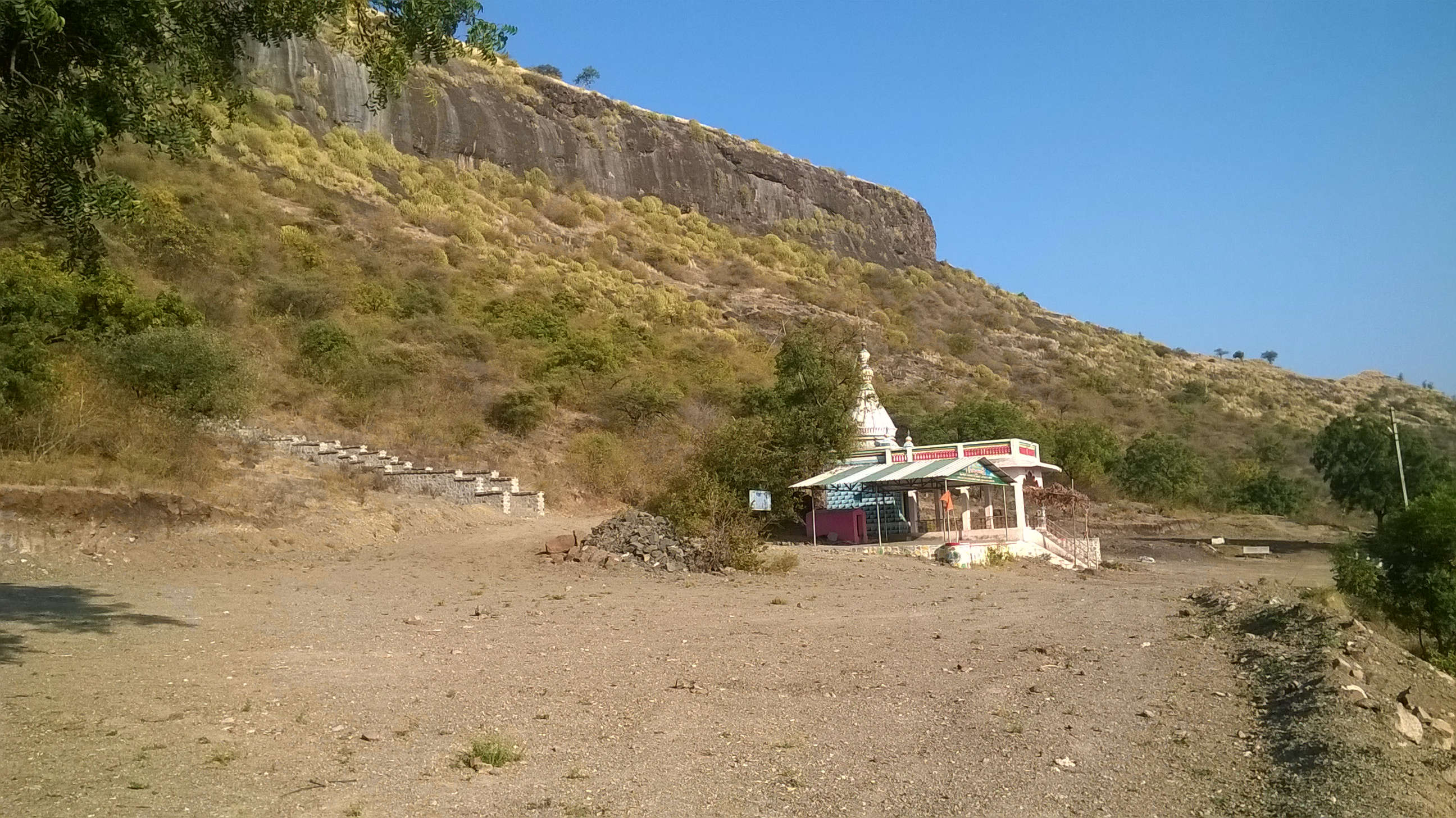
The temple at the base of the fort

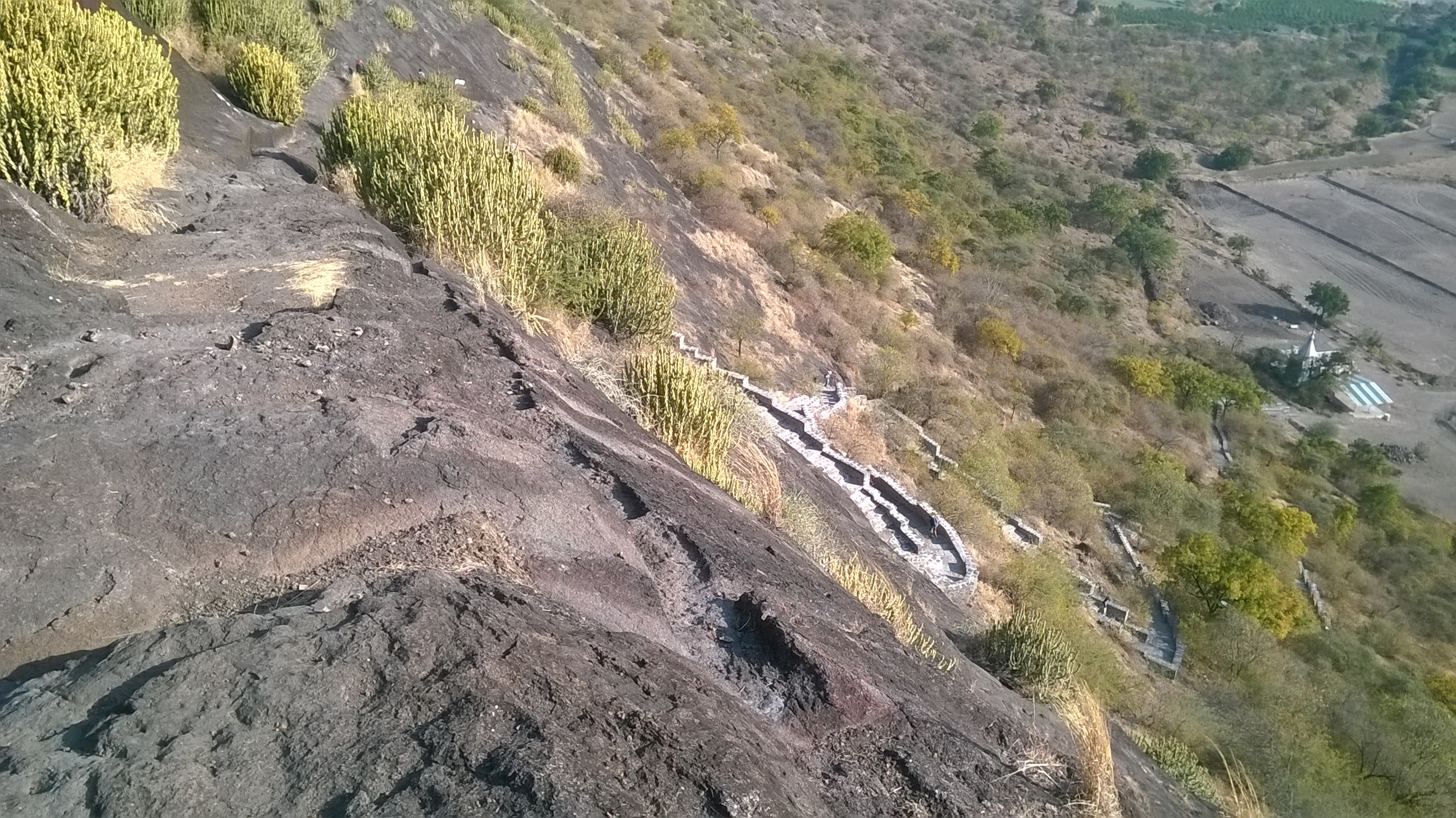
Steps to the fort

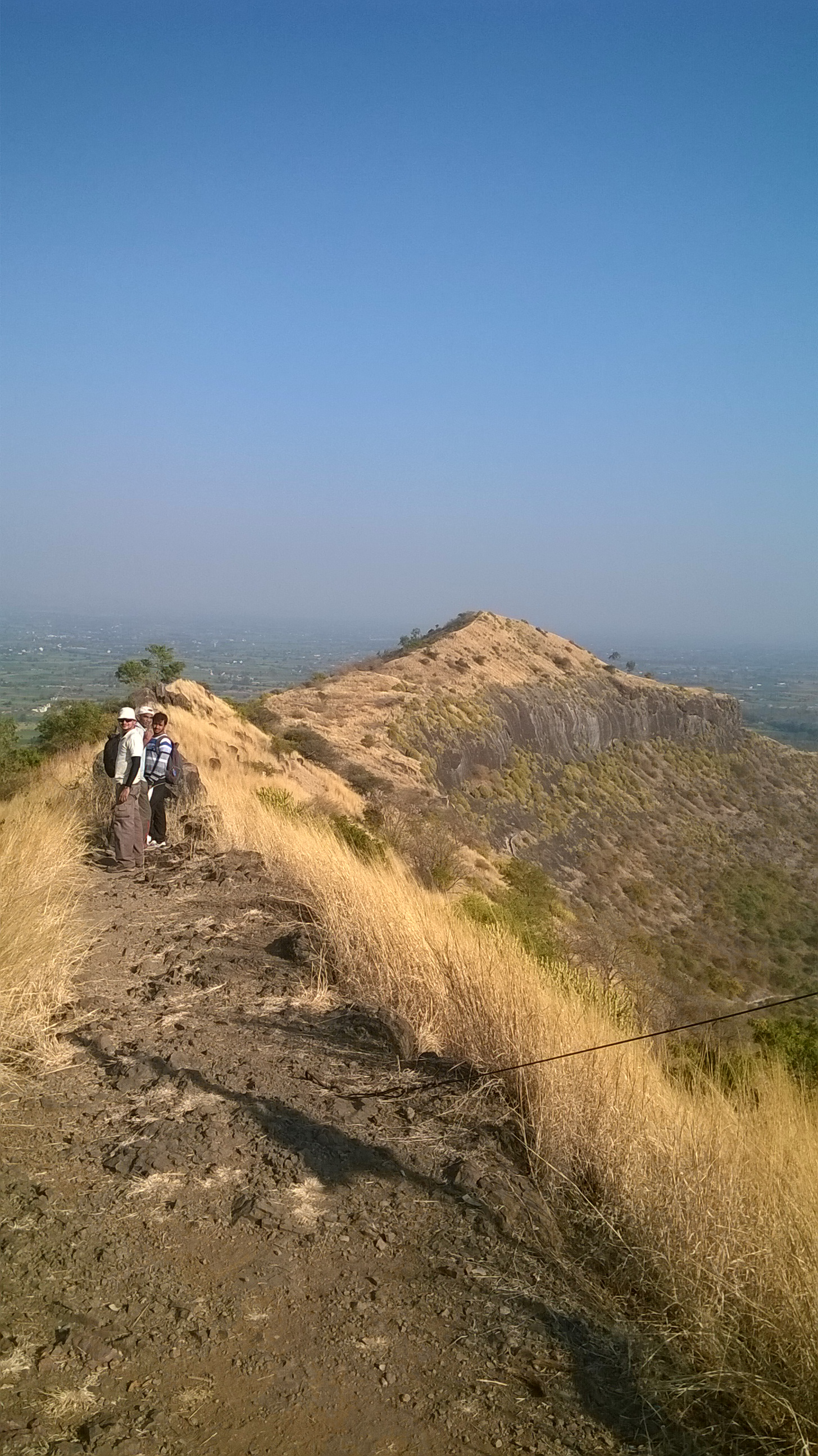
Top of the fort
