= Jaipur Tamasha =

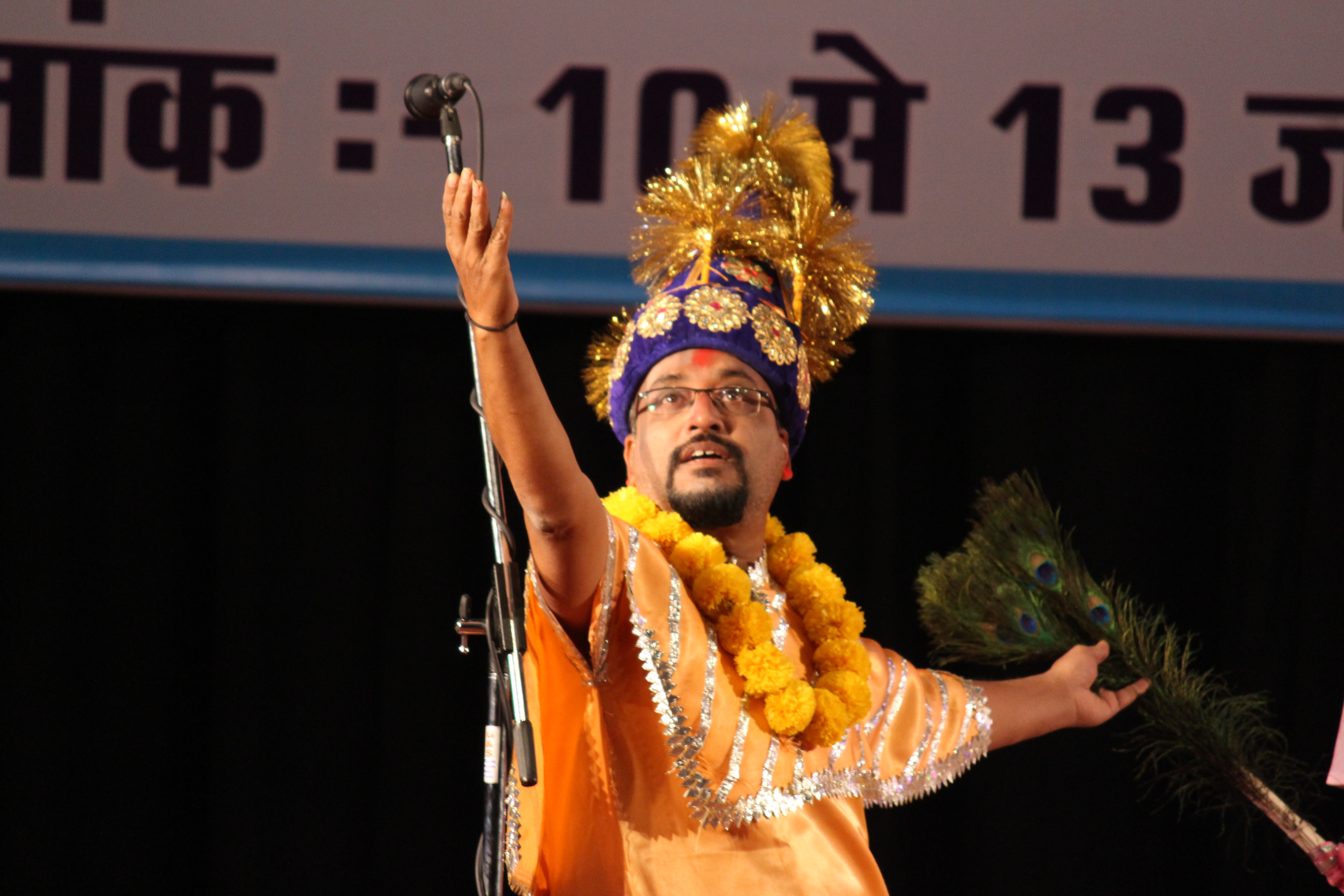
Jaipur Tamasha performance

Jaipur Tamasha is a form of Tamasha musical folk theatre developed in Jaipur, Rajasthan, India in the 19th century.

== History ==
At the start of the 18th century, in the peripherals of Agra, two groups originated and developed a poetic dialogue. The dialogue was later known as ‘Khayal-Tamasha’, during the reign of Aurangzeb. When musicians lost their patronage, they started looking for alternative environments to carry out their art and music. The contemporary emperor of Jaipur, Sawai Jai singh, brought a few artists to Jaipur and settled them in Brahmpuri. The foremost among them was the Bhatt family of Jaipur. Under the proximity of the chief of the family, Shri Banshidhar Bhatt, the Tamasha style developed a specific form.

Tamasha was a musical-based folk dramatic form, which had an explicit composition of music acting and dancing. The Tamasha form with its music comprising classical, semi-classical and folk melody, replete with acting and dancing, is being performed from the last 250 years in the open theatre called ‘Akhara’ at Brahampuri in Jaipur with a unique style of presentation.

== Narrative ==
The foundation of the narrative of Tamasha is solidarity, love and religious co-existence (secularism) as the Sanskrit plays conclude with a 'Bharat Vakya' Tamasha, whose plot concludes with a happy ending, the fulfilling of the wishes of the protagonist, and wishes for the welfare of all. In the Tamasha, the main ragas used are 'Bhupali', 'Sarang', 'Aasawari' (Komal ishbh), "Jonpuri’ ‘Malkauns’ ‘Darbari’ ‘Bihag’ ‘Sindh Kafi’ ‘ Bhairvi’ ‘Kalingda’ and ‘Kedar’ etc. The accompanying instruments are Harmoniyam, Tabla, Sarangi, and Ghugroo.

== Costumes ==
Costumes are very important to the performance of Tamasha. The Tamasha (Crest), "kalangi’ (plume) Gotedar Bhagwavastra (laced saffron garments), a singi and seli (a fish and a neck ornament) to give beats are among the chief costumes of Tamasha. The actors also give an imagined description of the costumes of the performance to which the audience believes similarly the part of the female characters is, and the audience enjoys suspending their disbelief. The creative texts used in tamasha are chiefly ‘Tamasha Gopichand’ ‘ Tamasha Ranjah heer’ ‘Tamasha Jogi Jogan’ ‘Roopchand Gandhi’ ‘ Jutthan Miyan’ ‘Chaila Panihari’, etc. The Jaipur Tamasha has become very famous folk tradition in North India.

Even though the art form has existed for more than 250 years with the core elements remaining the same, it has received some contemporary influence, mainly reflected in storylines, and occasional references to current events, such as recent scandals in politics or developments in sports or technology.

== Gallery ==
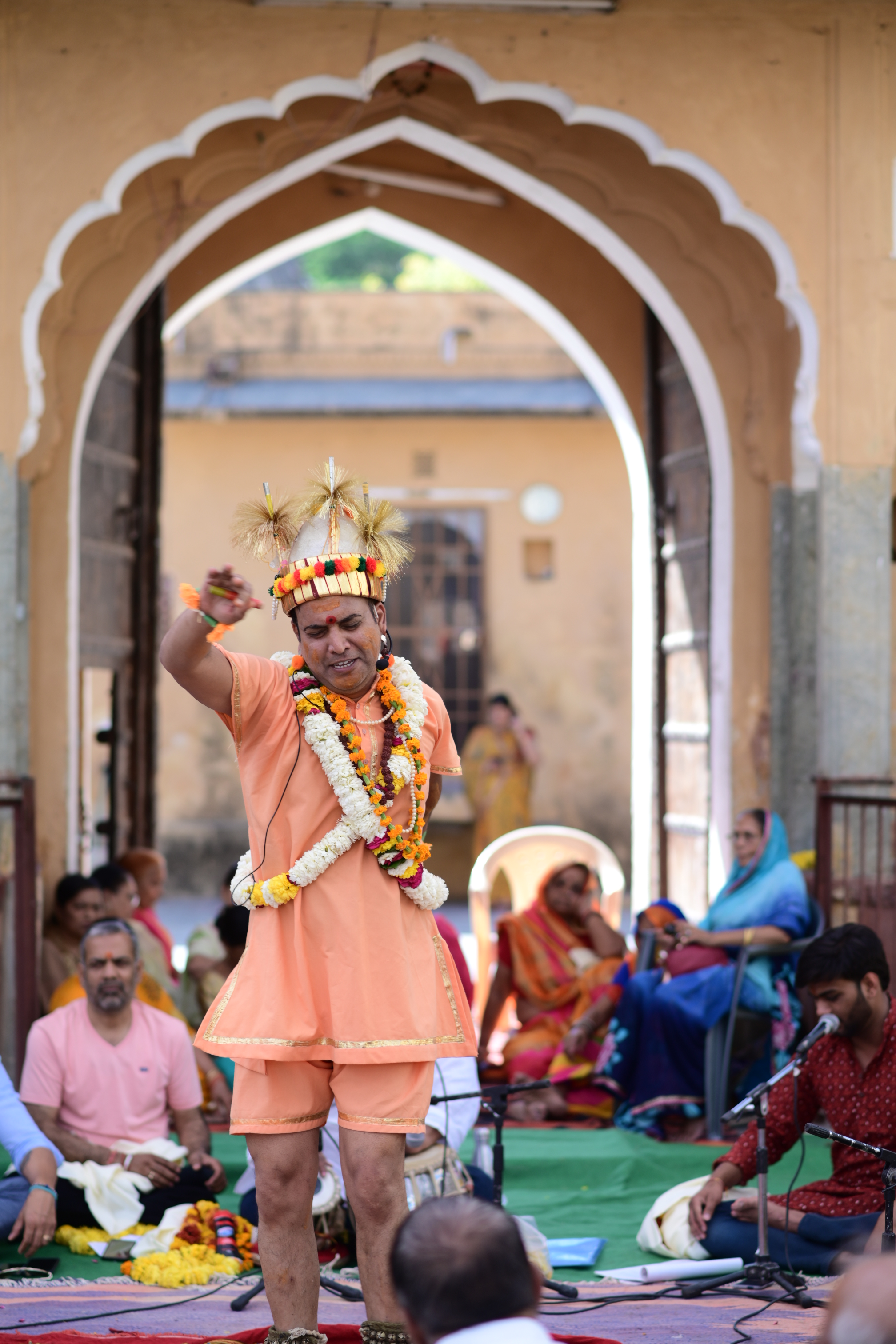
Tamasha performing

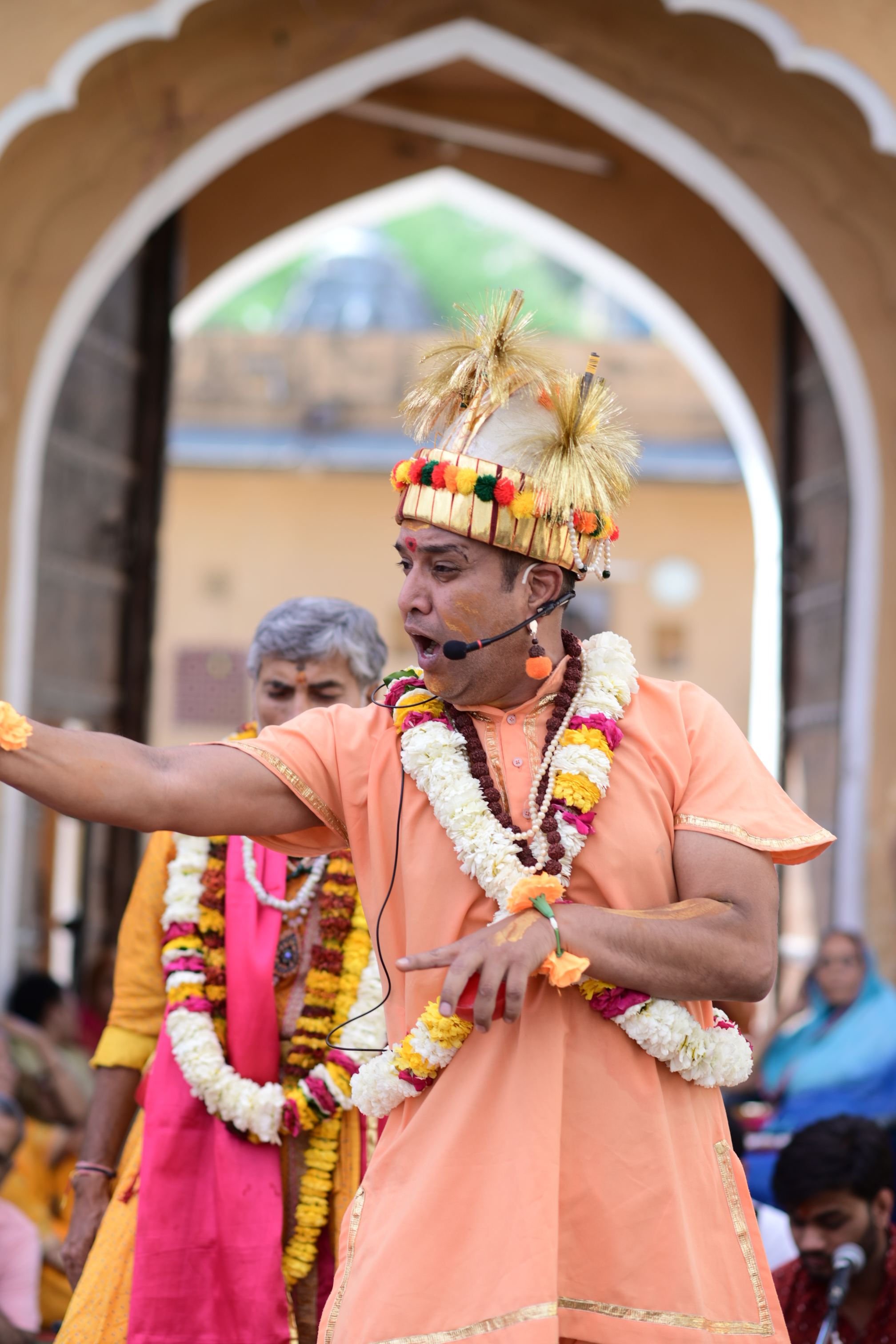
Aalaap

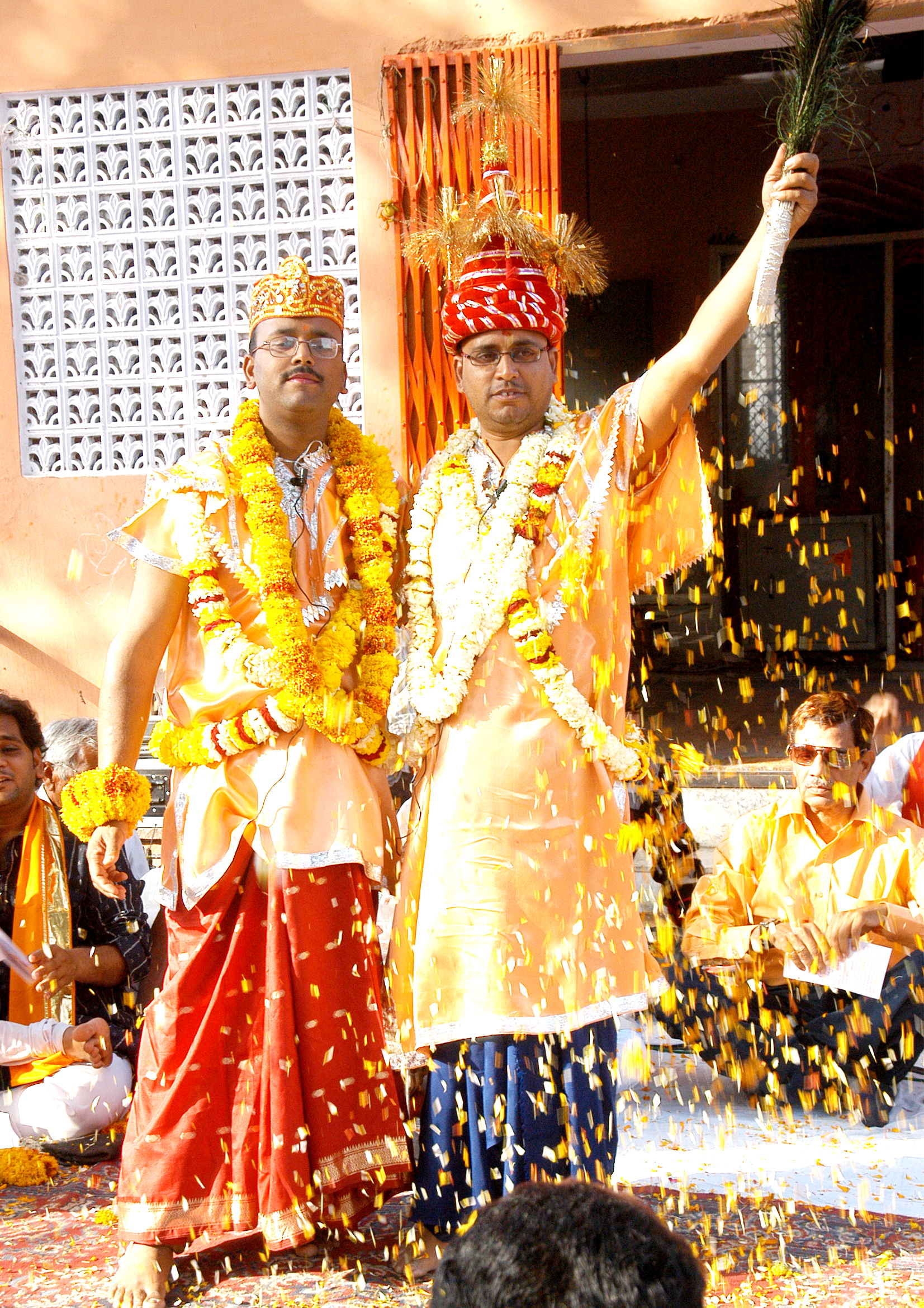
Performance

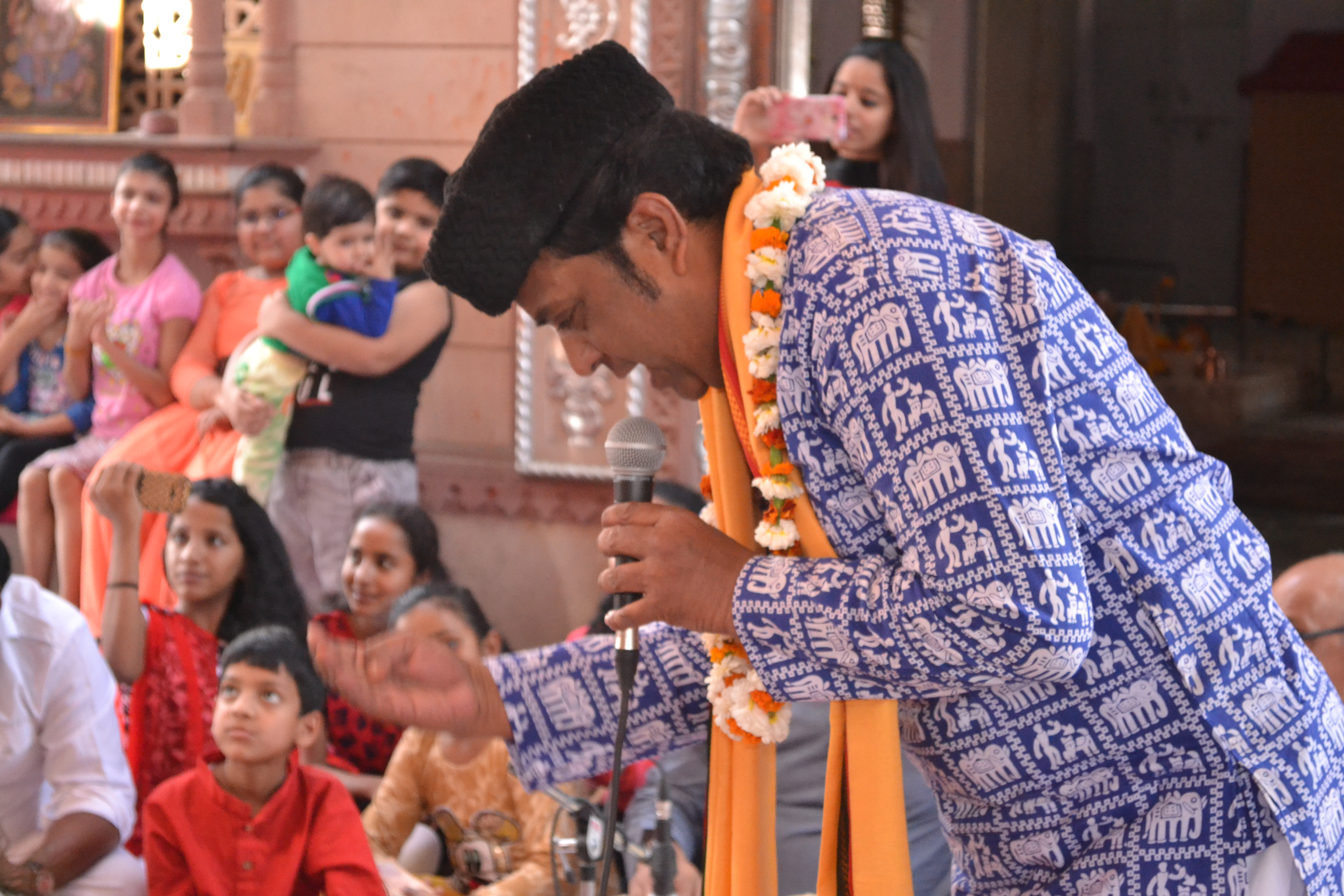
Chitranga - Tamasha Ranjha heer

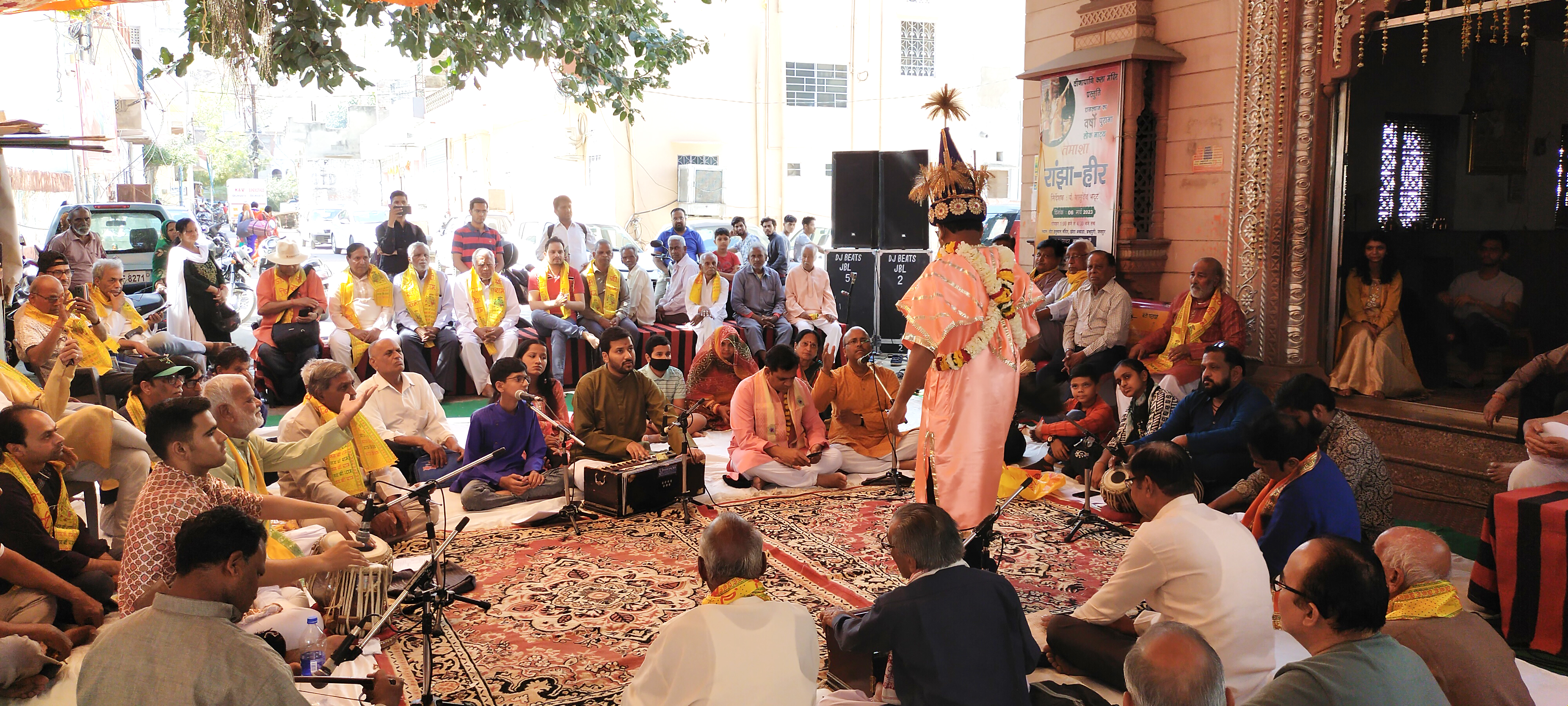
Jaipur Tamasha Presentation Style (Chota Akhada)

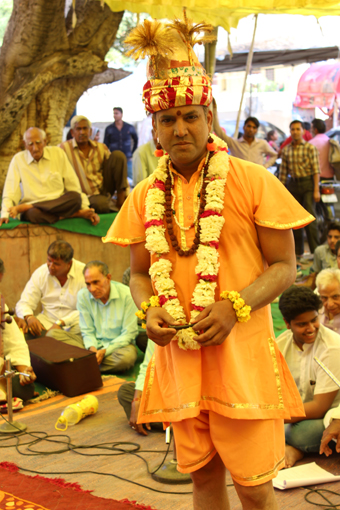
Costume Jaipur Tamasha
