= Narayangaon =

- Town
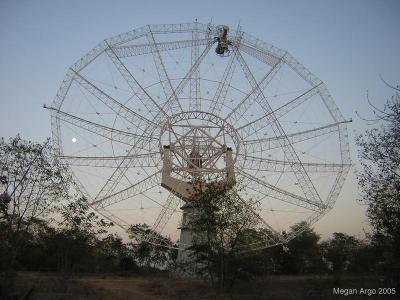
- Giant Metrewave Radio Telescope (GMRT) near Narayangaon

- Location in Maharashtra, India
- Coordinates: 19°07′00″N 73°55′00″E
- Country: India
- State: Maharashtra
- District: Pune
- Taluka: Junnar
  - Rank: warulwadi
- Elevation: 656 m (2,152 ft)

Languages
  - Official: Marathi
- Time zone: UTC+5:30 (IST)
- PIN: 410504
- Telephone code: 91-2132-XXXXXX
- Vehicle registration: MH-14

Narayangaon is a town in the Junnar taluka of the Pune district of Maharashtra state, India. Water is abundant because of its proximity to the major dams, the western ghats, and the Sahyadri mountain range.

== Geography ==
Narayangaon is located 656 m (2,152 ft) above sea level on the western margin of the Deccan plateau. It is situated on the leeward side of the Sahyadri mountain range, which forms a barrier from the Arabian sea. Narayangaon is on the bank of the river Meena. A wide hill range in the south separates the town from the adjoining Ambegaon taluka.

Narayangaon can be reached from major cities via road. It is situated on Pune-Nasik National Highway 50. It is 77 km north of Pune, 132 km south of Nasik and around 176 km east of the state capital, Mumbai.

== Historic importance ==
Shivneri Fort, the birthplace of Chhatrapati Shivaji Maharaj, who founded and ruled the Maratha Kingdom during the 17th century, is 16 km away from Narayangaon. Two of the Ashtavinayak Ganapati, Lenyadri and Ozar, are located nearby. Historical Nane ghat is a place from where trading to the Mumbai market was being done since around 8th century. It is around 35 km west of Narayangaon. Lenyadri, Manmodi, Tulja, Shivneri are the caves in nearby areas which have existed since the Buddhist era. Narayangaon is also famous for maharashtrian folk dance Lavani. All Tamasha Mandals(Teams) starts their new season of performances from Narayangaon. An alternative name for Narayangaon is "Tamasha Pandhari".

== Tourism ==
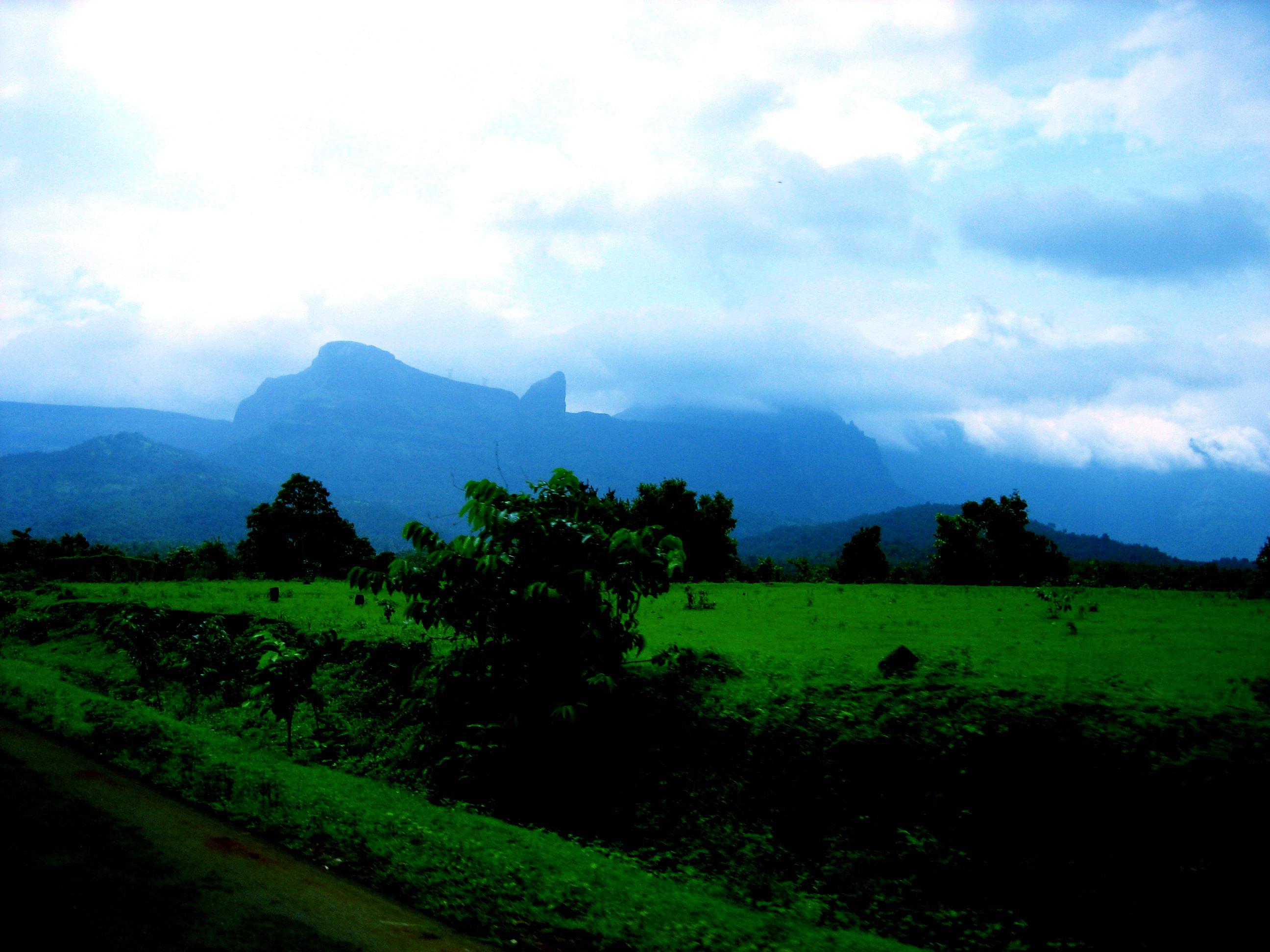
View of Malshej hills

Junnar taluka is noted for the presence of 27 leopards in a 500sq m area. The leopard rehabilitation center in Manikdoh, around 25 km west of Narayangaon, is becoming a tourist attraction ever since its establishment. Malshej Ghat, a tourist destination in the western ghats, is a 45-minute drive away.

A number of commercials and films have used Narayangaon as a backdrop. Visitors explore the architectures of medieval periods such as Adilshahi in nearby places. Caves, dams in nearby areas can also be explored by tourists.

=== Forts ===
Chatrapati Shivaji Maharaj was born at Shivneri Fort, 16 km west of Narayangaon. Shivneri fort is one of the most noted historic places in Maharashtra (India).

The Narayangad fort is about 8 km north-east of Narayangaon, and is believed to be the origin of the town's name.

Ganpirbaba, Chawand, Nimgiri, Dhakoba, Hadsar, Jivdhan, Harishchandragad are other important forts nearby, some of which have become great attractions for trekking. Nature lovers can visit these forts for the natural environment and the rare species of plants found nearby.

=== Temples ===
Goddess 'Muktabai' (Muktaai) (मुक्ताबाई\मुक्ताई) is the Gram-Daivat (root deity) of Narayangaon. Muktabai Temple is situated on the bank of Meena river. It has recently undergone major renovation.

The yatra of Goddess Muktaai starts after the day of 'Varuthini, Ekadashi. This is one of the biggest yatra in Maharashtra state. People come from different parts of the state to enjoy this festival.

Lord Ram temple was established in the era of Peshwas. It is situated at the centre of town. The temple was given to the Brahman Sangh in the 1990s. It was later renovated. The festival of Ramnavami is celebrated every year in the temple.

Hanuman temple is one of the oldest in town.

Shambhu Mahadev temple is a branch of Shikhar Shingnapur Mahadev temple. The khandoba temple near Abhinandan Collection is believed to be Thaan of Naldurga Khandoba situated at Naldurga in Osmanabad district.

Two of the Ashtavinayak Ganapatis are located nearby:

- Shri Girijatmaka of Lenyadri, situated nearly 17 km to the northwest
- Vigneshwara Temple, Ozar, situated nearly 9 km to the north. VIP facilities are available for tourists coming to this and nearby places. New Bhaktabhavan was built having air conditioned suites in all lodging facilities.

Also a Lord Shiva temple named 'Kapardikeshwar' is in Otur, 15 km north to the Narayangaon. Lord Khandoba temple is situated near Wadaj, 12 km west from the town.

== Farming ==
As the town is surrounded by dams and the western ghats, and Sahyadri mountain range is in its proximity, water is abundant in Narayangaon and surrounding places. Farming is a major income source here, and mainly includes vegetables and sugar canes. In the last few years, farmers here are also trying for other sources of income. Narayangaon has emerged as a major export place of table grapes. Grapes from here are exported mainly to the Middle East and Europe.

=== Tomato market ===
At the Narayangaon market, the trader or his representative comes to the farmer and quotes a price. No middlemen involved and the deal is struck. The farmer gets his money right on the spot.

The turnover of the tomato market has increased from Rs 3 crore in 2004 to more than Rs 150 crore in 2013. 600–700 farmer groups of 20 people who work on supply of tomatoes to Pune, Ahmednagar, Thane and Raigad. Around 200 truckloads of tomatoes also go to the North every day. Due to its specific climatic conditions, Narayangaon supplies more than 60% of tomatoes consumed in the country during the four months of the rainy season.

=== Proximity to dams ===
Narayangaon is close to the five major dams. The nearest is Yedgaon Dam on the Kukadi river, about 9 km to the north. Wadaj Dam on the river Meena is 16 km to the west. Pimpalgaon Joge Dam on Pushpavati is 30 km to the northwest, and Manikdoh Dam on the river Kukadi, is 25 km to the northwest. Chilewadi Dam on the river Mandvi, is 25 km to the north.

== Science ==
The Giant Metrewave Radio Telescope is located 9 km to the east. It is the world's largest array of radio telescopes at metre wavelengths. It is operated by the National Centre for Radio Astrophysics, a part of the Tata Institute of Fundamental Research, Mumbai.

VSNL's (Videsh Sanchar Nigam Ltd.) major project is located at Arvi, 5 km away from the town.

== Narayangaon yatraotsav ==
Narayangaon is considered to be the center for the performing folk art tamasha. Narayangaon yatraotsav (Narayangaon fair) is the largest trade fair dedicated to it. Troupes from all over Maharashtra congregate to the fare during which performances are booked by patrons by payment of advances. Sant Sahadubaba Bhau Waykar, famously known as Chakankar Baba hails from Narayangaon's Gunjalwadi.

== Famous Narayangaon People's ==
Amol Kolhe
Vithabai Bhau Mang Narayangaonkar
Mangala Bansode
Shri Guruvary Rajaram Parshuram Sabnis
