= Bashir Momin Kavathekar =

Indian poet and playwright (1947–2021)

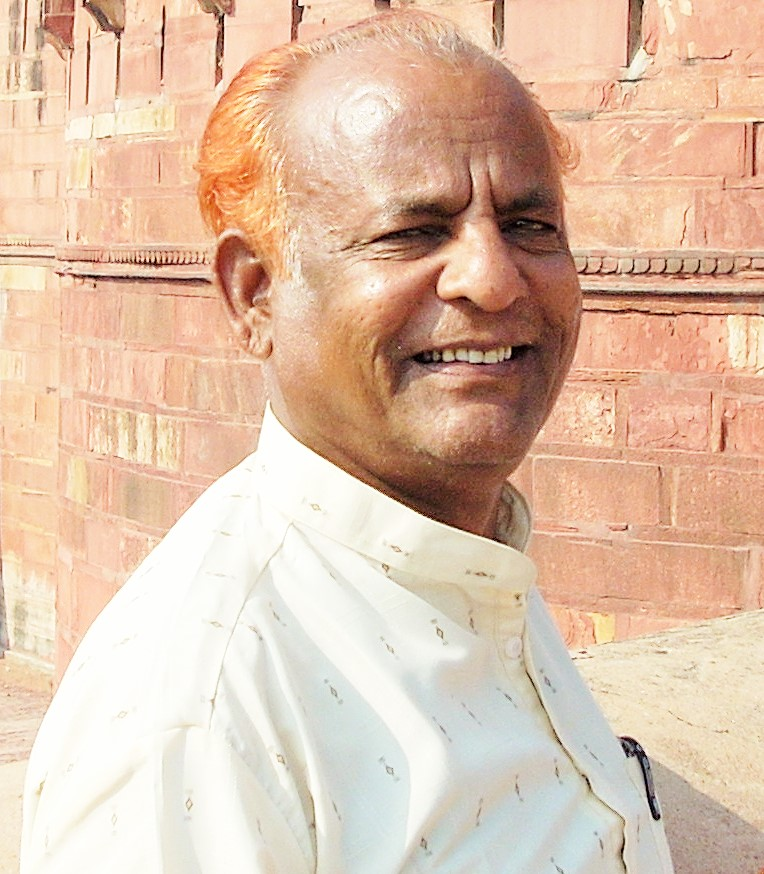
- Born: Bashir Kamruddin Momin; 1 March 1948; Kavathe Yamai, Maharashtra, India
- Died: 12 December 2021 (aged 74); Pune, Maharashtra, India
- Other names: Momin Kavathekar, B.K.Momin
- Occupations: Poet, Playwright, Actor
- Years active: 1960-2010
- Awards: Vithabai Narayangavkar Jeevan Gaurav Puraskar

Bashir Kamruddin Momin (1 March 1947 – 12 November 2021), also known as Bashir Momin Kavathekar and popularly known by his pen name Momin Kavathekar, also known as Lokshahir B. K. Momin Kavathekar, was a popular Marathi language poet and writer who promoted sanitation, literacy, and social reforms through his literatures. His work involved raising public awareness to tackle issues like dowry system, female foeticide, alcohol addiction and blind following of superstitions. Many of his devotional songs (bhaktigit / aarati) adore the Hindu God & Goddess. He was closely associated with Maharashtra's traditional form of theatre Tamasha for almost 50 years; supporting the various Tamasha troupes by providing them with folk songs like 'Lavani', 'Gan Gavalan', 'Bhedic' and short plays called 'Vaga-Natya'. For his contribution to the field of folk art, literature and culture, he was awarded the 'Vithabai Narayangaonkar Lifetime Achievement Award' by the Government of Maharashtra in 2018.

== Biography ==
=== Early life ===
Momin Kavathekar (बशीर कमरुद्दीन मोमीन / लोकशाहीर मोमीन कवठेकर) was born on 1-March-1948 at Kavathe, a small village in drought prone western Maharashtra, into a Muslim weaver family. Addition of Kavathekar to the surname and adopting it as part of pen name indicates the proud association of family with the village where the ancestors has lived for centuries. Due to patronage by Maratha Empire since the late 18th century, the village had been thriving in the crafts and performing arts; and became home to many artist associated with ‘Jagaran Gondhal’, ‘Bharud’, ‘Tamasha’ [all local folk arts]. Momin Kavathekar's fascination in these artists developed gradually as a child because he grew up watching them perform at village functions, during their rehearsals prior to the stage- shows.

=== Education ===
Momin Kawathekar completed his education from a Marathi Medium school. Due to non-availability of the higher secondary school in the village, all the students had to trek 10 km to a nearby village called ‘Loni-Dhamani’. Due to health issues, he gave up the school after completing the 8th standard and started helping his family in the business.

=== Professional life ===
Momin Kavthekar wrote his first song at the age of 11 years. Audience applauded when he performed this song at his school function. This inspired him to continue & explore his writing skills. At young age, he joined the Tamasha troupe of ‘Gangaram Kavathekar’ where he got exposure to the expectations of the rural audience, their preferences for entertainment and the difficulties faced by artist/troupes/operators. He acted in short plays (Vag Natya) and drama. He had the honor of playing roles of Chatrapati Shivaji Maharaj in the drama "Vedat Marathe Veer Daudale Saat" & "Netaji Palakar", as well the role of rival Mughal Emperor Aurangzeb in "Bhangale Swapna Maharashtra"; which were performed by 'Natya Zankar Group' at Bharat Natya Mandir, Pune during the 1970s. He made his debut as Director in 1981 by directing a historical play, "Pratapgadachi Zunj". During free time, he used to pen down couplets/ short folk songs/ Lavani etc. which were performed on the Tamasha shows. However, his folk songs & short plays received huge appreciation from audience and his work become popular amongst the rural areas. Popularity of his songs earned him fame and various Tamasha troupes/operators started flocking down to Kavathe (his hometown), to obtain new songs/ Vag Natya. He got associated with the other Tamasha troupes such as ‘Kalu-Balu Kavalapurkar’, ‘Raghuveer Khedkar & Kantabai Satarkar’, ‘Aman Tambe’, ‘Lakshman Takalikar’ and ‘Datta Mahadik Punekar’ who regularly used Moin's folk songs and VagNatya. Tamasha troupes anchored by Lawani performers such as 'Sandhya Mane', 'Mangla Bansode', 'Lata - Surekha Punekar' etc. preferred to use the Lawani's written by Momin Kavathekar in their performance. However, he never charged any royalty/ fees from these Tamasha operators for the songs/lyrics or Vag Natya he used to provide them. Short plays written with intention to spread mass awareness about AIDS or combating the prevailing social evils like dowry, illiteracy etc. earned the affection of masses. With the advent of Television/ Radio/VCR/ Cable, the Tamasha as ventures started to face difficulty due to dwindling earnings. During this phase, he worked on digitalization options and came up with couple of Musical Audio Albums (CDs). He also guided many troupes/owners to adapt the new technological changes for marketing purpose. He has also written songs for the Marathi Movie 'VIP Gadhav' which features noted comedian Bhau Kadam aka Bhalchandra Kadam as lead actor & upcoming movie 'Bhaucha Dhakka'.

=== Death ===
Momin Kawthekar died in Pune on November 12, 2021, after a career in literature and journalism that spanned for five decades.

== Works ==
B. K. Momin (Kavathekar) has written more than 4000 folk songs which were /are being performed by local artist over the years. He wrote a wide range of songs like ‘Lavani’, ‘Gan’, ‘Gavlan’, ‘Poems’, ‘Devotional Songs’ and ‘Songs on social issues/ reforms’. His folk songs and Lavani's helped Maharashtra folk art 'Tamasha' to sustain its popularity for over half century. His use of folkloric narrative styles has helped in popularizing and making his work understandable & accessible to common man & communities. He has written plays based on historical figures and events. He has written short stories, street plays, songs on the social subjects like ‘Praudh Saksharta Abhiyan – National Literacy Mission Programme’, ‘Gram Swachchta Abhiyan & Swatch Bharat Abhiyan – Sanitation & Cleanliness Drive by Govt’, ‘awareness about AIDS’, ‘ill effect of dowry’, 'female feticide', 'alcohol addiction' etc. and presented/performed them across rural Maharashtra.

=== Drama ===
- “भंगले स्वप्न महाराष्ट्रा (Bhangale Swapn Maharashtra)”--- Play based on the events during reign of Maratha warrior-king Rajaram against the Mughal empire
- “वेडात मराठे वीर दौडले सात (Vedat Marathe Veer Daudale Saat)” –-- Play based on Maratha general Shri Pratparao Gujjar lead battle at Nesari.
- “लंका कुणी जाळली (Lanka Kuni Jalali)”

=== Street Plays on social issues ===
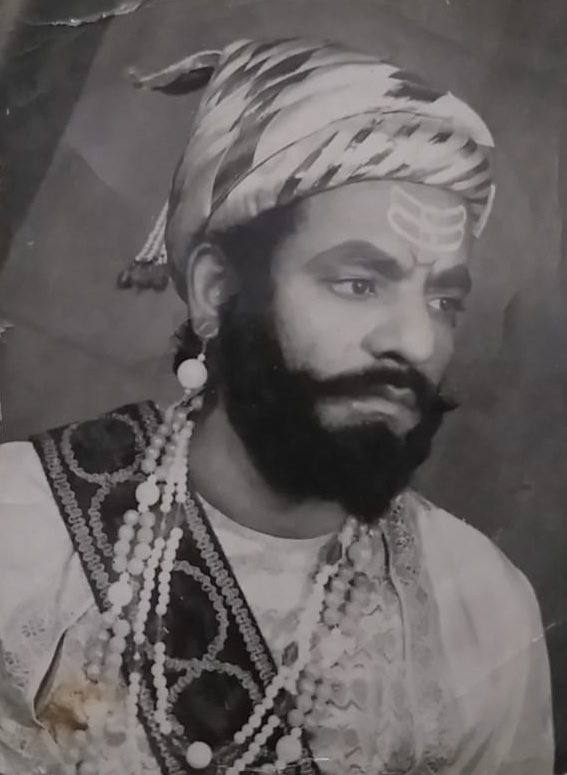
Momin Kavathekar playing role of Chhatrapati Shivaji Maharaj in Marathi drama Vedat Marathe Veer Daudale Saat

Some of these were also performed / broadcast on the Radio from All India Radio/ Aakashvani Kendra, Pune.

- “सोयऱ्याला धडा शिकवा (Soyaryala dhada shikawa) ”—Awareness in society about ills of Dowry
- “हुंड्या पायी घटल सार (Hundya payi ghadale saar) ”—Awareness to prohibit/stop tradition of Dowry.
- "दारू सुटली चालना भेटली (Daru sutali, chalana bhetali) "—Awareness to prohibit/stop young generation from alcohol addiction
- "दारूचा झटका संसाराला फटका (Darucha Zataka, Sansarala Fatak) "—Awareness of social problems arising due to addiction of alcohol.
- "मनाला आला एड्स टाळा (Manala Aala AIDS tala) "—Awareness in society about causes of AIDS and its effect on health, family life.
- "बुवाबाजी ऐका माझी (Buvabaji aika majhi) "—Awareness in society for eradication of Blind Faith & to fight superstition.
- "वंशाला दिवा...कशाला हवा? (Vanshala Diva, Kashala Hava?)" - Bringing out achievements of Daughter/females, to promote cause of "Save Girl Child"

=== Vag Natya ===
- "बाईने दावला इंगा (Bai ne dawala enga)"
- "ईश्कान घेतला बळी (Eshkane ghetala bali)"
- "तांबड फुटलं रक्ताचं (Tambada Futala Raktacha)"
- "फुटला पाझर पाषाणाला (Futala Pazar Pashanala)"
- "ठकास महाठक (Thakas Mahathak)"
- "भंगले स्वप्न महाराष्ट्रा (Bhangale Swapna Maharashtra)"
- "भक्त कबीर (Bhakt Kabeer)"
- "राया हौस माझी पुरी करा (Raya, Haus Mazi Puri Kara)"
- "सुशीला, मला माफ कर (Sushila mala maaf kar)" – Received ‘Chotu Juwekar Award (1980)’
- "दादा, खुर्ची सांभाळा (Dada, Khurchi Sambhala)

=== Songs popularized by ‘Tamasha troupes’ ===
- "सार हायब्रीड झाल...(Sar hybrid zal)"
- "हे असच चालायचं... (He asach chalaych"
- "खर नाही काही हल्लीच्या जगात...(Khar nahi kahi hallichya jagat)"
- "फॅशनच फॅड लागतंय गॉड...(Fashan che fad lagatay gwad)"
- "लंगडं.. मारताय उडून तंगड! (Langd maratay udun tangad)"
- "लई जोरात पिकलाय जोंधळा...(Lai jorat pikalay jondhala)"
- "मारू का गेन्बाची मेख…(Maru Ka Genbachi Mekh)"
- "बडे मजेसे मेरेज किया…(Bade majese marriage kiya)"
- "महात्मा फुल्यांची घेऊन स्फूर्ती, रात्रीच्या शाळेला चला होऊ भरती" .. Composed by Shri Ram Kadam for National Literacy Mission

=== Movie songs ===
- "गंगाराम आला .....(Gangaram aala)"
- "मुरली माझा कष्टकरी..(Murali Maza Kashtkari)"
- "वि.आय.पी. वि.आय.पी (VIP VIP) ....(VIP VIP | VIP Gadhav | Kunal Ganjawala & Ravi Wayhole)"
- "चिकणी चमेली...(Chikani chameli) (Zumba | VIP Gadhav | Pooja Kasekar & Bhau Kadam | Kavita Raam & Ravi Wavhole)"

=== Musical Albums / Devotional Songs ===
Devotional songs, adoring Hindu God/Goddess, truly represent the secular social fabric of Maharashtra, well developed under the Bhakti Movement (Warkari Sampraday). It represents the Ganga-Jamuni culture of India.

- "Ramayan Katha"
- "Ashtavinayak Aarti"
- "Satwachi Ambabai"
- "Nawasa chi Yemai"
- "Yemai cha Darbar"
- "Karha Nadichya Tirawar"
- "Kalagi Tura"
- "Vangyaat geli Gur"

=== Books ===
- "कलावंतांच्या आठवणी (Kalavantanchya Aathavani)" Published by Maharashtra Rajya Sahitya Sanskrutik Mandal and used as reference/ guide by students/ scholars studying the Maharashtra's folk art and the contribution of various artiste
- "भंगले स्वप्न महाराष्ट्र (Bhangale Swapn Maharastra)" ....Published in 1977 by Tridal Prakashan, Mumbai,
- "प्रेम स्वरूप आई (Prem Swarup Aai)" .... Collection of poems compiled & Published by Shri Rajendra Kankaria
- "अक्षरमंच (Akshar manch)" ... अखिल भारतीय मराठी प्रातिनिधिक कवितासंग्रह - २००४, Edited by Dr. Yogesh Joshi

== Awards and recognitions ==
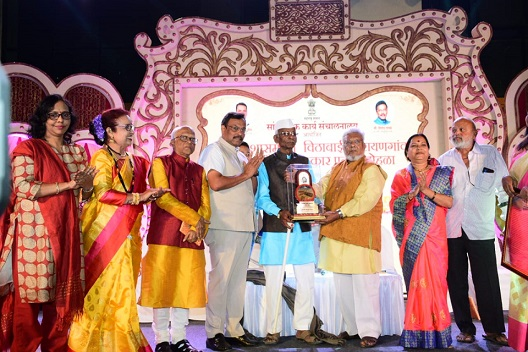
Bashir Momin Kavathekar being awarded with 'Vithabai Narayangavkar Jeevan Gaurav Puraskar' in 2018

- "विठाबाई नारायणगावकर जीवनगौरव पुरस्कार (२०१९)". Highest cultural award by Government of Maharashtra
- “मुस्लिम सत्यशोधक मंडळ विशेष सन्मान (२०१९)" Received at the hands of noted social activist Shri Baba Adhav.
- “महाराष्ट्र साहित्य परिषद पुरस्कार (२०१९)”.
- "लोकनेते गोपीनाथ मुंडे जीवनगौरव पुरस्कार (२०१८) "
- "विखे पाटील साहित्य कला गौरव (२०१४)"– Received at the hands of Maharashtra Chief Minister Shri Prithviraj Chavan.
- “ग्रांड सोशल अवार्ड, पुणे (२०१३) ”- Received at the hands of Bollywood cine actor Shri Jackie Shroff.
- "व्यसनमुक्ती पुरस्कार (२००३)" - Pune Zilla Parishad (Maharashtra Government), Received at the hands of Maharashtra Dy Chief Minister Shri Ajit Pawar
- "लोकशाहीर पुरस्कार (१९९९)" - Received at the hands of Chairman of "Aashwasan Samiti- Maharashtra State Assembly"
- "ग्रामवैभव पुरस्कार (१९८१)" - Received at the hands of veteran Marathi Cine actor Late Shri Nilu Phule
- "छोटू जुवेकर पुरस्कार, मुंबई (१९८०) " - Received at the hands of Bollywood cine actor Shri Amol Palekar

== Social work ==
Kavathekar' formed a small troupe (Kalapathak) who performed street plays as part of awareness campaign against social evils like prevalence of dowry, epidemics like AIDS, blind acceptance of superstitions & the exploitation that follows. He actively propagated in the various initiatives of Government like ‘Praudh Saksharta Mission / National Literacy Mission’, ‘VyasanMukti Abhiyan - campaign to minimize addiction of alcoholism’, ‘Gram Swachchata Abhiyan - a predecessor of ‘Swatch Bharat Abhiyan'. As a recognition of his contribution to the social cause, he was honored by Government with ‘Vyasan Mukti Purskar (व्यसनमुक्ती पुरस्कार)’.

He formed and headed an organisation of folk artist with objective to work for their development. He tried to address the issues such as scholarship for the children of artiste, Pension for the elderly artiste and pursued with Government Agencies to ensure the pension funds are released on time. He used to organise health check-up camps for the folk artiste in the Pune District. He advocated for documenting the contribution of folk artiste so that the art and culture is preserved and made available to next generation.

Since 2002, he focused on mentoring the young generation of artist and performers, thereby aiding in the development of the art and preserving the traditional art forms prevalent in Maharashtra culture. Thanks to Momin Kavathekar's recommendation, movie screen play writer Mr. Mohan Padawal got his first opportunity and professional assignment to write the story for a movie 'Gulhar'.
