= Kavathe Yamai =

Village in Maharashtra, India

Kavathe is a village located in Shirur Taluka of the Pune district of Maharashtra state. The poet Bashir Momin Kavathekar was a local tamasha (Marathi theatre) artist.

== Geography and climate ==
The village is located in the rain shadow area of the Sahyadris. It has an arid climate, irrigation from the river Ghod and from wells serve most of the village. Crops include sugar cane, bajra, groundnuts, and pomegranates.

== Demography ==
Hinduism (90% of the population) is the largest religion, followed by other religions such as Islam, Buddhism, Jainism. Sects/religions coexist in peaceful manner participating in each other's celebrations/ functions. Major castes are Dhangar and Marathas, both of whom share similar agriculturally-based livelihoods. Common family names include Mukhekar, Rode, Bhor, Ichake, Kandalkar, Wagdare, Pokale, Sandbhor, Ghode, Yede, and Ughade.

== See also ==
- Shirur, Maharashtra
