= Lavani =

Genre of Indian music

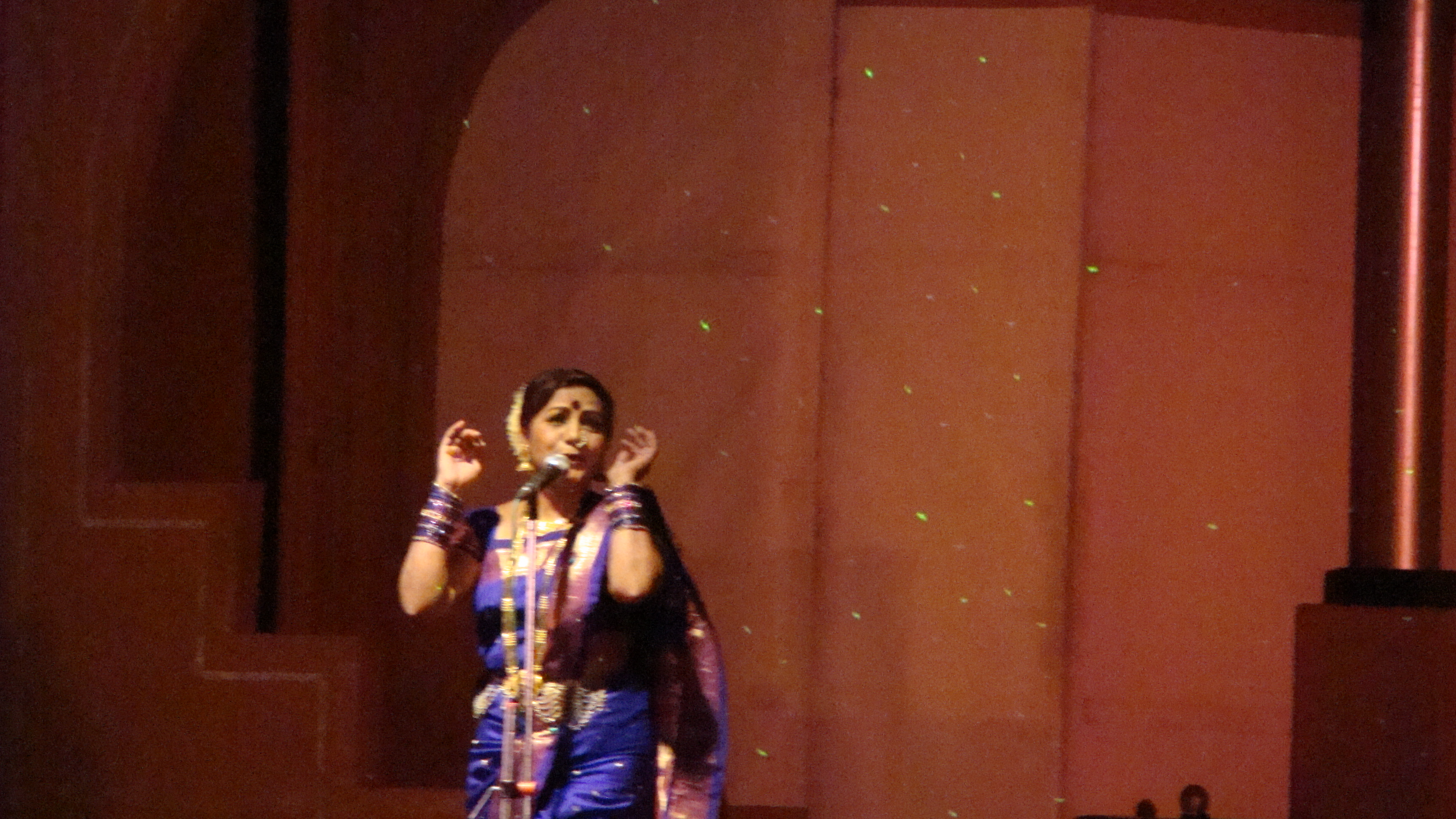
- Cultural origins: 17th century

Lavani is a genre of music popular in Maharashtra, India. Lavani is a combination of traditional song and dance, which particularly performed to the beats of dholki, a percussion instrument. Lavani is noted for its powerful rhythm. Lavani has contributed substantially to the development of Marathi folk theatre. In Maharashtra and southern Madhya Pradesh it is performed by the female performers wearing nine-yard long sarees also called Lugade saree. The songs are sung in a quick tempo.

== Etymology ==
According to a tradition, the word Lavani is derived from the word 'Lavanya' which means 'beauty'.

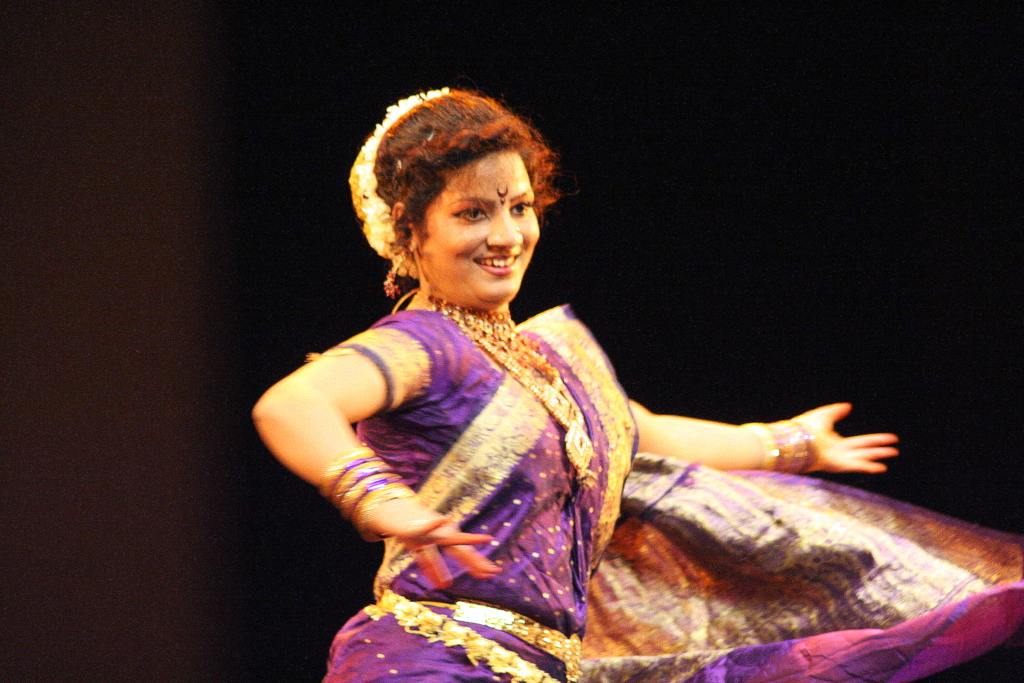
Lady performing Lavani dance

== Origin ==
Lavani dance originated from Maharashtra in the 18th and 19th century. Lavani dancers were patronised by Maratha lords and kings.

Lavani dance was generally performed by Dhangars living in Solapur.

== History and genres ==
Traditionally, this genre of folk dance deals with different and varied subject matters such as society, religion and politics. The songs in 'Lavani' are mostly emotional in sentiment and the dialogues tend to be pungent in socio-political satire. Originally, it was used as a form of entertainment and morale booster to the tired soldiers. Lavani Songs, which are sung along with dance, are usually sexual and erotic in nature. It is believed their origin is in the Prakrit Gathas collected by Hala. The Nirguni Lavani (philosophical) and the Shringari Lavani (sensual) are the two types. The devotional music of the Nirguni sect is popular all over Malwa.

Lavani developed into two distinct performances, namely Phadachi Lavani and Baithakichi Lavani. The Lavani sung and enacted in a public performance before a large audience in a theatrical atmosphere is called Phadachi Lavani and all the Tamasha Troupe (phad) in Maharashtra present it as one of its main sections. Lavani poet Bashir Momin Kavathekar had written Lavani's extensively for Tamasha Troups of Maharashtra during the late twentieth century. When the Lavani is sung in a closed chamber for a private and select audience by a girl sitting before the audience, it came to be known as Baithakichi Lavani. It is a kind of Mujra strictly performed for men and away from the village with no access for ladies or families to watch. The songs were written in sexually explicit double meaning.

== Clothing ==
The ladies who perform lavani wear a long sari called a nauvari, measuring around 9 yards in length. The sari is draped in a pant-like structure, as is typically associated with Maratha culture. The dancers tie a bun (Marathi: अंबाडा) in their hair. They wear heavy ornaments that include necklaces (such as the thushi, bormaal, and pohehaar) earrings (zumka), anklets (ghungru), a belt at the waist (kamarpatta), bangles, sindoor, etc. They usually wear a large bindi of dark red color on their forehead.

"The main subject matter of the Lavani is the love between man and woman in various forms. Married wife's menstruation, sexual union between husband and Wife, their love, soldier's amorous exploits, the wife's bidding farewell to the husband who is going to join the war, pangs of separation, adulterous love - the intensity of adulterous passion, childbirth: these are all the different themes of the Lavani. The Lavani poet out-steps the limits of social decency and control when it comes to the depiction of sexual passion." K. Ayyappapanicker, Sahitya Akademi

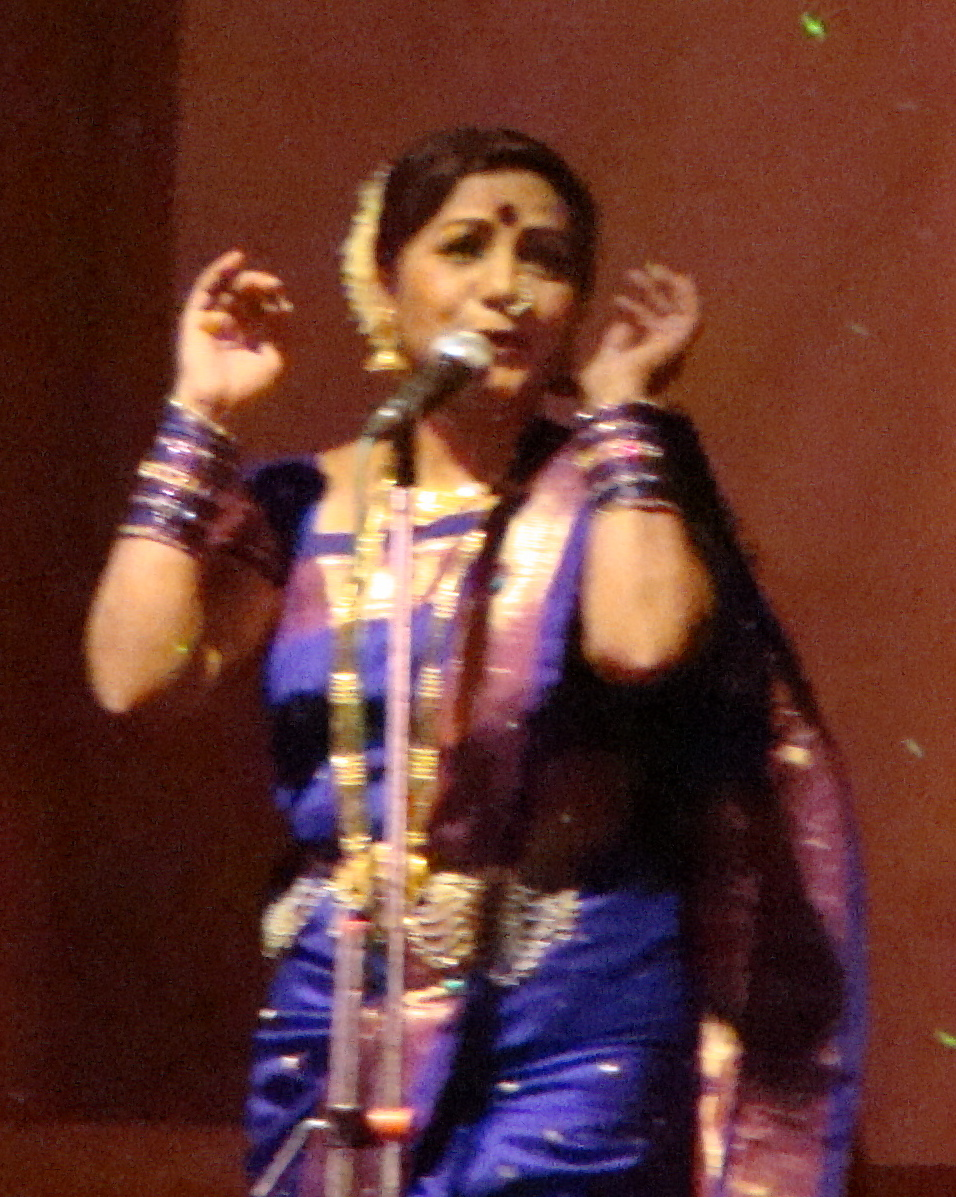
Surekha Punekar performing

Men who dance in Lavani along with the women lead dancer are called nat or the kinnars.

Although the beginnings of Lavani can be traced back to the 1560s, it came into prominence during the later days of the Peshwa rule. Several celebrated Marathi Shahir poet-singers, which include Parasharam (1754-1844), Ram Joshi (1762–1812), Anant Fandi (1744-1819), Honaji Bala (1754-1844), Prabhakar (1769-1843), Saganbhau, Lok Shahir Annabhau Sathe (1 August 1920 – 18 July 1969) and Bashir Momin Kavathekar (1 March 1947 – 12 November 2021) has contributed significantly for the development of this genre of music. Lokshahir Bashir Momin Kavathekar was a popular choice amongst the famous Lavani Dancers and his compositions had been presented on stage by various artists like Ms. Surekha Punekar, Ms. Sandhya Mane, Ms. Roshan Satarkar and many Tamasha Troupes since the early 1970s. His folk songs & Lavani's enthralled the audiences, helped in sustaining popularity of the 'Tamasha' and earned him 'Vithabai Narayangavkar Lifetime Achievement Award' for his lifelong contribution. Honaji Bala introduced tabla in place of the traditional dholki. He also developed the Baithakichi Lavani, a subgenre, which is presented by the singer in the seated position.

Satyabhamabai Pandharpurkar and Yamunabai Waikar are the popular present-day exponents of Lavani.

Shringar Lavani is mostly sung and danced on the stage by a female and written by a male. Vithabai Bhau Mang Narayangaonkar, Kantabai Satarkar, Surekha Punekar, Mangala Bansode, Sandhya Mane, Roshan Satarkar are well known artiste presenting Lavani on stage. Lavani can also be termed as a romantic song sung by a lady who is waiting for her lover to accept her, who longs for his love. Many Lavani dancers are from some castes of Maharashtra like Mahar Kolhati, and Matang.

Marathi films played an important role in making the Lavani genre accessible to the masses. Movies such as Pinjara and Natarang not only attempted to blend traditional music with social messages but also helped portray Lavani in a positive light.
