= Mangala Bansode =

Indian folk artist (born 1951)

- Born: 12 September 1951 (age 75); Narayangaon, Puna district, Bombay State, (Present-day Pune district, Maharashtra) India
- Known for: Tamasha artist
- Spouse: Ramachandra Bansode
- Parents: Anna Sawant Merchant (father); Vithabai Bhau Mang Narayangaonkar (mother)
- Awards: Vithabai Narayangaonkar Lifetime Achievement Award; Anna Bhau Sathe Puraskar
- Website: mangalabansode.com

Mangala Bansode is an Indian Tamasha folk artist popularly known as ‘Sangeetachi Rani’, from Maharashtra. She is the daughter of Vithabai Narayangaonkar, and has won the Vithabai Narayangaonkar Lifetime Achievement Award awarded by the government of Maharashtra. She works along with her son Nitin, who is the fifth generation of her family in the line. She is from the Village of Karawadi near Karad and her troupe has 150 persons in employment.

== Anecdotes ==
In January 2016 just before her performance in the Goa Lokotsav, a rumour spread about her death that she had to scotch by going to press. In the 2013 season her troupe received the biggest payment advances amongst all at Narayangaon's tamasha fair.
