= Kolhati =

Banjara community in India

The Kolhati are an Indian nomadic community that form a subgroup of the Banjara people. They belong to central India and Maharashtra. They traditionally are professional entertainers and acrobats. They are classified as a nomadic tribe by the government of Maharashtra. They have also been employed with tamasha troupes. The kolhati language is spoken in considerable numbers in Pune district. Kolhati lavani-tamasha performers have got social prestige from the patronage of the art form by the Maharashtra state government, and is vital to their identity as performing artists according to Morcom.
