= Tamasha =

Traditional form of Marathi theatre

Tamasha (Marathi: तमाशा) is a traditional form of Marathi theatre, often with singing and dancing, widely performed by local or travelling theatre groups within the state of Maharashtra, India. It has also been the subject of several Marathi films. Some Hindi movies have also included Tamasha-themed songs, known as Lavanis, in the past.

Traditional Tamasha is influenced by many Indian art forms and draws from such diverse traditions as kaveli, ghazals, Kathak dance, dashavatara, lalit and kirtan. There are two types of Tamasha: dholki bhaari and the older form, sangeet baari which contains more dance and music than drama. In Maharashtra, the Kolhati groups are traditionally associated with the performance of Tamasha.

== Etymology ==
The word "Tamasha" is a loanword from Persian, which in turn loaned it from Arabic, meaning a show or theatrical entertainment of some kind. The word has spread to Armenian, Hindi, Urdu and Marathi, to mean "fun" or "play". In Armenian language "To do Tamasha" means "To follow an interesting process or entertainment". Colloquially the word has come to represent commotion, or any activity or display with bustle and excitement, sometimes in the sense of "a tempest in a teacup".

== History ==
=== Origin and early years ===
The region of Maharashtra, has had a long theatrical tradition, one of the early references was found in the cave inscriptions at Nashik by Gautami Balashri, the mother of the 1st-century Satavahana ruler, Gautamiputras Satakarni. The inscription mentions him organizing Utsava and Samaja, forms off theatrical entertainment for his subjects.

Tamasha acquired a distinct form in late Peshwa period of Maratha Empire, in the 18th century, and incorporated elements of older traditional forms like Dasavatar, Gondhal, Kirtan, and Waghya-murali, part of Khandoba Bhakti Geet, amongst worshippers of the local god Khandoba.

In Maharashtra, there are two types of Tamasha, first is dholaki fadcha Tamasha and the other is sangeet baaricha Tamasha. Dholaki Fadcha tamasha is complete art, which includes song, dance, and theater. Now in Maharashtra there are only 18 to 20 full-time tamasha parties. Each tamasha mandal performs approximately 210 days in all over Maharashtra and also some border villages of Karnataka and Gujarat.

Traditional Tamasha format consisted of dancing-boys known as Nachya, who also played women's roles, a poet-composer known as Shahir, who played the traditional role of Sutradhar or a jester known as Songadya, who compered the show. However, with time, women started taking part in Tamasha. Marathi theatre made its beginning in 1843, and in the following years, Tamasha which was primarily constituted of singing and dancing expanded its thematic repertoire and added small dramatic and humorous skits, known as Vag Natya, to it. These were either in prose or comprised long narrative poems performed by the Shahir along with his chorus, with actors improvising their lines. Popular Vag composers of the time were Patthe Bapurao and Dattoba Sali, and one of their noted vag, Gadhavache Lagna (Marriage of Donkey) was popularized by Tamasha artist, Dadu Idurikar. Soon, noted Marathi writers started written Vags for Tamasha troupes. Lokshahir Bashir Momin Kavathekar wrote extensively for the famous Tamasha Troupes like Datta Mahadik Punekar, Raghuvir Khedkar, Kalu Balu Kawalapurkar, Surekha Punekar. Bashir Momin (Kavathekar) wrote short vag-natya based on the prevailing situations, challenges and on the topics which requires mass awareness about social issues like dowry, education. Some of his popular vag-natya's are 'Eshkane Ghetla Bali', 'Tambada Futala Raktacha', 'Bhakt Kabeer' & 'Bhangale Swapna Maharashtra'. Momin Kavathekar also wrote songs & Lavani's that enthralled the audiences, helped in sustaining popularity of the 'Tamasha' and earned him 'Vithabai Narayangavkar Lifetime Achievement Award' for his lifelong contribution.

As the textile industry started developing in Mumbai (then Bombay) in the 19th century, workers migrated here from the rural areas in large numbers. Soon their theatre did too, initially rural tamasha companies were invited to the city for performances. Though later numerous local tamasha companies flourished, patronized by mill workers living in Girgaum.

Traditional tamasha practitioners were from castes like Kolhati, Mahar, Mang and Bhatu from rural regions of Maharashtra, labelled low castes within the Indian caste system. Thus, in the late 19th century, religious reformers employed tamasha to castigate the caste system of the region. During the same period, Satyashodhak Samaj founded by Jyotirao Phule started organizing Satyashodhaki jalsa, which used the tamasha tradition in its political and reformist theatre, which was an amalgamation of proscenium tamasha and street theatre.

Government of Maharashtra has instituted annual award in the memory of late Vithabai Narayangavkar Lifetime Achievement Award for those who had extensively contributed to the preservation and propagation of the Tamasha Art. The award is being conferred since 2006 and noted recipients of the awards are Kantabai Satarkar, Vasant Avsarikar, Sulochana Nalawade, Haribhau Badhe, Mangala Bansode, Sadhu Patsute, Ankush Khade, Prabha Shivanekar, Bhima Sangavikar, Gangaram Kavathekar, Radhabai Khode Nashikkar, Madhukar Nerale. For year 2018, Lokshahir Bashir Momin Kavathekar has been conferred with this award for his lifelong contribution to the field of Tamasha through his prolific lavani's & Vag's. Folk artist Ms Gulab bai Sangamnerkar has been selected for this year 2019's award.

=== Post-independence ===
The rise of modern Marathi theatre movement in the post-independence era, which was largely "literary drama" from with a Westernized idiom, tamasha like other prevalent indigenous theatre forms, like jatra in Odisha and bhavai in Gujarat, was also deemed "debased", even "corrupt", while being relegated to being only "folk" form. The turning away of urban middle class audience from traditional forms, cause a disruption in the theatrical traditions besides creating a divide between urban and rural theatre, as tamasha continued to flourish out the urban pockets.

In 2002, the state had 450 tamasha troupes with approximately 10,000 artistes.

== Influence ==
Main elements of tamasha, like loud humour, suggestive lyrics and dance numbers, proved influential in the development the Bollywood idiom, which is based in Mumbai. Even today, the mainstream cinema or Masala films, complete with their suggestive dance numbers, now known as item number, and humour sequences remain largely entertainment oriented.

Over the years, some modern theatre practitioners have incorporated the traditional forms like tamasha and dashavatar into their plays. In the 1970s, during the rise of modern Marathi theatre, the tamasha form was employed as narrative device and style in several notable plays like Ghashiram Kotwal by Vijay Tendulkar, Vijaya Mehta's Marathi adaptations of Bertolt Brecht's The Good Woman of Setzuan as Devajine Karuna Keli (1972) and Caucasian Chalk Circle as Ajab Nyaya Vartulacha (1974), P. L. Deshpande's Teen paishacha Tamasha (1978), an adaptation of Brecht's The Threepenny Opera.

== In popular culture ==
The 1972, Marathi hit film, Pinjra directed by V. Shantaram, starring Shriram Lagoo and Sandhya in lead roles was set in the Tamasha musical theatre. Besides this other Marathi films made of Tamasha include, Sangte Aika (1959) directed by Anand Mane and starring Jayshree Gadkar, Sawaal Majha Aika! (1964) by Anant Mane and starring Jayshree Gadkar, Ek Hota Vidushak (1992) by Jabbar Patel, Natarang (2010) by Ravi Jadhav and Tamasha - Hach Khel Udya Punha (2011) by Milind Pednekar.

A 2006 multilingual documentary film, Silent Ghungroos, traces the origins of Tamasha in the Peshwa period to its contemporary form, where the form competes with modern entertainment mediums.

Many books have been written in the Marathi language which dwells on the Tamasha as an art, its problem, artist & their contributions. Few notable books are 'Tamasha-Kala aani Jivan' by Dr Chandanshive, 'Vagsamradni Kantabai Satarkar' by Dr Khedlekar, 'Kalavantanchya Aathavani' by B.K. Momin Kavathekar, 'Gabhulalelya Chandrabanat' (a fictional love story) by Vishwas Patil, 'Tmashatil Songadya' by B. S. Shinde, 'Tamshatil Stree Kalavant- Jivan aani Samasya' by Dr. Sadhana Burade and 'Tamasha Lokrangabhumi' by Rustum AchalKhamb.

== Tamasha in other languages ==
The word tamasha has been used in book and plays titles, including, Jaipur Tamasha, and theatre company, Tamasha Theatre Company.

- In the Telugu and Kannada language, tamasha means funny.
- In the Kiswahili language "tamasha" means show or festival.
- In Malayalam language, tamasha means joke.
- In the Bengali language, tamasha (or in some dialects tamsha) means joke or messing around.
- In the Chuvash language "tamasha" means distress or curiosity, brings amazement effect into dialogue, and also means fun of silly situation in theatre or life.
- In the Malay language "temasya" means event or festival.

== See also ==
- Lavani
- Mangala Bansode
- Vithabai Bhau Mang Narayangaonkar
- Silent Ghungroos
- Prakash Khandge
- Bashir Momin Kavathekar

== Bibliography ==
- K. R. Sawant (1983). Tamasha: A Unique Folk-theatre of Maharashtra. Natya Shikshan Kendra.
- Manohar Laxman Varadpande (1992). History of Indian Theatre. Abhinav Publications. ISBN 978-81-7017-278-9.
- Sudhanva Deshpande (2007). Theatre of the Streets: The Jana Natya Manch Experience. Jana Natya Manch. pp. 91–. GGKEY:N5P26BGEAQ9.
- Aparna Bhargava Dharwadker (2009). Theatres of Independence: Drama, Theory, and Urban Performance in India Since 1947. University of Iowa Press. ISBN 978-1-58729-642-0.
