= Lower Tapi Dam =

Padalsare Dam
- Location within Maharashtra
- Official name: Padalsare Dam(Lower tapi project)D03032
- Location: Jalgaon, Amalner
- Coordinates: 21.1869627°N 75.0004005°E
- Owners: Government of Maharashtra, India

Dam and spillways
- Type of dam: Earthfill
- Impounds: Tapi River
- Height: 21.8 m (72 ft)
- Length: 860 m (2,820 ft)
- Dam volume: 303.72 km^{3} (72.87 cu mi)

Reservoir
- Total capacity: 11,470 km^{3} (2,750 cu mi)
- Surface area: 3,150 km^{2} (1,220 sq mi)

Padalsare Dam is a major component of the (Lower Tapi Project), an irrigation project on the Tapi River in Maharashtra, India. The project was initiated in 1999 by the Government of Maharashtra with the objective of improving irrigation and water availability in the Khandesh region. The dam is located near Padalsare village in Amalner taluka of Jalgaon district. The Lower Tapi Project aims to support agricultural development, provide water for domestic use, and enhance regional water management. The Padalsare Dam, as part of this project, plays a significant role in regulating river flow and ensuring a reliable water supply to surrounding areas.

== Specifications ==
The height of the dam above lowest foundation is 21.8 m (72 ft) while the length is 860 m (2,820 ft). The volume content is 303.72 km^{3} (72.87 cu mi) and gross storage capacity is 16,460.00 km^{3} (3,948.96 cu mi).

== Purpose ==
- Irrigation

== See also ==
- Dams in Maharashtra
- List of reservoirs and dams in India
