= Deogad Dam =

- Official name: Deogad Dam D03048
- Location: Phonda
- Opening date: 2005
- Owners: Government of Maharashtra, India

Dam and spillways
- Type of dam: Earthfill
- Impounds: Kurli river - Shivganga
- Height: 54.68 m (179.4 ft)
- Length: 1,784 m (5,853 ft)
- Dam volume: 0.06200 km^{3} (0.01487 cu mi)

Reservoir
- Total capacity: 0.098020 km^{3} (0.023516 cu mi)
- Surface area: 5.731 km^{2} (2.213 sq mi)

Deogad Dam, is an earthfill dam on Kurli river near Phonda, Sindhudurg district in the state of Maharashtra in India.

== Specifications ==
The height of the dam above the lowest foundation is 54.68 m (179.4 ft) while the length is 1,784 m (5,853 ft). The volume content is 0.06200 km^{3} (0.01487 cu mi) and gross storage capacity is 0.100428 km^{3} (0.024094 cu mi).

== Purpose ==
- Irrigation
  Hydroelectricity

== See also ==
- Dams in Maharashtra
- List of reservoirs and dams in India
