= Andra Valley Dam =

- Location within Maharashtra
- Official name: Andra Valley Dam
- Location: Maval
- Coordinates: 18°47′52.84″N 73°38′27.91″E
- Opening date: 2003
- Owners: Government of Maharashtra, India

Dam and spillways
- Type of dam: Earthfill
- Impounds: Andra river
- Height: 40.45 m (132.7 ft)
- Length: 330 m (1,080 ft)
- Dam volume: 207.86 km^{3} (49.87 cu mi)

Reservoir
- Total capacity: 82,750 km^{3} (19,850 cu mi)
- Surface area: 7,421 km^{2} (2,865 sq mi)

Andra Valley Dam, is an earthfill dam on Andra river near Maval, Pune district in the state of Maharashtra in India.

== Specifications ==
The height of the dam above lowest foundation is 40.45 m (132.7 ft) while the length is 330 m (1,080 ft). The volume content is 207.86 km^{3} (49.87 cu mi), and the gross storage capacity is 83,310.00 km^{3} (19,987.13 cu mi).

== See also ==
- Dams in Maharashtra
- List of reservoirs and dams in India
