= Katangi Dam =

- Location within Maharashtra
- Official name: Katangi Dam
- Location: Goregaon
- Coordinates: 21.331°N 80.177°E
- Owners: Government of Maharashtra, India

Dam and spillways
- Type of dam: Earthfill
- Impounds: Katanginalla river
- Height: 13.65 m (44.8 ft)
- Length: 2,360 m (7,740 ft)
- Dam volume: 464.12 km^{3} (111.35 cu mi)

Reservoir
- Total capacity: 9,400 km^{3} (2,300 cu mi)
- Surface area: 31.02 km^{2} (11.98 sq mi)

Katangi Dam, is an earthfill dam on Katanginalla river near Goregaon, Gondia district in state of Maharashtra in India.

== Specifications ==
The height of the dam above lowest foundation is 13.65 m (44.8 ft) while the length is 2,360 m (7,740 ft). The volume content is 464.12 km^{3} (376,270,000 acre⋅ft) and gross storage capacity is 11,120.00 km^{3} (9.01513×10^{9} acre⋅ft).

== Purpose ==
- Irrigation
- Fishing
- Drinking water

== See also ==
- Dams in Maharashtra
- List of reservoirs and dams in India
