= Visapur Dam =

- Location within Maharashtra
- Official name: Visapur Dam D01010
- Location: Srigonda
- Coordinates: 18.8035565°N 74.5827484°E
- Opening date: 1936
- Owners: Government of Maharashtra, India

Dam and spillways
- Type of dam: Earthfill
- Impounds: Hanga river
- Height: 26 m (85 ft)
- Length: 2,692 m (8,832 ft)
- Dam volume: 130 km^{3} (31 cu mi)

Reservoir
- Total capacity: 33,320 km^{3} (7,990 cu mi)
- Surface area: 0 km^{2} (0 sq mi)

Visapur Dam, is an earthfill dam on Hanga river near Srigonda, Ahmednagar district in the state of Maharashtra in India.

== Specifications ==
The height of the dam above its lowest foundation is 26 m (85 ft) while the length is 2,692 m (8,832 ft). The volume content is 130 km^{3} (31 cu mi) and gross storage capacity is 33,320.00 km^{3} (7,993.89 cu mi).

== Purpose ==
- Irrigation

== See also ==
- Dams in Maharashtra
- List of reservoirs and dams in India
