= Gunjwani Dam =

Gunjwane Dam
- Location within Maharashtra
- Official name: Gunjwane Dam
- Location: Velhe
- Coordinates: 18.3014285°N 73.6194598°E
- Opening date: 2000
- Owners: Government of Maharashtra, India

Dam and spillways
- Type of dam: Earthfill; Gravity
- Impounds: Kanand river
- Height: 52.82 m (173.3 ft)
- Length: 1,730 m (5,680 ft)
- Dam volume: 6,871 km^{3} (1,648 cu mi)

Reservoir
- Total capacity: 104,480 km^{3} (25,070 cu mi)
- Surface area: 6,410 km^{2} (2,470 sq mi)

Gunjwane Dam, is an earthfill and gravity dam on Kanandi river near Velhe, Pune district in state of Maharashtra in India.

== Specifications ==
The height of the dam above lowest foundation is 52.82 m (173.3 ft) while the length is 1,730 m (5,680 ft). The volume content is 6,871 km^{3} (1,648 cu mi) and gross storage capacity is 104,690.00 km^{3} (25,116.47 cu mi).

The purpose of Gunjwane project is irrigation. Here new type of irrigation system is used called micro irrigation system. Here water distribution is done by P D N .

== See also ==
- Dams in Maharashtra
- List of reservoirs and dams in India
