= Ashti Dam, Mohol =

Ashti dam
- Location within Maharashtra
- Official name: Ashti dam
- Location: Mohol
- Coordinates: 17.8002707°N 75.4275261°E
- Opening date: 1883
- Owners: Government of Maharashtra, India

Dam and spillways
- Type of dam: Earthfill
- Impounds: Ashti river
- Height: 17.6 m (58 ft)
- Length: 3,871 m (12,700 ft)
- Dam volume: 0 km^{3} (0 cu mi)

Reservoir
- Total capacity: 23,000 km^{3} (5,500 cu mi)

Ashti dam, is an earthfill dam on Ashti River near Mohol, Solapur district in state of Maharashtra in India.

== Specifications ==
The height of the dam above lowest foundation is 17.6 m (58 ft) while the length is 3,871 m (12,700 ft). The gross storage capacity is 40,000.00 km^{3} (9,596.51 cu mi).

== Purpose ==
- Irrigation

== See also ==
- Dams in Maharashtra
- List of reservoirs and dams in India
