= Malkhed Dam =

Dam in ner yavatmal

- Location within Maharashtra
- Official name: Malkhed Dam D03198
- Location: Chandur Rly
- Coordinates: 20.8369943°N 77.9067993°E
- Opening date: 1972
- Owners: Government of Maharashtra, India

Dam and spillways
- Type of dam: Earthfill
- Impounds: Kholad river
- Height: 17.05 m (55.9 ft)
- Length: 1,422 m (4,665 ft)
- Dam volume: 481 km^{3} (115 cu mi)

Reservoir
- Total capacity: 8,960 km^{3} (2,150 cu mi)
- Surface area: 6,717 km^{2} (2,593 sq mi)

Malkhed Dam, is an earthfill dam on Kholad river near Chandur, Amravati district in state of Maharashtra in India.

== Specifications ==
The height of the dam above lowest foundation is 17.05 m (55.9 ft) while the length is 1,422 m (4,665 ft). The volume content is 481 km^{3} (115 cu mi) and gross storage capacity is 10,900.00 km^{3} (2,615.05 cu mi).

== Purpose ==
- Irrigation
- Water Supply

== See also ==
- Dams in Maharashtra
- List of reservoirs and dams in India
