= Pujaritola Dam =

Kotra Dam
- Location within Maharashtra
- Official name: Pujaritola Dam
- Location: Kotra
- Coordinates: 21.2121984°N 80.4240418°E
- Opening date: 1970
- Owners: Government of Maharashtra, India

Dam and spillways
- Type of dam: Earthfill; Gravity
- Impounds: Bagh river
- Height: 19.2 m (63 ft)
- Length: 2,661 m (8,730 ft)
- Dam volume: 664 km^{3} (159 cu mi)

Reservoir
- Total capacity: 48,690 km^{3} (11,680 cu mi)
- Surface area: 17,650 km^{2} (6,810 sq mi)

Pujaritola Dam (Kotra Dam) is an earth-fill and gravity dam on Bagh river near Kotra, Gondia district in the state of Maharashtra in India.

== Specifications ==
The height of the dam above lowest foundation is 19.2 m (63 ft) while the length is 2,661 m (8,730 ft). The volume content is 664 km^{3} (159 cu mi) and gross storage capacity is 65,110.00 km^{3} (15,620.72 cu mi).

== Purpose ==
- Irrigation

== See also ==
- Dams in Maharashtra
- List of reservoirs and dams in India
