= Matoba Dam =

- Interactive map of Matoba Dam
- Official name: Matoba Dam
- Location: Daund
- Opening date: 1978
- Owners: Government of Maharashtra, India

Dam and spillways
- Type of dam: Earthfill
- Impounds: Mulamutha river
- Height: 17.5 m (57 ft)
- Length: 1,662 m (5,453 ft)
- Dam volume: 45.6 km^{3} (10.9 cu mi)

Reservoir
- Total capacity: 37,100 km^{3} (8,900 cu mi)
- Surface area: 1,900 km^{2} (730 sq mi)

Matoba Dam, is an earthfill dam on Mulamutha river near Daund in the state of Maharashtra in India.

== Specifications ==
The height of the dam above lowest foundation is 17.5 m (57 ft) while the length is 1,662 m (5,453 ft). The volume content is 45.6 km^{3} (10.9 cu mi) and gross storage capacity is 45,200.00 km^{3} (10,844.06 cu mi).

== Purpose ==
- Irrigation

== See also ==
- Dams in Maharashtra
- List of reservoirs and dams in India
