= Kalyangirija Dam =

- Location within Maharashtra
- Official name: Kalyangirija Dam D01321
- Location: Jalna
- Coordinates: 19.83309°N 76.15695°E
- Opening date: 1972
- Owners: Government of Maharashtra, India

Dam and spillways
- Type of dam: Earthfill
- Impounds: Kalyangirija river
- Height: 22.07 m (72.4 ft)
- Length: 1,183 m (3,881 ft)
- Dam volume: 520 km^{3} (120 cu mi)

Reservoir
- Total capacity: 8,469 km^{3} (2,032 cu mi)
- Surface area: 568 km^{2} (219 sq mi)

Kalyangirija Dam, is an earthfill dam on Kalyangirija river near Jalna in the state of Maharashtra in India.

== Specifications ==
The height of the dam above lowest foundation is 22.07 m (72.4 ft) while the length is 1,183 m (3,881 ft). The volume content is 520 km^{3} (120 cu mi) and gross storage capacity is 10,160.00 km^{3} (2,437.51 cu mi).

== Purpose ==
- Irrigation

== See also ==
- Dams in Maharashtra
- List of reservoirs and dams in India
