= Nawatha Dam =

- Official name: Nawatha Dam
- Location: Dhule
- Demolition date: N/A
- Owners: Government of Maharashtra, India

Dam and spillways
- Type of dam: Earthfill
- Impounds: Burai river
- Height: 29 m (95 ft)
- Length: 2,610 m (8,560 ft)
- Dam volume: 1,427 km^{3} (342 cu mi)

Reservoir
- Total capacity: 33,910 km^{3} (8,140 cu mi)
- Surface area: 7,360 km^{2} (2,840 sq mi)

Nawatha Dam, is an earthfill dam on Burai river near Dhule in the state of Maharashtra in India.

== Specifications ==
The height of the dam above lowest foundation is 29 m (95 ft) while the length is 2,610 m (8,560 ft). The volume content is 1,427 km^{3} (342 cu mi) and gross storage capacity is 36,930.00 km^{3} (8,859.98 cu mi).

== Purpose ==
- Irrigation

== See also ==
- Dams in Maharashtra
- List of reservoirs and dams in India
