= Sina Dam =

- Location within Maharashtra
- Official name: Sina Dam D02841
- Location: Karjat
- Coordinates: 18.8246644°N 74.9408018°E
- Opening date: 1986
- Owners: Government of Maharashtra, India

Dam and spillways
- Type of dam: Earthfill
- Impounds: Sina river
- Height: 28.5 m (94 ft)
- Length: 1,580 m (5,180 ft)
- Dam volume: 681.5 km^{3} (163.5 cu mi)
- Spillway type: Ogee crest

Reservoir
- Total capacity: 0 km^{3} (0 cu mi)
- Surface area: 12,834 km^{2} (4,955 sq mi)

Sina Dam, is an earthfill dam on Sina river near Karjat in Ahmednagar district in the state of Maharashtra in India.

== Specifications ==
The height of the dam above lowest foundation is 28.5 m (94 ft) while the length is 1,580 m (5,180 ft). The volume content is 681.5 km^{3} (163.5 cu mi) and gross storage capacity is 67,950.00 km^{3} (16,302.07 cu mi).

== Purpose ==
- Irrigation

== See also ==
- Dams in Maharashtra
- List of reservoirs and dams in India
