= Talamba Dam =

- Location within Maharashtra
- Official name: Talamba Dam D03011
- Location: Kudal
- Coordinates: 16.041215°N 73.890159°E
- Demolition date: N/A
- Owners: Government of Maharashtra, India

Dam and spillways
- Type of dam: Earthfill
- Impounds: Karli river
- Height: 57.41 m (188.4 ft)
- Length: 2,955 m (9,695 ft)
- Dam volume: 7,343 km^{3} (1,762 cu mi)

Reservoir
- Total capacity: 285,630 km^{3} (68,530 cu mi)
- Surface area: 21,350 km^{2} (8,240 sq mi)

Talamba Dam, is an earthfill dam on Karli river near Kudal, Sindhudurg district in the state of Maharashtra in India.

== Specifications ==
The height of the dam above lowest foundation is 57.41 m (188.4 ft) while the length is 2,955 m (9,695 ft). The volume content is 7,343 km^{3} (1,762 cu mi) and gross storage capacity is 308,750.00 km^{3} (74,073.06 cu mi).

== Purpose ==
- Irrigation
- Hydroelectricity

== See also ==
- Dams in Maharashtra
- List of reservoirs and dams in India
