= Khairbandha Dam =

Dam in Gondia, Maharashtra in India

- Location within Maharashtra
- Official name: Khairbandha Dam D00997
- Location: Gondia
- Coordinates: 21.4832212°N 80.070033°E
- Opening date: 1903
- Owners: Government of Maharashtra, India

Dam and spillways
- Type of dam: Earthfill
- Impounds: Fattepur river
- Height: 18.16 m (59.6 ft)
- Length: 2,205 m (7,234 ft)
- Dam volume: 243.52 km^{3} (58.42 cu mi)

Reservoir
- Total capacity: 15,953 km^{3} (3,827 cu mi)
- Surface area: 4,147 km^{2} (1,601 sq mi)

Khairbandha Dam, is an earthfill dam on Fattepur river near Gondia in State of Maharashtra in India.

== Specifications ==
The height of the dam above lowest foundation is 18.16 m (59.6 ft) while the length is 2,205 m (7,234 ft). The volume content is 243.52 km^{3} (58.42 cu mi) and gross storage capacity is 16,798.00 km^{3} (4,030.05 cu mi).

== Purpose ==
- Irrigation

== See also ==
- Dams in Maharashtra
- List of reservoirs and dams in India
