= Chenna Dam =

- Interactive map of Chenna Dam
- Official name: Chenna Dam
- Location: Gadchiroli
- Owners: Government of Maharashtra, India

Dam and spillways
- Type of dam: Earthfill
- Impounds: Chenna river
- Height: 33 m (108 ft)
- Length: 740 m (2,430 ft)
- Dam volume: 413 km^{3} (99 cu mi)

Reservoir
- Total capacity: 14,790 km^{3} (3,550 cu mi)
- Surface area: 1,930 km^{2} (750 sq mi)

Chenna Dam, is an earthfill dam on Chenna river near Gadchiroli in state of Maharashtra in India.

== Specifications ==
The height of the dam above lowest foundation is 33 m (108 ft) while the length is 740 m (2,430 ft). The volume content is 413 km^{3} (99 cu mi) and gross storage capacity is 14,800.00 km^{3} (3,550.71 cu mi).

== Purpose ==
- Irrigation

== See also ==
- Dams in Maharashtra
- List of reservoirs and dams in India
