= Adhala Dam =

Dam in Ahmednagar district, Maharashtra, India

- Location within Maharashtra
- Official name: Adhala Dam
- Location: Akole, Deothan
- Coordinates: 19°38′23″N 74°1′37″E
- Construction began: 1966
- Opening date: 1976
- Owners: Government of Maharashtra, India
- Operator: Abhishek Pawar

Dam and spillways
- Type of dam: Earthfill
- Impounds: Adhala river
- Height: 40 m (130 ft)
- Length: 623 m (2,044 ft)
- Width (crest): 6.5 mtr
- Dam volume: 1060 mcft 1,437 km^{3} (345 cu mi)
- Spillway type: Non gated
- Spillway capacity: 54900 cusecs

Reservoir
- Creates: Adhala dam
- Total capacity: 27,600 km^{3} (6,600 cu mi)
- Catchment area: 177.10 km^{2} (68.38 sq mi)
- Surface area: 2.306 km^{2} (0.890 sq mi)
- Maximum water depth: 40.02 m

Adhala Dam, is an earthfill dam on Adhala river near Akole, Deothan, Ahmednagar district in state of Maharashtra in India.

== Specifications ==
The height of the dam above lowest foundation is 40 m (130 ft) while the length is 623 m (2,044 ft). The volume content is 1,437 km^{3} (345 cu mi) and gross storage capacity is 30,000.00 km^{3} (7,197.38 cu mi).

- Capacity in TMC: 1.02(By Abhi Thorat)

== Purpose ==
- Irrigation in Akole, Sagamner & Sinner Tahsil
- Drinking Water supply to Devthan, Hivargaon Ambre, Ganore, Dongargaon & Pimplegaon villages (created by government)

== See also ==
- Dams in Maharashtra
- List of reservoirs and dams in India
