= Asolamendha Dam =

Dam in Maharashtra, India

- Location within Maharashtra
- Official name: Asolamendha Dam
- Location: Shindewadi
- Coordinates: 20.2420355°N 79.8219844°E
- Opening date: 1918
- Owners: Government of Maharashtra, India

Dam and spillways
- Type of dam: Earthfill
- Impounds: local river
- Height: 18.08 m (59.3 ft)
- Length: 1,376.52 m (4,516.1 ft)
- Dam volume: 350 km^{3} (84 cu mi)

Reservoir
- Total capacity: 56,375 km^{3} (13,525 cu mi)
- Surface area: 1,880 km^{2} (730 sq mi)

Asolamendha Dam is an earthfill dam on local river near Shindewadi, Chandrapur district in state of Maharashtra in India.

== Specifications ==
The height of the dam above lowest foundation is 18.08 m (59.3 ft) while the length is 1,376.52 m (4,516.1 ft). The volume content is 350 km^{3} (84 cu mi) and gross storage capacity is 67,015.00 km^{3} (16,077.75 cu mi).

== Purpose ==
- Irrigation

== See also ==
- Dams in Maharashtra
- List of reservoirs and dams in India
