= Dheku Dam =

- Location within Maharashtra
- Official name: Dheku Dam D01120
- Location: Vaijapur
- Coordinates: 20.1061669°N 74.9327771°E
- Opening date: 1960
- Owners: Government of Maharashtra, India

Dam and spillways
- Type of dam: Earthfill
- Impounds: Dheku river
- Height: 20 m (66 ft)
- Length: 2,421 m (7,943 ft)
- Dam volume: 137 km^{3} (33 cu mi)

Reservoir
- Total capacity: 12,160 km^{3} (2,920 cu mi)
- Surface area: 447 km^{2} (173 sq mi)

Dheku Dam, is an earthfill dam on Dheku river near Vaijapur, Aurangabad district in the state of Maharashtra in India.

== Specifications ==
The height of the dam above lowest foundation is 20 m (66 ft) while the length is 2,421 m (7,943 ft). The volume content is 137 km^{3} (33 cu mi) and gross storage capacity is 14,000.00 km^{3} (3,358.78 cu mi).

== Purpose ==
- Irrigation

== See also ==
- Dams in Maharashtra
- List of reservoirs and dams in India
