= Madan Dam =

- Location within Maharashtra
- Official name: Madan Dam D03099
- Location: Arvi
- Coordinates: 20.9376304°N 78.5348091°E
- Opening date: 2003
- Owners: Government of Maharashtra, India

Dam and spillways
- Type of dam: Earthfill
- Impounds: Waghadinalla river
- Height: 26.55 m (87.1 ft)
- Length: 1,291 m (4,236 ft)
- Dam volume: 976.14 km^{3} (234.19 cu mi)

Reservoir
- Total capacity: 10,460 km^{3} (2,510 cu mi)

Madan Dam, is an earthfill dam on Waghadinalla river near Arvi, Wardha district in the state of Maharashtra in India.

== Specifications ==
The height of the dam above lowest foundation is 26.55 m (87.1 ft) while the length is 1,291 m (4,236 ft). The volume content is 976.14 km^{3} (234.19 cu mi) and gross storage capacity is 11,460.00 km^{3} (2,749.40 cu mi).

== Purpose ==
- Irrigation

== See also ==
- Dams in Maharashtra
- List of reservoirs and dams in India
