= Wadishewadi Dam =

- Location within Maharashtra
- Official name: Wadishewadi Dam D03129
- Location: near wadi shewade village
- Coordinates: 21.151916°N 74.589701°E
- Owners: Government of Maharashtra, India

Dam and spillways
- Type of dam: Earthfill
- Impounds: burai river
- Height: 36.5 m (120 ft)
- Length: 614.5 m (2,016 ft)
- Dam volume: 324 km^{3} (78 cu mi)

Reservoir
- Total capacity: 91,810 km^{3} (22,030 cu mi)
- Surface area: 18,230 km^{2} (7,040 sq mi)

Wadishewadi Dam, is an earthfill dam on burai river near Shindkheda, dhule district in the state of Maharashtra in India.

== Specifications ==
The height of the dam above its lowest foundation is 36.5 m (120 ft) while the length is 614.5 m (2,016 ft). The volume content is 324 km^{3} (78 cu mi) and gross storage capacity is 92,190.00 km^{3} (22,117.56 cu mi).

== Purpose ==
- Irrigation

== See also ==
- Dams in Maharashtra
- List of reservoirs and dams in India
