= Human Dam =

- Location within Maharashtra
- Official name: Human Dam
- Location: Chandrapur
- Coordinates: 20°19′0″N 79°32′0″E
- Demolition date: N/A
- Owners: Government of Maharashtra, India

Dam and spillways
- Type of dam: Earthfill; Gravity
- Impounds: Human river
- Height: 28 m (92 ft)
- Length: 3,222 m (10,571 ft)
- Dam volume: 2,448 km^{3} (587 cu mi)

Reservoir
- Total capacity: 2.24559×10^{6} km^{3} (7.9302×10^{16} cu ft)
- Surface area: 80,930 km^{2} (31,250 sq mi)

Human Dam is an earthfill and gravity dam on the Human river near Chandrapur in the state of Maharashtra in India.

== Specifications ==
The height of the dam above lowest foundation is 28 m (92 ft) while the length is 3,222 m (10,571 ft). The volume content is 2,448 km^{3} (587 cu mi) and gross storage capacity is 313,731 km^{3} (75,268 cu mi).

== Purpose ==
Irrigation.

== See also ==
- Dams in Maharashtra
- List of reservoirs and dams in India
