= Bokani Dam =

- Interactive map of Bokani Dam
- Official name: Bokani Dam
- Location: Udgir
- Opening date: 1994
- Owners: Government of Maharashtra, India

Dam and spillways
- Type of dam: Earthfill
- Impounds: local river
- Height: 17.03 m (55.9 ft)
- Length: 1,440 m (4,720 ft)
- Dam volume: 0 km^{3} (0 cu mi)

Reservoir
- Total capacity: 0.08590 km^{3} (0.02061 cu mi)
- Surface area: 3.170 km^{2} (1.224 sq mi)

Bokani Dam, is an earthfill dam on local river near Udgir in state of Maharashtra in India.

== Specifications ==
The height of the dam above lowest foundation is 17.03 m (55.9 ft) while the length is 1,440 m (4,720 ft). The volume content is 0 km^{3} (0 cu mi) and gross storage capacity is 0.013460 km^{3} (0.003229 cu mi).

== Purpose ==
- Irrigation

== See also ==
- Dams in Maharashtra
- List of reservoirs and dams in India
