= Karwand Dam =

- Location within Maharashtra
- Official name: Karwand Dam D01234
- Location: Sirpur
- Coordinates: 21.452691°N 74.964487°E
- Opening date: 1970
- Owners: Government of Maharashtra, India

Dam and spillways
- Type of dam: Earthfill
- Impounds: Arunawati river
- Height: 39.3 m (129 ft)
- Length: 2,966 m (9,731 ft)
- Dam volume: 1,191 km^{3} (286 cu mi)

Reservoir
- Total capacity: 31,500 km^{3} (7,600 cu mi)
- Surface area: 0 km^{2} (0 sq mi)

Karwand Dam, is an earthfill dam on Arunawati river near Shirpur, Dhule district in state of Maharashtra in India.

== Specifications ==
The height of the dam above lowest foundation is 39.3 m (129 ft) while the length is 2,966 m (9,731 ft). The volume content is 1,191 km^{3} (286 cu mi) and gross storage capacity is 33,840.00 km^{3} (8,118.65 cu mi).

== Purpose ==
- Irrigation

== See also ==
- Dams in Maharashtra
- List of reservoirs and dams in India
