= Pathari Dam =

- Location within Maharashtra
- Official name: Pathari Dam D04550
- Location: Barshi
- Coordinates: 18.3207965°N 75.8213716°E
- Opening date: 1905
- Owners: Government of Maharashtra, India

Dam and spillways
- Type of dam: Earthfill
- Impounds: local river
- Height: 18.43 m (60.5 ft)
- Length: 2,070 m (6,790 ft)
- Dam volume: 0 km^{3} (0 cu mi)

Reservoir
- Total capacity: 11,620 km^{3} (2,790 cu mi)
- Surface area: 0 km^{2} (0 sq mi)

Pathari Dam, is an earthfill dam on local river near Barshi, Solapur district in the state of Maharashtra in India.

== Specifications ==
The height of the dam above lowest foundation is 18.43 m (60.5 ft) while the length is 2,070 m (6,790 ft). The volume content is 0 km^{3} (0 cu mi) and gross storage capacity is 11,880.00 km^{3} (2,850.16 cu mi).

== Purpose ==
- Irrigation

== See also ==
- Dams in Maharashtra
- List of reservoirs and dams in India
