= Purna Dam =

- Location within Maharashtra
- Official name: Purna Dam D03125
- Location: Amravati
- Coordinates: 21.3748511°N 77.7596157°E
- Opening date: 2006
- Demolition date: N/A
- Owners: Government of Maharashtra, India

Dam and spillways
- Type of dam: Earthfill
- Impounds: Purna river
- Height: 38 m (125 ft)
- Length: 3,120 m (10,240 ft)
- Dam volume: 1,277 km^{3} (306 cu mi)

Reservoir
- Total capacity: 35,370 km^{3} (8,490 cu mi)
- Surface area: 5,880 km^{2} (2,270 sq mi)

Purna Dam, is an earthfill dam on Purna river near Amravati in the state of Maharashtra in India.

== Specifications ==
The height of the dam above lowest foundation is 38 m (125 ft) while the length is 3,120 m (10,240 ft). The volume content is 1,277 km^{3} (306 cu mi) and gross storage capacity is 41,759.00 km^{3} (10,018.52 cu mi).

== Purpose ==
- Irrigation
- Hydroelectricity
- Water supply

== See also ==
- Dams in Maharashtra
- List of reservoirs and dams in India
