= Rangawali Dam =

- Location within Maharashtra
- Official name: Rangawali Dam D01441
- Location: Dhule
- Coordinates: 21.0615337°N 73.8644314°E
- Opening date: 1982
- Owners: Government of Maharashtra, India

Dam and spillways
- Type of dam: Earthfill
- Impounds: Rangawali river
- Height: 25.63 m (84.1 ft)
- Length: 1,878 m (6,161 ft)
- Dam volume: 1,289 km^{3} (309 cu mi)

Reservoir
- Total capacity: 12,890 km^{3} (3,090 cu mi)
- Surface area: 329 km^{2} (127 sq mi)

Rangawali Dam, is an earthfill dam on Rangawali river near Dhule but in Nandurbar district in the state of Maharashtra in India.

== Specifications ==
The height of the dam above lowest foundation is 25.63 m (84.1 ft) while the length is 1,878 m (6,161 ft). The volume content is 1,289 km^{3} (309 cu mi) and gross storage capacity is 15,020.00 km^{3} (3,603.49 cu mi).

== Purpose ==
- Irrigation

== See also ==
- Dams in Maharashtra
- List of reservoirs and dams in India
