= Saikheda Dam =

- Location within Maharashtra
- Official name: Saikheda Dam D01247
- Location: Pandharkawada
- Coordinates: 20.1126815°N 78.4753418°E
- Opening date: 1972
- Owners: Government of Maharashtra, India

Dam and spillways
- Type of dam: Earthfill
- Impounds: Khuni river
- Height: 23.77 m (78.0 ft)
- Length: 1,740 m (5,710 ft)
- Dam volume: 909 km^{3} (218 cu mi)

Reservoir
- Total capacity: 27,184 km^{3} (6,522 cu mi)
- Surface area: 836 km^{2} (323 sq mi)

Saikheda Dam, is an earthfill dam on Khuni river near Pandharkawada, Yavatmal district in state of Maharashtra in India.Saikheda Dam was constructed as part of irrigation projects by Government of Maharashtra in the year 1972 . Nearest city to dam is Pandharkawada and the Dam is situated in Kelapur Taluka of Yavatmal District of Maharashtra . It is built on and impounds Khuni River, .

== Specifications ==
The height of the dam above lowest foundation is 23.77 m (78.0 ft) while the length is 1,740 m (5,710 ft). The volume content is 909 km^{3} (218 cu mi) and gross storage capacity is 38,511.00 km^{3} (9,239.28 cu mi).

== Purpose ==
- Irrigation

== See also ==
- Dams in Maharashtra
- List of reservoirs and dams in India
