= Kar Dam =

- Location within Maharashtra
- Official name: Kar Dam D03107
- Location: Wardha
- Coordinates: 21.2279°N 78.4526°E
- Opening date: 2000
- Owners: Government of Maharashtra, India

Dam and spillways
- Type of dam: Earthfill
- Impounds: Kar river
- Height: 25.13 m (82.4 ft)
- Length: 1,067 m (3,501 ft)
- Dam volume: 265.06 km^{3} (63.59 cu mi)

Reservoir
- Total capacity: 21,060 km^{3} (5,050 cu mi)
- Surface area: 4,480 km^{2} (1,730 sq mi)

Kar Dam, is an earthfill dam on Kar river near Wardha in state of Maharashtra in India.

== Specifications ==
The height of the dam above lowest foundation is 25.13 m (82.4 ft) while the length is 1,067 m (3,501 ft). The volume content is 265.06 km^{3} (63.59 cu mi) and gross storage capacity is 25,960.00 km^{3} (6,228.14 cu mi).

In 2023 dam fenced for preventing people to do not swim in shock absorber tank.

== Purpose ==
- Irrigation

== See also ==
- Dams in Maharashtra
- List of reservoirs and dams in India
