= Vadiwale Dam =

- Location within Maharashtra
- Official name: Vadiwale Dam D03047
- Location: Maval
- Coordinates: 18.824661°N 73.5100365°E
- Opening date: 1999
- Owners: Government of Maharashtra, India

Dam and spillways
- Type of dam: Earthfill
- Impounds: Kundali river
- Height: 29 m (95 ft)
- Length: 485.64 m (1,593.3 ft)
- Dam volume: 8.73 km^{3} (2.09 cu mi)

Reservoir
- Total capacity: 30,390 km^{3} (7,290 cu mi)
- Surface area: 3,558 km^{2} (1,374 sq mi)

Vadiwale Dam, is an earthfill dam on Kundali river near Maval, Pune district in the state of Maharashtra in India.

== Specifications ==
The height of the dam above its lowest foundation is 29 m (95 ft) while the length is 485.64 m (1,593.3 ft). The volume content is 8.73 km^{3} (2.09 cu mi) and gross storage capacity is 40,870.00 km^{3} (9,805.23 cu mi).

== Purpose ==
- Irrigation

== See also ==
- Dams in Maharashtra
- List of reservoirs and dams in India
