= Kalyan Dam =

- Location within Maharashtra
- Official name: Kalyan Dam D01437
- Location: Jalna
- Coordinates: 19.8519095°N 76.028204°E
- Opening date: 1986
- Owners: Government of Maharashtra, India

Dam and spillways
- Type of dam: Earthfill
- Impounds: Kalyan river
- Height: 16.49 m (54.1 ft)
- Length: 1,554 m (5,098 ft)
- Dam volume: 492 km^{3} (118 cu mi)

Reservoir
- Total capacity: 10,360 km^{3} (2,490 cu mi)
- Surface area: 533 km^{2} (206 sq mi)

Kalyan Dam, is an earthfill dam on Kalyan river near Jalna in the state of Maharashtra in India.

== Specifications ==
The height of the dam above lowest foundation is 16.49 m (54.1 ft) while the length is 1,554 m (5,098 ft). The volume content is 492 km^{3} (118 cu mi) and gross storage capacity is 15,360.00 km^{3} (3,685.06 cu mi).

== Purpose ==
- Irrigation

== See also ==
- Dams in Maharashtra
- List of reservoirs and dams in India
