= Chandai Dam =

- Location within Maharashtra
- Official name: Chandai Dam D01387
- Location: Varora
- Coordinates: 20.4220605°N 79.2210841°E
- Opening date: 1983
- Owners: Government of Maharashtra, India

Dam and spillways
- Type of dam: Earthfill
- Impounds: Chandai Nalla river
- Height: 11.91 m (39.1 ft)
- Length: 1,830 m (6,000 ft)
- Dam volume: 181 km^{3} (43 cu mi)

Reservoir
- Total capacity: 10,690 km^{3} (2,560 cu mi)
- Surface area: 523 km^{2} (202 sq mi)

Chandai Dam, is an earthfill dam on Chandai Nalla river near Varora, Chandrapur district in the state of Maharashtra in India.

== Specifications ==
The height of the dam above lowest foundation is 11.91 m (39.1 ft) while the length is 1,830 m (6,000 ft). The volume content is 181 km^{3} (43 cu mi) and gross storage capacity is 13,200.00 km^{3} (3,166.85 cu mi).

== Purpose ==
- Irrigation

== See also ==
- Dams in Maharashtra
- List of reservoirs and dams in India
