= Bhavali Dam =

- Location within Maharashtra
- Official name: Bhavali Dam
- Location: Igatpuri
- Coordinates: 19.6350691°N 73.5906315°E
- Owners: Government of Maharashtra, India

Dam and spillways
- Type of dam: Earthfill
- Impounds: Bham river
- Height: 33.97 m (111.5 ft)
- Length: 1,550 m (5,090 ft)
- Dam volume: 329 km^{3} (79 cu mi)

Reservoir
- Total capacity: 69,760 km^{3} (16,740 cu mi)
- Surface area: 4,980 km^{2} (1,920 sq mi)

Bhavali Dam, is an earthfill dam on Bham river near Igatpuri, Nashik district in state of Maharashtra in India. Bhavali Dam is located near village Bhavali on Darana river tributary of Godavari river.

== Specifications ==
The height of the dam above lowest foundation is 33.97 m (111.5 ft) while the length is 1,550 m (5,090 ft). The volume content is 329 km^{3} (79 cu mi) and gross storage capacity is 75,050.00 km^{3} (18,005.45 cu mi).

== Purpose ==
- Irrigation

== See also ==
- Dams in Maharashtra
- List of reservoirs and dams in India
