= Mas Dam =

- Location within Maharashtra
- Official name: Mas Dam D01424
- Location: Khamgaon
- Coordinates: 20.6027091°N 76.6624368°E
- Opening date: 1932
- Owners: Government of Maharashtra, India

Dam and spillways
- Type of dam: Earthfill
- Impounds: Mas river
- Height: 17.71 m (58.1 ft)
- Length: 663 m (2,175 ft)
- Dam volume: 399 km^{3} (96 cu mi)

Reservoir
- Total capacity: 15,040 km^{3} (3,610 cu mi)
- Surface area: 4,810 km^{2} (1,860 sq mi)

Mas Dam, is an earthfill dam on the Mas river near Khamgaon, Buldhana district in the Indian State of Maharashtra. It is largely used for irrigation purposes.

== Specifications ==
The height of the dam above the lowest foundation is 17.71 m (58.1 ft) while the length is 663 m (2,175 ft). The volume content is 399 km^{3} (96 cu mi) and the gross storage capacity is 17,500.00 km^{3} (4,198.47 cu mi).

== See also ==
- Dams in Maharashtra
- List of reservoirs and dams in India
