= Alwandi Dam =

- Location within Maharashtra
- Official name: Alwandi Dam
- Location: Igatpuri
- Coordinates: 19.8161292°N 73.5746026°E
- Opening date: 1976
- Owners: Government of Maharashtra, India

Dam and spillways
- Type of dam: Earthfill
- Impounds: Vaitarna river
- Height: 37.8 m (124 ft)
- Length: 2,548 m (8,360 ft)
- Dam volume: 930 km^{3} (220 cu mi)

Reservoir
- Total capacity: 331,110 km^{3} (79,440 cu mi)
- Surface area: 37,130 km^{2} (14,340 sq mi)

Alwandi Dam, is an earthfill dam on Vaitarna river near Igatpuri, Nashik district in state of Maharashtra in India.

== Specifications ==
The height of the dam above lowest foundation is 37.8 m (124 ft) while the length is 2,548 m (8,360 ft). The volume content is 930 km^{3} (220 cu mi) and gross storage capacity is 353,750.00 km^{3} (84,869.14 cu mi).

== Purpose ==
- Irrigation

== See also ==
- Dams in Maharashtra
- List of reservoirs and dams in India
