= Pentakali Dam =

- Location within Maharashtra
- Official name: Pentakali Dam D03109
- Location: Mehkar
- Coordinates: 20.2706815°N 76.4749182°E
- Opening date: 2003
- Owners: Government of Maharashtra, India

Dam and spillways
- Type of dam: Earthfill
- Impounds: Penganga river
- Height: 27.5 m (90 ft)
- Length: 990 m (3,250 ft)
- Dam volume: 694,350 m^{3} (24,521,000 cu ft)

Reservoir
- Total capacity: 59,976,000 m^{3} (2.1180×10^{9} cu ft)
- Surface area: 12,870,000 m^{2} (138,500,000 sq ft)

Pentakali Dam, is an earthfill dam on Penganga river near Mehkar, Buldhana बुलढाणा जिल्हा विदर्भ district in the state of Maharashtra in India.

== Specifications ==
The height of the dam above lowest foundation is 27.5 m (90 ft) while the length is 990 m (3,250 ft). The volume content is 694,350 m^{3} (24,521,000 cu ft) and gross storage capacity is 67,355,000 m^{3} (2.3786×10^{9} cu ft).

== Purpose ==
- Irrigation

== See also ==
- Dams in Maharashtra
- List of reservoirs and dams in India
