= Upper Kadwa Dam =

- Official name: Upper Kadwa Dam
- Location: Nandgaon
- Demolition date: N/A
- Owners: Government of Maharashtra, India

Dam and spillways
- Type of dam: Earthfill
- Impounds: Manyad river
- Height: 32.92 m (108.0 ft)
- Length: 1,470 m (4,820 ft)
- Dam volume: 471.66 km^{3} (113.16 cu mi)

Reservoir
- Total capacity: 9,460 km^{3} (2,270 cu mi)
- Surface area: 238 km^{2} (92 sq mi)

Upper Kadwa Dam, is an earthfill dam on Manyad river near Nandgaon in the state of Maharashtra in India.

== Specifications ==
The height of the dam above its lowest foundation is 32.92 m (108.0 ft) while the length is 1,470 m (4,820 ft). The volume content is 471.66 km^{3} (113.16 cu mi) and gross storage capacity is 14,010.00 km^{3} (3,361.18 cu mi).

== Purpose ==
- Irrigation

== See also ==
- Dams in Maharashtra
- List of reservoirs and dams in India
