= Godavari Dam =

- Official name: Godavari Dam
- Location: Igatpuri
- Owners: Government of Maharashtra, India

Dam and spillways
- Type of dam: Earthfill
- Impounds: Darna river
- Height: 34.75 m (114.0 ft)
- Length: 1,028 m (3,373 ft)

Reservoir
- Total capacity: 40,790 km^{3} (9,790 cu mi)
- Surface area: 2,565 km^{2} (990 sq mi)

Godavari Dam, is an earthfill dam on Darna river near Igatpuri in state of Maharashtra in India.

== Specifications ==
The height of the dam above lowest foundation is 34.75 m (114.0 ft) while the length is 1,028 m (3,373 ft). The volume content is 3,007 km^{3} (721 cu mi) and gross storage capacity is 46,730.00 km^{3} (11,211.12 cu mi).

== Purpose ==
- Irrigation

== See also ==
- Dams in Maharashtra
- List of reservoirs and dams in India
