= Wakod Dam =

- Location within Maharashtra
- Official name: Wakod Dam D03130
- Location: Aurangabad
- Coordinates: 20.166672°N 75.497017°E
- Demolition date: N/A
- Owners: Government of Maharashtra, India

Dam and spillways
- Type of dam: Earthfill
- Impounds: Nagzari river
- Height: 14.28 m (46.9 ft)
- Length: 2,975 m (9,760 ft)
- Dam volume: 577 km^{3} (138 cu mi)

Reservoir
- Total capacity: 11,400 km^{3} (2,700 cu mi)
- Surface area: 4,480 km^{2} (1,730 sq mi)

Wakod Dam, is an earthfill dam on Nagzari river near Aurangabad in the state of Maharashtra in India.

== Specifications ==
The height of the dam above its lowest foundation is 14.28 m (46.9 ft) while the length is 2,975 m (9,760 ft). The volume content is 577 km^{3} (138 cu mi) and gross storage capacity is 12,050.00 km^{3} (2,890.95 cu mi).

== Purpose ==
- Irrigation

== See also ==
- Dams in Maharashtra
- List of reservoirs and dams in India
