= Karwappa Dam =

- Location within Maharashtra
- Official name: Karwappa Dam D03053
- Location: Gadchiroli
- Coordinates: 20.1357767°N 80.1857711°E
- Owners: Government of Maharashtra, India

Dam and spillways
- Type of dam: Earthfill
- Impounds: Karwappa river
- Height: 35 m (115 ft)
- Length: 1,416 m (4,646 ft)
- Dam volume: 991 km^{3} (238 cu mi)

Reservoir
- Total capacity: 32,560 km^{3} (7,810 cu mi)
- Surface area: 4,454 km^{2} (1,720 sq mi)

Karwappa Dam, is an earthfill dam on Karwappa river near Gadchiroli in state of Maharashtra in India.

== Specifications ==
The height of the dam above lowest foundation is 35 m (115 ft) while the length is 1,416 m (4,646 ft). The volume content is 991 km^{3} (238 cu mi) and gross storage capacity is 32,560.00 km^{3} (7,811.56 cu mi).

== Purpose ==
- Irrigation

== See also ==
- Dams in Maharashtra
- List of reservoirs and dams in India
