= Prakasha Barrage Dam =

- Interactive map of Prakasha Barrage Dam
- Official name: Prakasha Barrage Dam
- Location: Nandurbar
- Construction began: April 1999
- Opening date: 2009-10
- Construction cost: 178.91 crore
- Owners: Government of Maharashtra, India

Dam and spillways
- Type of dam: Earthfill
- Impounds: Tapi River
- Height: 39.5 m (130 ft)
- Length: 1,070 m (3,510 ft)
- Dam volume: 179 km^{3} (43 cu mi)

Reservoir
- Total capacity: 248,210 km^{3} (59,550 cu mi)
- Surface area: 3,850 km^{2} (1,490 sq mi)

Prakasha Barrage Dam, is an earthfill dam on Tapi river in Nandurbar district of Maharashtra in India.

== Specifications ==
The height of the dam above lowest foundation is 39.5 m (130 ft) while the length is 1,070 m (3,510 ft). The volume content is 179 km^{3} (43 cu mi) and gross storage capacity is 325,000.00 km^{3} (77,971.65 cu mi).

== Purpose ==
- Irrigation

== See also ==
- Dams in Maharashtra
- List of reservoirs and dams in India
