= Lower Wunna Dam =

Lower Wunna (Nand) Dam
- Location within Maharashtra
- Official name: Lower Wunna (Nand) Dam
- Location: Nagpur
- Coordinates: 20.8400122°N 79.0529414°E
- Opening date: 1997
- Owners: Government of Maharashtra, India

Dam and spillways
- Type of dam: Earthfill; Gravity
- Impounds: Nand river
- Height: 16.25 m (53.3 ft)
- Length: 2,513 m (8,245 ft)
- Dam volume: 1,833 km^{3} (440 cu mi)

Reservoir
- Total capacity: 53,182 km^{3} (12,759 cu mi)
- Surface area: 21,642 km^{2} (8,356 sq mi)

Lower Wunna (Nand) Dam (also called Wadgaon Dam) is an earthfill and gravity dam on Nand river near Nagpur in state of Maharashtra in India.

== Specifications ==
The height of the dam above lowest foundation is 16.25 m (53.3 ft) while the length is 2,513 m (8,245 ft). The volume content is 1,833 km^{3} (440 cu mi) and gross storage capacity is 62,182.00 km^{3} (14,918.26 cu mi).

== Purpose ==
- Irrigation

== See also ==
- Dams in Maharashtra
- List of reservoirs and dams in India
