= Pakadiguddam Dam =

- Location within Maharashtra
- Official name: Pakadiguddam Dam D02926
- Location: Kargaon Ta.Korpana Dist. Chandrapur
- Coordinates: 19.6917283°N 79.0480042°E
- Opening date: 1993
- Owners: Government of Maharashtra, India

Dam and spillways
- Type of dam: Earthfill
- Impounds: Devghat river
- Height: 19 m (62 ft)
- Length: 1,814 m (5,951 ft)
- Dam volume: 1,067 km^{3} (256 cu mi)

Reservoir
- Total capacity: 11,800 km^{3} (2,800 cu mi)
- Surface area: 2,579 km^{2} (996 sq mi)

Pakadiguddam Dam, is an earthfill dam on Devghat river near Korpana in the state of Maharashtra in India.

== Specifications ==
The height of the dam above lowest foundation is 19 m (62 ft) while the length is 1,814 m (5,951 ft). The volume content is 1,067 km^{3} (256 cu mi) and gross storage capacity is 13,307.00 km^{3} (3,192.52 cu mi).

== Purpose ==
- Irrigation

पकडीगुड्म हा मध्यम सिंचन प्रकल्प आहे. सदर प्रकल्प कोरपना तालुक्यात आहे.

== See also ==
- Dams in Maharashtra
- List of reservoirs and dams in India
