= Panzara Dam =

- Location within Maharashtra
- Official name: Panzara Dam D01241
- Location: Sakri
- Coordinates: 20.9312291°N 74.098995°E
- Opening date: 1973
- Owners: Government of Maharashtra, India

Dam and spillways
- Type of dam: Earthfill
- Impounds: Panzara river
- Height: 33.5 m (110 ft)
- Length: 1,430 m (4,690 ft)
- Dam volume: 1,597 km^{3} (383 cu mi)

Reservoir
- Total capacity: 35,800 km^{3} (8,600 cu mi)
- Surface area: 5,590 km^{2} (2,160 sq mi)

Panzara Dam, is an earthfill dam on Panzara river near Sakri, Dhule district in the state of Maharashtra in India.

== Specifications ==
The height of the dam above lowest foundation is 33.5 m (110 ft) while the length is 1,430 m (4,690 ft). The volume content is 1,597 km^{3} (383 cu mi) and gross storage capacity is 43,500.00 km^{3} (10,436.20 cu mi).

== Purpose ==
- Irrigation

== See also ==
- Dams in Maharashtra
- List of reservoirs and dams in India
