= Adol Dam =

Dam in India

- Location within Maharashtra
- Official name: Adol Dam
- Location: Borala
- Coordinates: 20°06′00″N 76°59′00″E
- Opening date: 1990
- Owners: Government of Maharashtra, India

Dam and spillways
- Type of dam: Earthfill
- Impounds: Adola river
- Height: 18.47 m (60.6 ft)
- Length: 1,725 m (5,659 ft)
- Dam volume: 440 km^{3} (110 cu mi)

Reservoir
- Total capacity: 0 km^{3} (0 cu mi)
- Surface area: 3,141 km^{2} (1,213 sq mi)

Adol Dam is an earthfill dam on Adola river near Borala in Washim district in the state of Maharashtra, India.

== Specifications ==
The height of the dam above lowest foundation is 18.47 m (60.6 ft) while the length is 1,725 m (5,659 ft). The volume content is 479 km^{3} (115 cu mi) and gross storage capacity is 15,270.00 km^{3} (3,663.47 cu mi).

== Purpose ==
- Irrigation

== See also ==
- Dams in Maharashtra
- List of reservoirs and dams in India
