= Khairi Dam =

- Location within Maharashtra
- Official name: Khairi Dam D02858
- Location: Jamkhed
- Coordinates: 18.6070621°N 75.433191°E
- Opening date: 1989
- Owners: Government of Maharashtra, India

Dam and spillways
- Type of dam: Earthfill
- Impounds: Kar river
- Height: 18.91 m (62.0 ft)
- Length: 1,210 m (3,970 ft)
- Dam volume: 54 km^{3} (13 cu mi)

Reservoir
- Total capacity: 13,743 km^{3} (3,297 cu mi)
- Surface area: 492 km^{2} (190 sq mi)

Khairi Dam is an earthfill dam on the Kar river near Jamkhed, Ahmednagar district in the state of Maharashtra in India.

== Specifications ==
The height of the dam above lowest foundation is 18.91 m (62.0 ft) while the length is 1,210 m (3,970 ft). The volume content is 54 km^{3} (13 cu mi) and gross storage capacity is 15,110.00 km^{3} (3,625.08 cu mi).

== Purpose ==
The main purpose of the dam is irrigation for the surrounding area, with water from the resulting spillway and reservoir.

== See also ==
- Dams in Maharashtra
- List of reservoirs and dams in India
