= Bhojapur Dam =

- Location within Maharashtra
- Official name: Bhojapur Dam
- Location: Sinnar
- Coordinates: 19°40′51″N 74°3′15″E
- Opening date: 1972
- Owners: Government of Maharashtra, India Built in the time of B J Khatal Patil.

Dam and spillways
- Type of dam: Earthfill
- Impounds: Mahalungi river
- Height: 32.41 m (106.3 ft)
- Length: 733 m (2,405 ft)
- Dam volume: 449 km^{3} (108 cu mi)

Reservoir
- Total capacity: 10,700 km^{3} (2,600 cu mi)
- Surface area: 3,352 km^{2} (1,294 sq mi)

Bhojapur Dam is an earth fill dam on the Mahalungi River near Sinnar, Nashik district in the state of Maharashtra in India. The dam's location is near Chas village. The Mahalungi River joins the Pravara River in Sangamner.

== Specifications ==
The height of the dam above the lowest foundation is 32.41 m (106.3 ft) while the length is 733 m (2,405 ft). The volume is 449 km^{3} (108 cu mi) and gross storage capacity is 13,730.00 km^{3} (3,294.00 cu mi).

== Purpose ==
- Irrigation

== See also ==
- Dams in Maharashtra
- List of reservoirs and dams in India
