= Kundlika Dam =

- Location within Maharashtra
- Official name: Kundlika Dam D02850
- Location: Majalgaon
- Coordinates: 18.940163°N 76.1273736°E
- Opening date: 1986
- Owners: Government of Maharashtra, India

Dam and spillways
- Type of dam: Earthfill
- Impounds: Kundlika river
- Height: 28.45 m (93.3 ft)
- Length: 1,403 m (4,603 ft)
- Dam volume: 0 km^{3} (0 cu mi)

Reservoir
- Total capacity: 0 km^{3} (0 cu mi)
- Surface area: 6,850 km^{2} (2,640 sq mi)

Kundlika Dam, is an earthfill dam on Kundlika river near Majalgaon in state of Maharashtra in India.

== Specifications ==
The height of the dam above lowest foundation is 28.45 m (93.3 ft) while the length is 1,403 m (4,603 ft). The volume content is 0 km^{3} (0 cu mi) and gross storage capacity is 46,350.00 km^{3} (11,119.96 cu mi).

== Purpose ==
- Irrigation

== See also ==
- Dams in Maharashtra
- List of reservoirs and dams in India
