= Januna Dam =

- Location within Maharashtra
- Official name: Januna Dam D04004
- Location: Barshi Takali
- Coordinates: 20.4784941°N 77.0372821°E
- Opening date: 1978
- Owners: Government of Maharashtra, India

Dam and spillways
- Type of dam: Earthfill
- Impounds: local river
- Height: 11.95 m (39.2 ft)
- Length: 390 m (1,280 ft)
- Dam volume: 150,000 m^{3} (5,300,000 cu ft)

Reservoir
- Total capacity: 11,800 m^{3} (420,000 cu ft)
- Surface area: 404,000 m^{2} (4,350,000 sq ft)

Januna Dam, is an earthfill dam on local river near Barshi Takali, Akola district in the state of Maharashtra in India.

== Specifications ==
The height of the dam above lowest foundation is 11.95 m (39.2 ft) while the length is 390 m (1,280 ft). The volume content is 150,000 m^{3} (5,300,000 cu ft) and gross storage capacity is 11,310,000 m^{3} (399,000,000 cu ft).

== Purpose ==
- Irrigation

== See also ==
- Dams in Maharashtra
- List of reservoirs and dams in India
