= Bham Dam =

Bham dam
- Location within Maharashtra
- Official name: Bham dam
- Location: Igatpuri
- Coordinates: 19°39′33″N 73°38′43″E
- Construction began: 2007
- Owners: Government of Maharashtra, India

Dam and spillways
- Type of dam: Earthfill; Gravity
- Impounds: Godavari river
- Height: 33.97 m (111.5 ft)
- Length: 1,550 m (5,090 ft)

Reservoir
- Creates: Bham reservoir
- Total capacity: 75.42×10^{6} m^{3} (2.663×10^{9} cu ft)
- Catchment area: 50.5×10^{6} m^{2} (544×10^{6} sq ft)
- Surface area: 4.7×10^{6} m^{2} (51×10^{6} sq ft)

Bham dam is an earthfill gravity dam on the Bham tributary of Godavari river in Nashik district in the State of Maharashtra in India.

== Specifications ==
The height of the dam above its lowest foundation is 33.97 m (111.5 ft) while the length is 1,550 m (5,090 ft). The live storage capacity is 69.76×10^{6} m^{3} (2.464×10^{9} cu ft).

== Purpose ==
Irrigation

== See also ==
- Dams in Maharashtra
- List of reservoirs and dams in India
