= Kelzar Dam =

- Location within Maharashtra
- Official name: Kelzar Dam D01353
- Location: Satana
- Coordinates: 20.6517497°N 73.9733719°E
- Opening date: 1981
- Owners: Government of Maharashtra, India

Dam and spillways
- Type of dam: Earthfill
- Impounds: Aram river
- Height: 32.5 m (107 ft)
- Length: 1,236 m (4,055 ft)
- Dam volume: 1,622 km^{3} (389 cu mi)

Reservoir
- Total capacity: 16,210 km^{3} (3,890 cu mi)
- Surface area: 1,660 km^{2} (640 sq mi)

Kelzar Dam, is an earthfill dam on Aram river near Satana, Nashik district in the state of Maharashtra in India.

== Specifications ==
The height of the dam above lowest foundation is 32.5 m (107 ft) while the length is 1,236 m (4,055 ft). The volume content is 1,622 km^{3} (389 cu mi) and gross storage capacity is 17,100.00 km^{3} (4,102.51 cu mi).

== Purpose ==
- Irrigation

== See also ==
- Dams in Maharashtra
- List of reservoirs and dams in India
