= Khandeshar Dam =

- Location within Maharashtra
- Official name: Khandeshar Dam D04146
- Location: O'bad
- Coordinates: 18.5038042°N 75.4249352°E
- Opening date: 1978
- Owners: Government of Maharashtra, India

Dam and spillways
- Type of dam: Earthfill
- Impounds: Vali river
- Height: 17.14 m (56.2 ft)
- Length: 1,257 m (4,124 ft)
- Dam volume: 305 km^{3} (73 cu mi)

Reservoir
- Total capacity: 8,820 km^{3} (2,120 cu mi)
- Surface area: 3,000 km^{2} (1,200 sq mi)

Khandeshar Dam, is an earthfill dam on Vali river near Osmanabad in state of Maharashtra in India.

== Specifications ==
The height of the dam above lowest foundation is 17.14 m (56.2 ft) while the length is 1,257 m (4,124 ft). The volume content is 305 km^{3} (73 cu mi) and gross storage capacity is 10,840.00 km^{3} (2,600.65 cu mi).

== Purpose ==
- Irrigation

== See also ==
- Dams in Maharashtra
- List of reservoirs and dams in India
