= Dhamni Dam =

Dhamni (Surya) Dam
- Location within Maharashtra
- Official name: Dhamni (Surya) Dam D02997
- Location: Dhamni
- Coordinates: 19.925122°N 73.060799°E
- Opening date: 1990
- Owners: Government of Maharashtra, India

Dam and spillways
- Type of dam: Earthfill
- Impounds: Surya river
- Height: 59 m (194 ft)
- Length: 1,563 m (5,128 ft)
- Dam volume: 1,270 km^{3} (300 cu mi)

Reservoir
- Total capacity: 273,350 km^{3} (65,580 cu mi)
- Surface area: 16,130 km^{2} (6,230 sq mi)

Dhamni (Surya) Dam, is an earthfill dam on Surya River near Dhamni, Palghar district in the state of Gujarat

== Specifications ==
The height of the dam above lowest foundation is 59 m (194 ft) while the length is 1,563 m (5,128 ft). The volume content is 1,270 km^{3} (300 cu mi) and gross storage capacity is 285,310.00 km^{3} (68,449.51 cu mi).

== Purpose ==
- Irrigation
- Hydroelectricity

Surya Hydroelectric Project was commissioned in 1999 by Government of Maharashtra and then Handed over to MAHAGENCO (then MSEB) in May 2002. The plant's capacity is 6 MW, generated by one Vertical shaft Kaplan turbine, manufactured by BHEL.

== See also ==
- Dams in Maharashtra
- List of reservoirs and dams in India
