= Alandi Dam =

- Location within Maharashtra
- Official name: Alandi Dam
- Location: Nasik
- Coordinates: 20.1431692°N 73.7143994°E
- Opening date: 1983
- Owners: Government of Maharashtra, India

Dam and spillways
- Type of dam: Earthfill
- Impounds: Alandi river
- Height: 29.3 m (96 ft)
- Length: 1,690 m (5,540 ft)
- Dam volume: 2,782,000 m^{3} (98,200,000 cu ft)

Reservoir
- Total capacity: 2,782,000 m^{3} (98,200,000 cu ft)
- Surface area: 1.559 km^{2} (0.602 sq mi)

Alandi Dam, is an earthfill dam on Alandi river in Nashik district in state of Maharashtra in India.

== Specifications ==
The height of the dam above lowest foundation is 29.3 m (96 ft) while the length is 1,690 m (5,540 ft). The volume content is 2,782,000 m^{3} (98,200,000 cu ft) and gross storage capacity is 2,960,000 m^{3} (105,000,000 cu ft).

== Purpose ==
- Irrigation

== See also ==
- Dams in Maharashtra
- List of reservoirs and dams in India
