= Purmepeda Dam =

- Location within Maharashtra
- Official name: Purmepeda Dam D04657
- Location: Dhule, Maharashtra, India
- Coordinates: 20.7316°N 74.6850°E
- Opening date: 1955
- Owners: Government of Maharashtra, India

Dam and spillways
- Type of dam: Earthfill
- Impounds: Bori river
- Height: 24.7 m (81 ft)
- Length: 1,500 m (4,900 ft)
- Dam volume: 525 km^{3} (126 cu mi)

Reservoir
- Total capacity: 13,550.00 km^{3} (3,250.82 cu mi)
- Surface area: 303 km^{2} (117 sq mi)

Purmepeda Dam is an earthfill dam on Bori river near Dhule in the Indian state of Maharashtra.

== Specifications ==
The height of the dam above lowest foundation is 24.7 m (81 ft) while the length is 1,500 m (4,900 ft). The volume content is 525 km^{3} (126 cu mi) and gross storage capacity is 13,550.00 km^{3} (3,250.82 cu mi).

== Purpose ==
- Irrigation

== See also ==
- Dams in Maharashtra
- List of reservoirs and dams in India
