= Punegaon Dam =

- Location within Maharashtra
- Official name: Punegaon Dam D02972
- Location: Punegaon, Vani
- Coordinates: 20.3598764°N 73.8346913°E
- Construction began: 1995
- Opening date: 1998
- Owners: Government of Maharashtra, India

Dam and spillways
- Type of dam: Earthfill
- Impounds: Unanda river
- Height: 24.14 m (79.2 ft)
- Length: 1,803 m (5,915 ft)
- Dam volume: 991 km^{3} (238 cu mi)
- Spillway type: Flood Gates

Reservoir
- Total capacity: 17,750 km^{3} (4,260 cu mi)
- Surface area: 3,646 km^{2} (1,408 sq mi)

Punegaon Dam, is an earthfill dam on Unanda river near Punegaon, Vani, Nashik district in the state of Maharashtra in India.

== Specifications ==
The height of the dam above lowest foundation is 24.14 m (79.2 ft) while the length is 1,803 m (5,915 ft). The volume content is 991 km^{3} (238 cu mi) and gross storage capacity is 20,399.00 km^{3} (4,893.98 cu mi).

== Purpose ==
- Irrigation

It is used for irrigational purposes . The canal of the dam supplies water to the dry regions of Yeola taluka through the Punegaon- Daraswadi water canal.

== River ==
The dam was constructed on Unanda River and was completed in 1998. It has three flood gates which are opened when the dam is filled with full capacity.

The water is released in the river and further goes to Ozarkhed Dam situated on the same river.

== Manjarpada Tunnel Project ==
The dam supplies water for the dry regions of Yeola taluka. The water is planned to come through a 9.6 km tunnel from the Manjarpada Dam which is being constructed for the project.

This project will help with water for various purposes in the various dry villages.

== See also ==
- Dams in Maharashtra
- List of reservoirs and dams in India
