= Punad Dam =

- Location within Maharashtra
- Official name: Punad Dam D03013
- Location: Nashik
- Coordinates: 20.6153124°N 73.947022°E
- Owners: Government of Maharashtra, India

Dam and spillways
- Type of dam: Earthfill
- Impounds: Punand river
- Height: 29.62 m (97.2 ft)
- Length: 1,820 m (5,970 ft)
- Dam volume: 123 km^{3} (30 cu mi)

Reservoir
- Total capacity: 17,290 km^{3} (4,150 cu mi)
- Surface area: 2,202 km^{2} (850 sq mi)

Punad Dam is an earthfill dam on Punand river for irrigation near Nashik, Maharashtra, India.

== Specifications ==
The height of the dam above lowest foundation is 29.62 m (97.2 ft) while the length is 1,820 m (5,970 ft). The volume content is 123 km^{3} (30 cu mi) and gross storage capacity is 19,080.00 km^{3} (4,577.54 cu mi).

== See also ==
- Dams in Maharashtra
- List of reservoirs and dams in India
