= Wunna Dam =

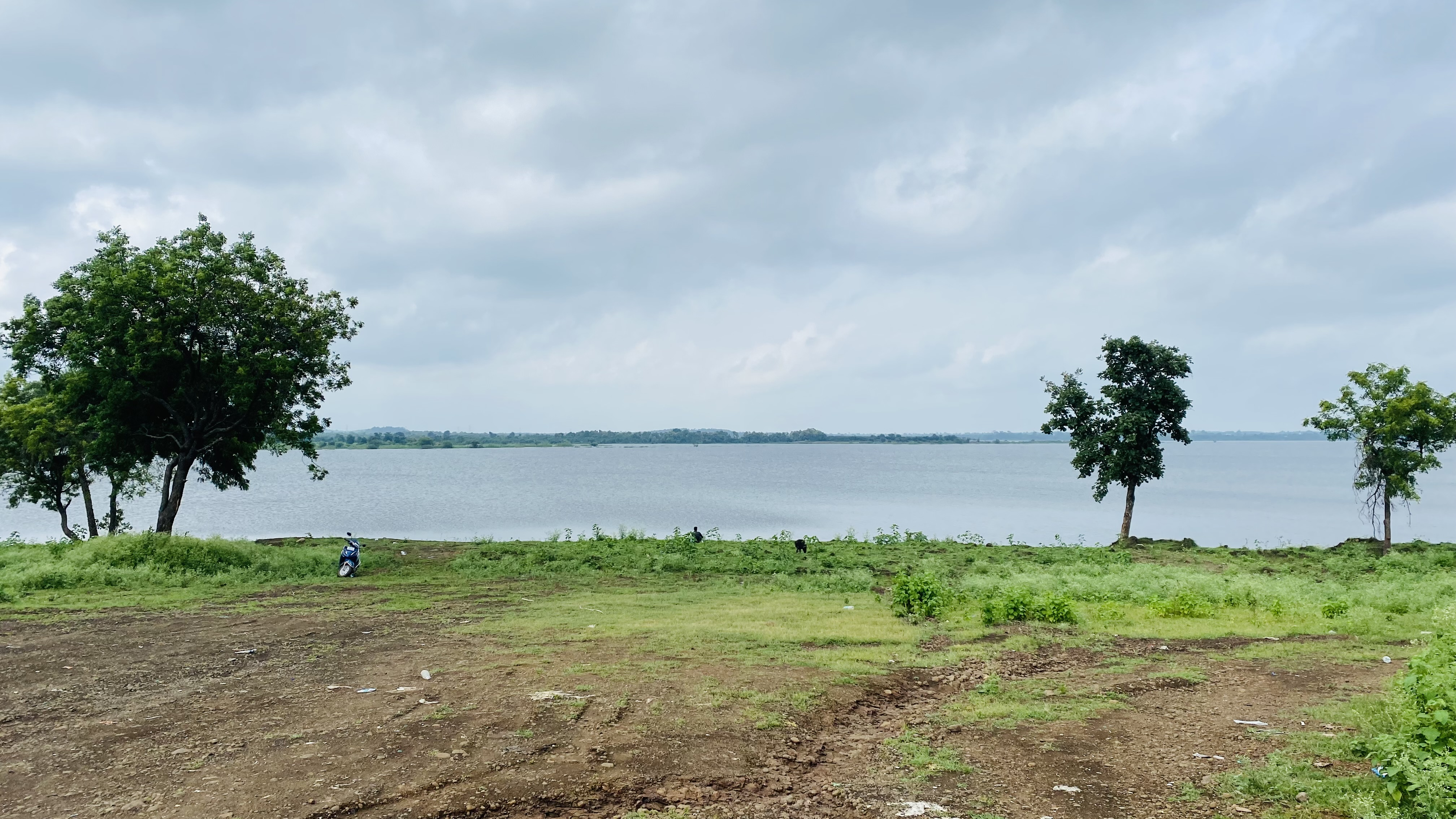
- Interactive map of Wunna Dam
- Official name: Wunna Dam
- Location: Nagpur
- Opening date: 1966
- Owners: Government of Maharashtra, India

Dam and spillways
- Type of dam: Earthfill
- Impounds: Wunna river
- Height: 18.18 m (59.6 ft)
- Length: 2,525 m (8,284 ft)
- Dam volume: 390 km^{3} (94 cu mi)

Reservoir
- Total capacity: 21,640 km^{3} (5,190 cu mi)
- Surface area: 569 km^{2} (220 sq mi)

Wunna Dam is an earthfill dam on Wunna river near Nagpur in the state of Maharashtra in India.

== Specifications ==
The height of the dam above its lowest foundation is 18.18 m (59.6 ft) while the length is 2,525 m (8,284 ft). The volume content is 390 km^{3} (94 cu mi) and gross storage capacity is 23,560.00 km^{3} (5,652.34 cu mi).

== Purpose ==
- Irrigation

== See also ==
- Dams in Maharashtra
- List of reservoirs and dams in India
