= Amalocalalla Dam =

Amalnala dam
- Location within Maharashtra
- Official name: Amalnalla Dam
- Location: Manoli Ta.Rajura near. Gadchandur Ta.Korpana
- Coordinates: 19.6995°N 79.1639°E
- Opening date: 1985
- Owners: Government of Maharashtra, India

Dam and spillways
- Type of dam: Earthfill
- Impounds: Amalnalla river
- Height: 37.75 m (123.9 ft)
- Length: 1,607 m (5,272 ft)
- Dam volume: 133.4 km^{3} (32.0 cu mi)

Reservoir
- Total capacity: 21,200 km^{3} (5,100 cu mi)
- Surface area: 3,703 km^{2} (1,430 sq mi)

Amalnalla Dam, (Marathi: अमलनाला धरण) is an earthfill dam on Amalnalla river near Gadchandur Ta.Korpana Chandrapur district in state of Maharashtra in India.

== Specifications ==
The height of the dam above lowest foundation is 37.75 m (123.9 ft) while the length is 1,607 m (5,272 ft). The volume content is 133.4 km^{3} (32.0 cu mi) and gross storage capacity is 22,700.00 km^{3} (5,446.02 cu mi).

== Purpose ==
- Irrigation

== See also ==
- Dams in Maharashtra
- List of reservoirs and dams in India
