= Chargad Dam =

Dam in Maharashtra, India

- Location within Maharashtra
- Official name: Chargad Dam D03542
- Location: Amravati
- Coordinates: 21.3712444°N 77.8175354°E
- Opening date: 2003
- Owners: Government of Maharashtra, India

Dam and spillways
- Type of dam: Earthfill
- Impounds: Chargad river
- Height: 24.5 m (80 ft)
- Length: 3,740 m (12,270 ft)
- Dam volume: 1,095 km^{3} (263 cu mi)

Reservoir
- Total capacity: 8,266 km^{3} (1,983 cu mi)
- Surface area: 2,842 km^{2} (1,097 sq mi)

Chargad Dam, is an earthfill dam on Chargad river near Amravati in state of Maharashtra in India.

== Specifications ==
The height of the dam above lowest foundation is 24.5 m (80 ft) while the length is 3,740 m (12,270 ft). The volume content is 1,095 km^{3} (263 cu mi) and gross storage capacity is 12,005.00 km^{3} (2,880.15 cu mi).

== Purpose ==
- Irrigation
- Water Supply

== See also ==
- Dams in Maharashtra
- List of reservoirs and dams in India
