= Chandpur Dam =

Dam in Maharashtra, India

- Location within Maharashtra
- Official name: Chandpur Dam D00989
- Location: Tumsar
- Coordinates: 21.5184338°N 79.8104462°E
- Opening date: 1915
- Owners: Government of Maharashtra, India

Dam and spillways
- Type of dam: Earthfill
- Impounds: Chandpur river
- Height: 19 m (62 ft)
- Length: 1,051 m (3,448 ft)
- Dam volume: 80.36 km^{3} (19.28 cu mi)

Reservoir
- Total capacity: 28,879 km^{3} (6,928 cu mi)
- Surface area: 9,072 km^{2} (3,503 sq mi)

Chandpur Dam, is an earthfill dam on Chandpur river near Tumsar, Bhandara district in the state of Maharashtra in India.

== Specifications ==
The height of the dam above lowest foundation is 19 m (62 ft) while the length is 1,051 m (3,448 ft). The volume content is 80.36 km^{3} (19.28 cu mi) and gross storage capacity is 29,025.00 km^{3} (6,963.47 cu mi).

== Purpose ==
The main purpose of the dam is Irrigation.

== See also ==
- Dams in Maharashtra
- List of reservoirs and dams in India
