= Yeralwadi Dam =

- Location within Maharashtra
- Official name: Yeralwadi Dam
- Location: Khatav
- Coordinates: 17.5304835°N 74.4860065°E
- Opening date: 1973
- Owners: Government of Maharashtra, India

Dam and spillways
- Type of dam: Earthfill
- Impounds: Yerala river
- Height: 19.5 m (64 ft)
- Length: 2,115 m (6,939 ft)
- Dam volume: 663 km^{3} (159 cu mi)

Reservoir
- Total capacity: 18,060 km^{3} (4,330 cu mi)
- Surface area: 0 km^{2} (0 sq mi)

Yeralwadi Dam, is an earthfill dam on Yerala river near Khatav, Satara district in the state of Maharashtra in India.

== Specifications ==
The height of the dam above its lowest foundation is 19.5 m (64 ft) while the length is 2,115 m (6,939 ft). The volume content is 663 km^{3} (159 cu mi) and gross storage capacity is 33,020.00 km^{3} (7,921.92 cu mi).

== Purpose ==
- Irrigation
- The region of yeralwadi Dam is a birding hotspot in Satara district. Greater flamingoes, winter migratory ducks, waders have a great diversity in this region.

== See also ==
- Dams in Maharashtra
- List of reservoirs and dams in India
