= Shirsufal Dam =

Shirsufal dam
- Location within Maharashtra
- Official name: Shirsufal dam D04828
- Location: Baramati
- Coordinates: 18.34145°N 74.61489°E
- Opening date: 1879
- Owners: Government of Maharashtra, India

Dam and spillways
- Type of dam: Earthfill
- Impounds: local river
- Height: 20.11 m (66.0 ft)
- Length: 741 m (2,431 ft)

Reservoir
- Total capacity: 9,520 km^{3} (2,280 cu mi)
- Surface area: 1,601 km^{2} (618 sq mi)

Shirsufal dam, is an earthfill dam on local river near Baramati, Pune district in the state of Maharashtra in India.

== Specifications ==
The height of the dam above lowest foundation is 20.11 m (66.0 ft) while the length is 741 m (2,431 ft). The gross storage capacity is 10,100.00 km^{3} (2,423.12 cu mi).

== Purpose ==
- Irrigation

== See also ==
- Dams in Maharashtra
- List of reservoirs and dams in India
