= Wandri Dam =

- Location within Maharashtra
- Official name: Wandri Dam D02843
- Location: Palghar
- Coordinates: 19.614858°N 72.953854°E
- Opening date: 1987
- Owners: Government of Maharashtra, India

Dam and spillways
- Type of dam: Earthfill
- Impounds: Wandri river
- Height: 29.6 m (97 ft)
- Length: 1,336 m (4,383 ft)
- Dam volume: 1,206 km^{3} (289 cu mi)

Reservoir
- Total capacity: 34,710 km^{3} (8,330 cu mi)
- Surface area: 4,438 km^{2} (1,714 sq mi)

Wandri Dam, is an earthfill dam on Wandri river near Palghar, Thane district in the state of Maharashtra in India.

== Specifications ==
The height of the dam above its lowest foundation is 29.6 m (97 ft) while the length is 1,336 m (4,383 ft). The volume content is 1,206 km^{3} (289 cu mi) and gross storage capacity is 36,510.00 km^{3} (8,759.21 cu mi).

== Purpose ==
- Irrigation

== See also ==
- Dams in Maharashtra
- List of reservoirs and dams in India
