= Tultuli Dam =

- Location within Maharashtra
- Official name: Tultuli Dam
- Location: Gadchiroli
- Coordinates: 20.363296°N 80.237961°E
- Demolition date: N/A
- Owners: Government of Maharashtra, India

Dam and spillways
- Type of dam: Earthfill
- Impounds: Khobragadi river
- Height: 21.59 m (70.8 ft)
- Length: 5,280 m (17,320 ft)
- Dam volume: 2,745 km^{3} (659 cu mi)

Reservoir
- Total capacity: 216,948 km^{3} (52,049 cu mi)
- Surface area: 50,920 km^{2} (19,660 sq mi)

Tultuli Dam, is an earthfill dam on Khobragadi river near Gadchiroli in the state of Maharashtra in India.

== Specifications ==
The height of the dam above its lowest foundation is 21.59 m (70.8 ft) while the length is 5,280 m (17,320 ft). The volume content is 2,745 km^{3} (659 cu mi) and gross storage capacity is 225,051.00 km^{3} (53,992.61 cu mi).

== Purpose ==
- Irrigation

== See also ==
- Dams in Maharashtra
- List of reservoirs and dams in India
