= Kawadas Dam =

- Interactive map of Kawadas Dam
- Official name: Kawadas (Pickup) Dam
- Location: Javhar
- Opening date: 1979
- Owners: Government of Maharashtra, India

Dam and spillways
- Type of dam: Earthfill
- Impounds: local river
- Height: 28.08 m (92.1 ft)
- Length: 630 m (2,070 ft)
- Dam volume: 180 km^{3} (43 cu mi)

Reservoir
- Total capacity: 9,970 km^{3} (2,390 cu mi)
- Surface area: 5,480 km^{2} (2,120 sq mi)

Kawadas Dam, is an earthfill dam on local river near Javhar in state of Maharashtra in India.

== Specifications ==
The height of the dam above lowest foundation is 28.08 m (92.1 ft) while the length is 630 m (2,070 ft). The volume content is 180 km^{3} (43 cu mi) and gross storage capacity is 13,700.00 km^{3} (3,286.80 cu mi).

== Purpose ==
- Irrigation

== See also ==
- Dams in Maharashtra
- List of reservoirs and dams in India
