= Manikpuri Dam =

- Official name: Manikpuri Dam
- Location: Shahada
- Owners: Government of Maharashtra, India

Dam and spillways
- Type of dam: Earthfill
- Impounds: Waki river
- Height: 42.84 m (140.6 ft)
- Length: 888 m (2,913 ft)
- Dam volume: 1,453 km^{3} (349 cu mi)

Reservoir
- Total capacity: 13,450 km^{3} (3,230 cu mi)
- Surface area: 650 km^{2} (250 sq mi)

Manikpuri Dam, is an earthfill dam on Waki river near Shahada in state of Maharashtra in India.

== Specifications ==
The height of the dam above lowest foundation is 42.84 m (140.6 ft) while the length is 888 m (2,913 ft). The volume content is 1,453 km^{3} (349 cu mi) and gross storage capacity is 14,760.00 km^{3} (3,541.11 cu mi).

== Purpose ==
- Irrigation

== See also ==
- Dams in Maharashtra
- List of reservoirs and dams in India
