= Nanduri Dam =

- Location within Maharashtra
- Official name: Nanduri Dam
- Location: Ama Local Nallaher
- Coordinates: 20.4214678°N 73.8945204°E
- Demolition date: N/A
- Owners: Government of Maharashtra, India

Dam and spillways
- Type of dam: Earthfill; Gravity
- Impounds: Tapti river
- Height: 20 m (66 ft)
- Length: 2,186 m (7,172 ft)
- Dam volume: 1,381.25 km^{3} (331.38 cu mi)

Reservoir
- Total capacity: 35,780 km^{3} (8,580 cu mi)
- Surface area: 575.36 km^{2} (222.15 sq mi)

Nanduri Dam, is an earthfill and gravity dam on Tapti river near Ama Local Nallaher, Nashik district in the state of Maharashtra in India.

== Specifications ==
The height of the dam above lowest foundation is 20 m (66 ft) while the length is 2,186 m (7,172 ft). The volume content is 1,381.25 km^{3} (331.38 cu mi) and gross storage capacity is 42,056.00 km^{3} (10,089.77 cu mi).

== Purpose ==
- Irrigation
- Water supply

== See also ==
- Dams in Maharashtra
- List of reservoirs and dams in India
