= Morna Gureghar Dam =

Morna Dam
- Location within Maharashtra
- Official name: Morna (Gureghar) Dam D03137
- Location: Patan
- Coordinates: 17.2912585°N 73.8337765°E
- Opening date: 1999
- Owners: Vikramsinh Patankar, India

Dam and spillways
- Type of dam: Earthfill
- Impounds: Morna River
- Height: 28.65 m (94.0 ft)
- Length: 600 m (2,000 ft)
- Dam volume: 1,109 km^{3} (266 cu mi)

Reservoir
- Total capacity: 41,460 km^{3} (9,950 cu mi)
- Surface area: 4,930 km^{2} (1,900 sq mi)

Morna Dam, also called as Gureghar dam, is an earthfill dam on local river near Patur, Satara district in the state of Maharashtra in India.

== Specifications ==
The height of the dam above lowest foundation is 28.65 m (94.0 ft) while the length is 600 m (2,000 ft). The volume content is 1,109 km^{3} (266 cu mi) and gross storage capacity is 44,740.00 km^{3} (10,733.70 cu mi).

== Purpose ==
- Irrigation

== See also ==
- Dams in Maharashtra
- List of reservoirs and dams in India
