= Tembhapuri Dam =

- Location within Maharashtra
- Official name: Tembhapuri Dam D02917
- Location: Aurangabad
- Coordinates: 19.742409°N 75.191267°E
- Opening date: 1994
- Owners: Government of Maharashtra, India

Dam and spillways
- Type of dam: Earthfill
- Impounds: Nagzari river
- Height: 16.42 m (53.9 ft)
- Length: 5,300 m (17,400 ft)
- Dam volume: 809 km^{3} (194 cu mi)

Reservoir
- Total capacity: 19,000 km^{3} (4,600 cu mi)
- Surface area: 8,495 km^{2} (3,280 sq mi)

Tembhapuri Dam, is an earthfill dam on Nagzari river near Aurangabad in the state of Maharashtra in India. It is a tourist attraction in the monsoon season as it is really near to the Aurangabad city.

== Specifications ==
The height of the dam above its lowest foundation is 16.42 m (53.9 ft) while the length is 5,300 m (17,400 ft). The volume content is 809 km^{3} (194 cu mi) and gross storage capacity is 21,260.00 km^{3} (5,100.55 cu mi).

== Purpose ==
- Irrigation

== See also ==
- Dams in Maharashtra
- List of reservoirs and dams in India
