= Ekburji Dam =

- Location within Maharashtra
- Official name: Ekburji Dam D01207
- Location: Washim
- Coordinates: 20.0447743°N 77.1011067°E
- Opening date: 1964
- Owners: Government of Maharashtra, India

Dam and spillways
- Type of dam: Earthfill
- Impounds: Chandrabhaga river
- Height: 23.7 m (78 ft)
- Length: 830 m (2,720 ft)
- Dam volume: 566 km^{3} (136 cu mi)

Reservoir
- Total capacity: 11,960 km^{3} (2,870 cu mi)
- Surface area: 218 km^{2} (84 sq mi)

Ekburji Dam, is an earthfill dam on Chandrabhaga river near Washim in the state of Maharashtra in India.

== Specifications ==
The height of the dam above lowest foundation is 23.7 m (78 ft) while the length is 830 m (2,720 ft). The volume content is 566 km^{3} (136 cu mi) and gross storage capacity is 14,100.00 km^{3} (3,382.77 cu mi).

== Purpose ==
- Irrigation
- Water Supply for Washim town

== See also ==
- Dams in Maharashtra
- List of reservoirs and dams in India
