= Anjneri Dam =

- Location within Maharashtra
- Official name: Anjneri Dam
- Location: Sakri
- Coordinates: 19.9349813°N 73.591066°E
- Demolition date: N/A
- Owners: Government of Maharashtra, India

Dam and spillways
- Type of dam: Earthfill
- Impounds: Panzara river
- Height: 32.3 m (106 ft)
- Length: 3,137 m (10,292 ft)
- Dam volume: 4,326 km^{3} (1,038 cu mi)

Reservoir
- Total capacity: 87,870 km^{3} (21,080 cu mi)
- Surface area: 14,815 km^{2} (5,720 sq mi)

Anjneri Dam, is an earthfill dam on Panzara River near Sakri in Nashik district of state of Maharashtra in India.

== Specifications ==
The height of the dam above lowest foundation is 32.3 m (106 ft) while the length is 3,137 m (10,292 ft). The volume content is 4,326 km^{3} (1,038 cu mi) and gross storage capacity is 107,790.00 km^{3} (25,860.20 cu mi).

== Purpose ==
- Irrigation

== See also ==
- Dams in Maharashtra
- List of reservoirs and dams in India
