= Jamkhed Dam =

- Location within Maharashtra
- Official name: Jamkhed Dam D03999
- Location: Mukhed
- Coordinates: 18.6293894°N 77.4695349°E
- Demolition date: N/A
- Owners: Government of Maharashtra, India

Dam and spillways
- Type of dam: Earthfill
- Impounds: local river
- Height: 16.9 m (55 ft)
- Length: 1,605 m (5,266 ft)
- Dam volume: 44 km^{3} (11 cu mi)

Reservoir
- Total capacity: 8,150 km^{3} (1,960 cu mi)
- Surface area: 0 km^{2} (0 sq mi)

Jamkhed Dam is an earthfill dam on local river near Mukhed, Nanded district in state of Maharashtra in India.

== Specifications ==
The height of the dam above lowest foundation is 16.9 m (55 ft) while the length is 1,605 m (5,266 ft). The volume content is 44 m^{3} (1,600 cu ft) and gross storage capacity is 10,230.00 m^{3} (361,269 cu ft).

== Purpose ==
- Irrigation

== See also ==
- Dams in Maharashtra
- List of reservoirs and dams in India
