= Raigavan Dam =

- Location within Maharashtra
- Official name: Raigavan Dam D02845
- Location: Kalam
- Coordinates: 18.4867677°N 76.2570047°E
- Opening date: 1987
- Owners: Government of Maharashtra, India

Dam and spillways
- Type of dam: Earthfill
- Impounds: local river
- Height: 19.74 m (64.8 ft)
- Length: 2,090 m (6,860 ft)
- Dam volume: 0 km^{3} (0 cu mi)

Reservoir
- Total capacity: 11,259 km^{3} (2,701 cu mi)
- Surface area: 4,920 km^{2} (1,900 sq mi)

Raigavan Dam, is an earthfill dam on local river near Kalam, Osmanabad district in the state of Maharashtra in India.

== Specifications ==
The height of the dam above lowest foundation is 19.74 m (64.8 ft) while the length is 2,090 m (6,860 ft). The volume content is 0 km^{3} (0 cu mi) and gross storage capacity is 12,703.00 km^{3} (3,047.61 cu mi).

== Purpose ==
- Irrigation

== See also ==
- Dams in Maharashtra
- List of reservoirs and dams in India
