= Berdewadi Dam =

Berdewadi dam
- Location within Maharashtra
- Official name: Berdewadi dam
- Location: Lanja
- Coordinates: 16.8668045°N 73.6151522°E
- Opening date: 2001
- Owners: Government of Maharashtra, India

Dam and spillways
- Type of dam: Earthfill
- Impounds: local river
- Height: 61.19 m (200.8 ft)
- Length: 656 m (2,152 ft)
- Dam volume: 1,796.2 km^{3} (430.9 cu mi)

Reservoir
- Total capacity: 15,356 km^{3} (3,684 cu mi)
- Surface area: 871 km^{2} (336 sq mi)

Berdewadi dam, is an earthfill dam on local river near Lanja, Ratnagiri district in the state of Maharashtra in India.

== Specifications ==
The height of the dam above lowest foundation is 61.19 m (200.8 ft) while the length is 656 m (2,152 ft). The volume content is 1,796.2 km^{3} (430.9 cu mi) and gross storage capacity is 15,841.00 km^{3} (3,800.46 cu mi).

== Purpose ==
- Irrigation

== See also ==
- Dams in Maharashtra
- List of reservoirs and dams in India
