= Waldevi Dam =

- Location within Maharashtra
- Official name: Waldevi Dam D03212
- Location: Nasik
- Coordinates: 19.8989148°N 73.6733296°E
- Opening date: 1995
- Owners: Government of Maharashtra, India

Dam and spillways
- Type of dam: Earthfill
- Impounds: Waldevi river
- Height: 36.4 m (119 ft)
- Length: 1,890 m (6,200 ft)
- Dam volume: 1,304 km^{3} (313 cu mi)

Reservoir
- Total capacity: 32,050 km^{3} (7,690 cu mi)
- Surface area: 3,437 km^{2} (1,327 sq mi)

Waldevi Dam, is an earthfill dam on the Waldevi River near Nashik in the state of Maharashtra in India.

== Specifications ==
The height of the dam above its lowest foundation is 36.4 m (119 ft) while the length is 1,890 m (6,200 ft). The volume content is 1,304 km^{3} (313 cu mi) and the gross storage capacity is 33,720.00 km^{3} (8,089.86 cu mi).

== Purpose ==
- Irrigation

== See also ==
- Dams in Maharashtra
- List of reservoirs and dams in India
