= Uttarmand Dam =

- Location within Maharashtra
- Official name: Uttarmand Dam D03142
- Location: Patan
- Coordinates: 17.404455°N 74.019270°E
- Opening date: 2001
- Owners: Government of Maharashtra, India

Dam and spillways
- Type of dam: Earthfill
- Impounds: Uttarmand river
- Height: 46.45 m (152.4 ft)
- Length: 1,389 m (4,557 ft)
- Dam volume: 0 km^{3} (0 cu mi)

Reservoir
- Total capacity: 0 km^{3} (0 cu mi)
- Surface area: 2,393 km^{2} (924 sq mi)

Uttarmand Dam, is an earthfill dam on Uttarmand river near Patan, Satara district in the state of Maharashtra in India.

== Specifications ==
The height of the dam above its lowest foundation is 46.45 m (152.4 ft) while the length is 1,389 m (4,557 ft). The volume content is 0 km^{3} (0 cu mi) and gross storage capacity is 24,925.00 km^{3} (5,979.83 cu mi).

== Purpose ==
- Irrigation

== See also ==
- Dams in Maharashtra
- List of reservoirs and dams in India
