= Kanholibara Dam =

- Location within Maharashtra
- Official name: Kanholibara Dam D01348
- Location: Hingana
- Coordinates: 20.9393663°N 78.8381374°E
- Opening date: 1976
- Owners: Government of Maharashtra, India

Dam and spillways
- Type of dam: Earthfill
- Impounds: Krishna river
- Height: 21.05 m (69.1 ft)
- Length: 1,365 m (4,478 ft)
- Dam volume: 115.3 km^{3} (27.7 cu mi)

Reservoir
- Total capacity: 19,820 km^{3} (4,760 cu mi)
- Surface area: 333 km^{2} (129 sq mi)

Kanholibara Dam is an earthfill dam on a local river Krishna near Hingana, Nagpur district in state of Maharashtra in India.

== Specifications ==
The height of the dam above lowest foundation is 21.05 m (69.1 ft) while the length is 1,365 m (4,478 ft). The volume content is 115.3 km^{3} (27.7 cu mi) and gross storage capacity is 22,213.00 km^{3} (5,329.18 cu mi).

== Purpose ==
- Irrigation

== See also ==
- Dams in Maharashtra
- List of reservoirs and dams in India
