= Burai Dam =

- Location within Maharashtra
- Official name: Burai Dam D01422
- Location: Sakri
- Coordinates: 21.1533767°N 74.5728349°E
- Opening date: 1983
- Owners: Government of Maharashtra, India

Dam and spillways
- Type of dam: Earthfill
- Impounds: Burai river
- Height: 30.6 m (100 ft)
- Length: 1,013 m (3,323 ft)
- Dam volume: 0.0168 km^{3} (0.0040 cu mi)

Reservoir
- Total capacity: 0.014210 km^{3} (0.003409 cu mi)
- Surface area: 3.1440 km^{2} (1.2139 sq mi)

Burai Dam is an earthfill dam on Burai River near Sakri, Dhule district in state of Maharashtra in India.

== Specifications ==
The height of the dam above its lowest foundation is 30.6 m (100 ft) while the length is 1,013 m (3,323 ft). The volume content is 168 km^{3} (40 cu mi) and gross storage capacity is 0.021330 km^{3} (0.005117 cu mi).

== Purpose ==
- Irrigation

== See also ==
- Dams in Maharashtra
- List of reservoirs and dams in India
