= Jakapur Dam =

- Location within Maharashtra
- Official name: Jakapur Dam D01319
- Location: Umarga
- Coordinates: 17.8382056°N 76.5671003°E
- Opening date: 1977
- Owners: Government of Maharashtra, India

Dam and spillways
- Type of dam: Earthfill
- Impounds: local river
- Height: 14.8 m (49 ft)
- Length: 2,257 m (7,405 ft)
- Dam volume: 322 km^{3} (77 cu mi)

Reservoir
- Total capacity: 0 km^{3} (0 cu mi)
- Surface area: 0 km^{2} (0 sq mi)

Jakapur Dam, is an earthfill dam on local river near Umarga, Osmanabad district in state of Maharashtra in India.

== Specifications ==
The height of the dam above lowest foundation is 14.8 m (49 ft) while the length is 2,257 m (7,405 ft). The volume content is 322 km^{3} (77 cu mi) and gross storage capacity is 10,176.00 km^{3} (2,441.35 cu mi).

== Purpose ==
- Irrigation

== See also ==
- Dams in Maharashtra
- List of reservoirs and dams in India
