= Dhaner Dam =

- Location within Maharashtra
- Official name: Dhaner Dam D03655
- Location: Burhanpur
- Coordinates: 20.3293164°N 74.5255026°E
- Opening date: 1979
- Demolition date: N/A
- Owners: Government of Maharashtra, India

Dam and spillways
- Type of dam: Gravity
- Height: 27.7 m (91 ft)
- Length: 425 m (1,394 ft)

Reservoir
- Total capacity: 141,000 km^{3} (34,000 cu mi)
- Surface area: 170 km^{2} (66 sq mi)

Dhaner Dam, is a gravity dam near Nandgaon, Nashik district in state of Maharashtra in India.

== Specifications ==
The height of the dam above lowest foundation is 27.7 m (91 ft) while the length is 425 m (1,394 ft). The gross storage capacity is 141,000.00 km^{3} (33,827.70 cu mi).

== Purpose ==
- Irrigation

== See also ==
- Dams in Maharashtra
- List of reservoirs and dams in India
