= Bhudihal Dam =

- Interactive map of Bhudihal Dam
- Official name: Bhudihal Dam D03459
- Location: Sangola
- Opening date: 1966
- Owners: Government of Maharashtra, India

Dam and spillways
- Type of dam: Earthfill
- Impounds: Belwan river
- Height: 18.5 m (61 ft)
- Length: 2,975 m (9,760 ft)

Reservoir
- Total capacity: 0.027950 km^{3} (0.006706 cu mi)

Bhudihal Dam, is an earthfill dam on Belwan river near Sangola, Solapur district in the state of Maharashtra in India.

== Specifications ==
The height of the dam above lowest foundation is 18.5 m (61 ft) while the length is 2,975 m (9,760 ft). The gross storage capacity is 0.032050 km^{3} (0.007689 cu mi).

== Purpose ==
- Irrigation

== See also ==
- Dams in Maharashtra
- List of reservoirs and dams in India
