= Kalisarar Dam =

- Location within Maharashtra
- Official name: Kalisarar Dam D01115
- Location: Salekasa
- Coordinates: 21.1766288°N 80.4530242°E
- Opening date: 1988
- Owners: Government of Maharashtra, India

Dam and spillways
- Type of dam: Earthfill; Gravity
- Impounds: Kalisarar river
- Height: 25.52 m (83.7 ft)
- Length: 830 m (2,720 ft)
- Dam volume: 697 km^{3} (167 cu mi)

Reservoir
- Total capacity: 27,750 km^{3} (6,660 cu mi)
- Surface area: 6,500 km^{2} (2,500 sq mi)

Kalisarar Dam, is an earthfill and gravity dam on Kalisarar river near Salekasa, Gondia district in the state of Maharashtra in India.

== Specifications ==
The height of the dam above lowest foundation is 25.52 m (83.7 ft) while the length is 830 m (2,720 ft). The volume content is 697 km^{3} (167 cu mi) and gross storage capacity is 30,460.00 km^{3} (7,307.74 cu mi).

== Purpose ==
- Irrigation

== See also ==
- Dams in Maharashtra
- List of reservoirs and dams in India
