= Savatri Dam =

Savitri Dam
- Location within Maharashtra
- Official name: Savitri Dam D04776
- Location: Poladpur
- Coordinates: 17.9791633°N 73.4809827°E
- Opening date: 1999
- Owners: Government of Maharashtra, India

Dam and spillways
- Type of dam: Gravity
- Impounds: Savitri river
- Height: 33.62 m (110.3 ft)
- Length: 320 m (1,050 ft)
- Dam volume: 196 km^{3} (47 cu mi)

Reservoir
- Total capacity: 26,360 km^{3} (6,320 cu mi)
- Surface area: 2,700 km^{2} (1,000 sq mi)

Savitri Dam, is a gravity dam on Savitri River near Poladpur, Raigad district in state of Maharashtra in India.

== Specifications ==
The height of the dam above lowest foundation is 33.62 m (110.3 ft) while the length is 320 m (1,050 ft). The volume content is 196 km^{3} (47 cu mi) and gross storage capacity is 29,450.00 km^{3} (7,065.43 cu mi).

== Purpose ==
- Water supply

== See also ==
- Dams in Maharashtra
- List of reservoirs and dams in India
