= Ekrukh Dam =

Ekrukh dam
- Location within Maharashtra
- Official name: Ekrukh dam D00981
- Location: Solapur
- Coordinates: 17.7402569°N 75.9149802°E
- Opening date: 1871
- Owners: Government of Maharashtra, India

Dam and spillways
- Type of dam: Earthfill
- Impounds: Adela river
- Height: 21.45 m (70.4 ft)
- Length: 2,360 m (7,740 ft)
- Dam volume: 130 km^{3} (31 cu mi)

Reservoir
- Total capacity: 61,170 km^{3} (14,680 cu mi)
- Surface area: 0 km^{2} (0 sq mi)

Ekrukh dam, is an earthfill dam on Adela river near north Solapur in the state of Maharashtra in India.

== Specifications ==
The height of the dam above lowest foundation is 21.45 m (70.4 ft) while the length is 2,360 m (7,740 ft). The volume content is 130 km^{3} (31 cu mi) and gross storage capacity is 61,170.00 km^{3} (14,675.46 cu mi).

== Purpose ==
- Irrigation
- Water Supply

== See also ==
- Dams in Maharashtra
- List of reservoirs and dams in India
