= Khelocala Dam =

- Official name: Khelocala Dam
- Location: Sillod
- Opening date: 1964
- Owners: Government of Maharashtra, India

Dam and spillways
- Type of dam: Earthfill
- Impounds: Khelocala river
- Height: 21 m (69 ft)
- Length: 759 m (2,490 ft)
- Dam volume: 588 km^{3} (141 cu mi)

Reservoir
- Total capacity: 11,070 km^{3} (2,660 cu mi)
- Surface area: 3,678 km^{2} (1,420 sq mi)

Khelocala Dam is an earthfill dam on Khelocala river near Sillod in State of Maharashtra in India.

== Specifications ==
The height of the dam above lowest foundation is 21 m (69 ft) while the length is 759 m (2,490 ft). The volume content is 588 km^{3} (141 cu mi) and gross storage capacity is 13,000.00 km^{3} (3,118.87 cu mi).

== Purpose ==
- Irrigation

== See also ==
- Dams in Maharashtra
- List of reservoirs and dams in India
