= Lalocalalla Dam =

- Official name: Lalocalalla Dam
- Location: Samudrapur
- Opening date: 2006
- Owners: Government of Maharashtra, India

Dam and spillways
- Type of dam: Earthfill
- Impounds: local river
- Height: 13.9 m (46 ft)
- Length: 3,385 m (11,106 ft)
- Dam volume: 407.67 km^{3} (97.81 cu mi)

Reservoir
- Total capacity: 27,613 km^{3} (6,625 cu mi)
- Surface area: 9,039 km^{2} (3,490 sq mi)

Lalocalalla Dam, is an earthfill dam on a local river near Samudrapur in the state of Maharashtra in India.

== Specifications ==
The height of the dam above lowest foundation is 13.9 m (46 ft) while the length is 3,385 m (11,106 ft). The volume content is 407.67 km^{3} (97.81 cu mi) and gross storage capacity is 29,515.00 km^{3} (7,081.03 cu mi).

== Purpose ==
- Irrigation

== See also ==
- Dams in Maharashtra
- List of reservoirs and dams in India
