= Natuwadi Dam =

- Location within Maharashtra
- Official name: Natuwadi Dam D02895
- Location: Khed
- Coordinates: 17.8322977°N 73.3994113°E
- Opening date: 1984
- Owners: Government of Maharashtra, India

Dam and spillways
- Type of dam: Earthfill
- Impounds: Tr.of Chorti river
- Height: 45.25 m (148.5 ft)
- Length: 900 m (3,000 ft)
- Dam volume: 22.3 km^{3} (5.4 cu mi)

Reservoir
- Total capacity: 27,230 km^{3} (6,530 cu mi)
- Surface area: 2,000 km^{2} (770 sq mi)

Natuwadi Dam, is an earthfill dam on Tr.of Charti river near Khed, Ratnagiri district in the state of Maharashtra in India.

== Specifications ==
The height of the dam above lowest foundation is 45.25 m (148.5 ft) while the length is 900 m (3,000 ft). The volume content is 22.3 km^{3} (5.4 cu mi) and gross storage capacity is 28,080.00 km^{3} (6,736.75 cu mi).

== Purpose ==
- Irrigation

== See also ==
- Dams in Maharashtra
- List of reservoirs and dams in India
