= Chorkhamara Dam =

- Location within Maharashtra
- Official name: Chorkhamara Dam D01008
- Location: Tiroda
- Coordinates: 21.2909163°N 79.9474803°E
- Opening date: 1923
- Owners: Government of Maharashtra, India

Dam and spillways
- Type of dam: Earthfill
- Impounds: Sasanda river
- Height: 21.05 m (69.1 ft)
- Length: 1,178 m (3,865 ft)
- Dam volume: 300 km^{3} (72 cu mi)

Reservoir
- Total capacity: 20,800 km^{3} (5,000 cu mi)
- Surface area: 5,235 km^{2} (2,021 sq mi)

Chorkhamara Dam, is an earthfill dam on Sasanda river near Tiroda, Gondia district in the state of Maharashtra in India.

== Specifications ==
The height of the dam above lowest foundation is 21.05 m (69.1 ft) while the length is 1,178 m (3,865 ft). The volume content is 300 km^{3} (72 cu mi) and gross storage capacity is 21,051.00 km^{3} (5,050.40 cu mi).

== Purpose ==
- Irrigation

== See also ==
- Dams in Maharashtra
- List of reservoirs and dams in India
