= Tarandale Dam =

- Interactive map of Tarandale Dam
- Official name: Tarandale Dam
- Location: Kankawali
- Coordinates: 16.3012°N 73.6728°E
- Opening date: 2007
- Owners: Government of Maharashtra, India

Dam and spillways
- Type of dam: Earthfill
- Impounds: local river
- Height: 48 m (157 ft)
- Length: 400 m (1,300 ft)

Reservoir
- Total capacity: 9,810 km^{3} (2,350 cu mi)
- Website https://tarandale.kankavligov.com

Tarandale Dam is an earthfill dam on local river near Kankawali in the state of Maharashtra in India.

== Specifications ==
The height of the dam above its lowest foundation is 48 m (157 ft) while the length is 400 m (1,300 ft). The gross storage capacity is 10,800.00 km^{3} (2,591.06 cu mi).

== See also ==
- Dams in Maharashtra
- List of reservoirs and dams in India
