= Pargaon Ghatshil Dam =

- Location within Maharashtra
- Official name: Pargaon Ghatshil Dam D01358
- Location: Pargaon Ghatshil
- Coordinates: 19.1182059°N 75.3577993°E
- Opening date: 1977
- Owners: Government of Maharashtra, India

Dam and spillways
- Type of dam: Earthfill
- Impounds: Kinha river
- Height: 22.46 m (73.7 ft)
- Length: 911.65 m (2,991.0 ft)
- Dam volume: 297 km^{3} (71 cu mi)

Reservoir
- Total capacity: 0 km^{3} (0 cu mi)
- Surface area: 3,740 km^{2} (1,440 sq mi)

Pargaon Ghatshil Dam, also called Ghatshil Pargaon dam, is an earthfill dam on Kinha river near Pargaon Ghatshil, Beed district in the state of Maharashtra in India.

== Specifications ==
The height of the dam above lowest foundation is 22.46 m (73.7 ft) while the length is 911.65 m (2,991.0 ft). The volume content is 297 km^{3} (71 cu mi) and gross storage capacity is 12,450.00 km^{3} (2,986.91 cu mi).

== Purpose ==
- Irrigation

== See also ==
- Dams in Maharashtra
- List of reservoirs and dams in India
