= Shetfal Dam =

- Location within Maharashtra
- Official name: Shetfal Dam D04809
- Location: Indapur
- Coordinates: 18.0223641°N 74.9625063°E
- Opening date: 1901
- Owners: Government of Maharashtra, India

Dam and spillways
- Type of dam: Earthfill
- Impounds: Shetfal river
- Height: 20.11 m (66.0 ft)
- Length: 3,211 m (10,535 ft)
- Dam volume: 173 km^{3} (42 cu mi)

Reservoir
- Total capacity: 1,693 km^{3} (406 cu mi)
- Surface area: 3,498 km^{2} (1,351 sq mi)

Shetfal Dam, is an earthfill dam on Shetfal river near Indapur, Pune district in the state of Maharashtra in India.

== Specifications ==
The height of the dam above lowest foundation is 20.11 m (66.0 ft) while the length is 3,211 m (10,535 ft). The volume content is 173 km^{3} (42 cu mi) and gross storage capacity is 17,360.00 km^{3} (4,164.89 cu mi).

== Purpose ==
- Irrigation

== See also ==
- Dams in Maharashtra
- List of reservoirs and dams in India
