= Sukhana Dam =

Sukhana Dam garkheda a'bad
- Location within Maharashtra
- Official name: Sukhana Dam D01218
- Location: Aurangabad
- Coordinates: 19.8055078°N 75.5157897°E
- Opening date: 1968
- Owners: Government of Maharashtra, India

Dam and spillways
- Type of dam: Earthfill
- Impounds: Sukhana river
- Height: 16.92 m (55.5 ft)
- Length: 446 m (1,463 ft)
- Dam volume: 68,000 m^{3} (2,400,000 cu ft)

Reservoir
- Total capacity: 18,480,000 m^{3} (653,000,000 cu ft)
- Surface area: 6.782 km^{2} (2.619 sq mi)

Sukhana Dam, is an earthfill dam on Sukhana river near Aurangabad, in the state of Maharashtra, in India.

== Specifications ==
The height of the dam above lowest foundation is 16.92 m (55.5 ft) while the length is 446 m (1,463 ft). The volume content is 68,000 m^{3} (2,400,000 cu ft) and gross storage capacity is 21,340,000 m^{3} (754,000,000 cu ft).

== See also ==
- Dams in Maharashtra
- List of reservoirs and dams in India
