= Dehali Dam =

- Location within Maharashtra Location within India
- Interactive map of Dehali Dam
- Official name: Dehali Dam
- Location: Sind Kheda
- Coordinates: 21°35′44″N 75°37′24″E
- Owners: Government of Maharashtra, India

Dam and spillways
- Type of dam: Earthfill
- Impounds: Tapi river
- Height: 28.26 m (92.7 ft)
- Length: 5,349 m (17,549 ft)
- Dam volume: 1,762 km^{3} (423 cu mi)

Reservoir
- Total capacity: 65,060 km^{3} (15,610 cu mi)
- Surface area: 1,229 km^{2} (475 sq mi)

Dehali Dam is an earthfill dam on Tapi river near Sind Kheda in state of Maharashtra in India.

== Specifications ==
The height of the dam above lowest foundation is 28.26 m (92.7 ft) while the length is 5,349 m (17,549 ft). The volume content is 1,762 km^{3} (423 cu mi) and gross storage capacity is 65,060.00 km^{3} (15,608.72 cu mi).

== Purpose ==
- Irrigation
- Water Supply

== See also ==
- Dams in Maharashtra
- List of reservoirs and dams in India
