= Hetwane Dam =

- Interactive map of Hetwane Dam
- Official name: Hetwane Dam D03050
- Location: Pen
- Coordinates: 18.722190°N 73.181093°E
- Opening date: 2000
- Owners: Government of Maharashtra, India

Dam and spillways
- Type of dam: Earthfill
- Impounds: Near Wakrul village Bhogeshwari river
- Height: 48.2 m (158 ft)
- Length: 675 m (2,215 ft)
- Dam volume: 0.144980 km^{3} (0.034783 cu mi)

Reservoir
- Total capacity: 0.137625 km^{3} (0.033018 cu mi)
- Surface area: 6.740 km^{2} (2.602 sq mi)

Hetwane Dam, is an earthfill dam on Bhogeshwari river near Pen, Raigad district in the state of Maharashtra in India.

== Specifications ==
The height of the dam above lowest foundation is 48.2 m (158 ft) while the length is 675 m (2,215 ft). The volume content is 0.144980 km^{3} (0.034783 cu mi) and gross storage capacity is 0.147490 km^{3} (0.035385 cu mi).

Hetwane dam was constructed by Maharashtra Master Construction.

== Purpose ==
- Irrigation
- Water Supply to Navi Mumbai

== See also ==
- Dams in Maharashtra
- List of reservoirs and dams in India
