= Jamkhedi Dam =

- Location within Maharashtra
- Official name: Jamkhedi Dam D03115
- Location: Sakri
- Coordinates: 21.0028813°N 74.1029441°E
- Opening date: 2001
- Owners: Government of Maharashtra, India

Dam and spillways
- Type of dam: Earthfill
- Impounds: Jamkhedi river
- Height: 29.62 m (97.2 ft)
- Length: 1,750 m (5,740 ft)
- Dam volume: 710 km^{3} (170 cu mi)

Reservoir
- Total capacity: 12,290 km^{3} (2,950 cu mi)
- Surface area: 2,081 km^{2} (803 sq mi)

Jamkhedi Dam, is an earthfill dam on Jamkhedi river near Sakri, Dhule district in state of Maharashtra in India.

== Specifications ==
The height of the dam above lowest foundation is 29.62 m (97.2 ft) while the length is 1,750 m (5,740 ft). The volume content is 710 km^{3} (170 cu mi) and gross storage capacity is 14,450.00 km^{3} (3,466.74 cu mi).

== Purpose ==
- Irrigation

== See also ==
- Dams in Maharashtra
- List of reservoirs and dams in India
