= Galhati Dam =

- Location within Maharashtra
- Official name: Galhati Dam D01209
- Location: Baraswada
- Coordinates: 19.5139356°N 75.7385444°E
- Opening date: 1966
- Owners: Government of Maharashtra, India

Dam and spillways
- Type of dam: Earthfill
- Impounds: Galhati river
- Height: 13.1 m (43 ft)
- Length: 2,987 m (9,800 ft)

Galhati Dam, is an earthfill dam on Galhati river at Baraswada, Ambad, Jalna district in State of Maharashtra in India.

== Specifications ==
The height of the dam above lowest foundation is 13.1 m (43 ft) while the length is 2,987 m (9,800 ft). The live storage capacity is 13.88 million cubic metres (490×10^{6} cu ft).

== Purpose ==
- Irrigation

== See also ==
- Dams in Maharashtra
- List of reservoirs and dams in India
