= Tisgaon Dam =

- Location within Maharashtra
- Official name: Tisgaon Dam D02974
- Location: Dindori
- Coordinates: 20.2581307°N 73.9527943°E
- Opening date: 1995
- Owners: Government of Maharashtra, India

Dam and spillways
- Type of dam: Earthfill
- Impounds: Parashri river
- Height: 24.9 m (82 ft)
- Length: 1,674 m (5,492 ft)
- Dam volume: 1,080 km^{3} (260 cu mi)

Reservoir
- Total capacity: 12,440 km^{3} (2,980 cu mi)
- Surface area: 292 km^{2} (113 sq mi)

Tisgaon Dam, is an earthfill dam on Parashri river near Dindori, Nashik district in the state of Maharashtra in India.

== Specifications ==
The height of the dam above its lowest foundation is 24.9 m (82 ft) while the length is 1,674 m (5,492 ft). The volume content is 1,080 km^{3} (260 cu mi) and gross storage capacity is 15,140.00 km^{3} (3,632.28 cu mi).

== Purpose ==
- Irrigation

== See also ==
- Dams in Maharashtra
- List of reservoirs and dams in India
- Bhalerao 701
