= List of dams and reservoirs in Maharashtra =

There are around 1821 notable large dams in state of Maharashtra in India.

== Dams in Maharashtra by specification ==
The table below list dams of state of Maharashtra by their specifications which has gross storage capacity more than 10,000 10^{3}m^{3}.

Name of dam	Year completed	River	District	Type	Height (m)	Length (m)	Volume content (10^{3}m^{3})	Gross storage capacity (10^{3}m^{3})	Reservoir area (10^{3}m^{2})	Effective storage capacity (10^{3}m^{3})	Purpose	Designed spillway capacity (m^{3}/s)
Dhamapur	1600	Malvan	Sindhudurg	Earthfill	11	217	2687				Irrigation	9.85
Vihar	1860	Vihar	Mumbai Suburban	Earthfill	25.6	817	353	41459.00	7270	41410.00	Water Supply	
Ekrukh	1871	Adela	Solapur	Earthfill	21.45	2360	130	61170.00		61170.00	Irrigation; Water Supply	1239
Shirsufal	1879	local	Pune	Earthfill	20.11	741		10100.00	1601	9520.00	Irrigation	112
Tulshi	1879	Tulshi	Mumbai Suburban	Earthfill; Gravity	26	186		10429.00	1350	10273.00	Water supply	640
Khadakwasla	1880	Mutha	Pune	Earthfill; Gravity	32.9	1539	1170	86000.00	14800	560000.00	Irrigation; Water supply	2755
Ashti	1883	Ashti	Solapur	Earthfill	17.6	3871		40000.00		23000.00	Irrigation	1359
Mhaswad	1887	Man		Earthfill	24	2473		47880.00	16251	46210.00	Irrigation	4321.41
Tansa	1892	Tansa		Earthfill; Gravity	41	2804	2670	208700.00	19.1	184600.00	Water supply	1188.6
Shetfal	1901	Shetfal Nalla		Earthfill	20.11	3211	173	17360.00	3498	1693.00	Irrigation	
Khairbandha	1903	Fattepur		Earthfill	18.16	2205	243.52	16798.00	4147	15953.00	Irrigation	363.3
Pathari	1905	local		Earthfill	18.43	2070		11880.00		11620.00	Irrigation	512
Chankapur	1911	Girna		Earthfill	41	3705	2123	79690.00	10320	76850.00	Irrigation	2237
Ramtek	1913	Sur		Earthfill	22.2	229	1300	105130.00	21270	103000.00	Irrigation	515
Chandpur	1915	Chandpur		Earthfill	19	1051	80.36	29025.00	9072	28879.00	Irrigation	339.25
Walwan	1916	Indrayani		Gravity	26.36	1356	182	72500.00	14250	72122.00	Hydroelectricity	171
Darna	1916	Darna		Gravity	28	1634	1886.1	226870.00	34750	209820.00	Irrigation	3336
Bodalkasa	1917	Bhagdeogoti		Earthfill	19.2	510	107.62	17392.00	6450	16454.00	Irrigation	206.63
Asolamendha	1918	local	Chandrapur	Earthfill	18.08	1376.52	350	67015.00	1880	56375.00	Irrigation	758
Shirvata	1920	Indrayani	Pune	Gravity	38.71	2212	460	185980.00	13.08	185110.00	Hydroelectricity	593
Thokarwadi	1922	Indrayani	Pune	Gravity	59.44	741	212	363700.00	24.3	321200.00	Hydroelectricity	546
Chorkhamara	1923	Sasanda	Gadchiroli	Earthfill	21.05	1178	300	21051.00	5235	20800.00	Irrigation	264.94
Ghorazari	1923	Gorazari	Chandrapur	Earthfill	23.55	731.7	90	45080.00	976	38000.00	Irrigation	320
Bhandardara	1926	Paravara	Ahmednagar	Gravity	82.35	2717	335	312400.00	743.18	307310.00	Irrigation	1503
Bhatghar	1927	Velvandi	Pune	Gravity	57.92	1625	650	670650.00	31900	666000.00	Irrigation; Hydroelectricity	1599
Mulshi	1927	Mula	Pune	Gravity	48.8	1533.38		52230.00	3802		Hydroelectricity	1892
Mas	1932	Mas	Buldhana	Earthfill	17.71	663	399	17500.00	4810	15040.00	Irrigation	1753
Ghanewadi	1935	Kundlika	Jalna	Earthfill	15	836		14440.00			Water Supply	
Visapur	1936	Hanga	Ahmednagar	Earthfill	26	2692	130	33320.00		33320.00	Irrigation	2627
Radhanagari	1954	Bhogawati	Kolhapur	Gravity	42.68	1143		236810.00	18218	220000.00	Irrigation; Hydroelectricity	1133
Vaitarna (Modaksagar)	1954	Vaitarna	Mumbai	Gravity	82	567.07	0.06	204980.00	8.39	174790.00	Water supply	5660
Purmepeda	1955	Bori	Dhule	Earthfill	24.7	1500	525	13550.00	303	12960.00	Irrigation	2141
Khasapur	1956	local	Osmanabad	Earthfill	23.78	1882		19830.00	430	15830.00	Irrigation	2863
Dheku	1960	Dheku	Aurangabad	Earthfill	20	2421	137	14000.00	447	12160.00	Irrigation	1945
Sindphana	1963	Sindphana		Earthfill	19.05	1937	12593	12600.00	5068	10810.00	Irrigation	1857
Ekburji	1964	Chandrabhaga	Washim	Earthfill	23.7	830	566	14100.00	218	11960.00	Irrigation	1001
Khelocala	1964	Khelocala	Aurangabad	Earthfill	21	759	588	13000.00	3678	11070.00	Irrigation	1518
Upper Dudhana	1964	Dudhana	Jalna	Earthfill	18	2750	965	15000.00	445	13010.00	Irrigation	1912
Koyna	1964	Koyna	Satara	Gravity	103	805	1555	2797400.00	11535	2640000.00	Hydroelectricity	3883
Gangapur	1965	Godavari	Nashik	Earthfill	36.59	3902	4612	215880.00	22860	203880.00	Irrigation	2293
Chandani	1965	Chandani	Dharashiv	Earthfill	17.18	1920	289	20700.00	813	15220.00	Irrigation	3030
Bor	1965	Bor	Bori	Earthfill	36.28	1158	2474	138750.00	13506	127420.00	Irrigation	3058
Ghod	1965	Ghod	Pune	Earthfill	29.6	3300	1020	216300.00	30992	154800.00	Irrigation	7419
Tisangi	1966	local	Solapur	Earthfill	20.82	2866		24460.00		22760.00	Irrigation	410
Wunna	1966	Wunna	Nagpur	Earthfill	18.18	2525	390	23560.00	569	21640.00	Irrigation	1326.64
Galhati	1966	Galhati	Jalna	Earthfill	13.1	2987		13840.00			Irrigation	2152
Mangi	1966	Kanola	Solapur	Earthfill	22.95	1475		32720.00		32720.00	Irrigation	2232
Mehakari	1966	Mehakari	Ashti	Earthfill	27.63	1308	163.5	16130.00	38	13000.00	Irrigation	2233
Wan	1966	Wan	Beed	Earthfill	19	2798	1358	25180.00		2190.00	Irrigation	2340
Bhudihal	1966	Belwan	Solapur	Earthfill	18.5	2975		32050.00		27950.00	Irrigation	2350
Nawegaonbandh	1967	local	Gondia	Earthfill	11.58	625		45943.00	10344	29590.00	Irrigation	124.2
Pandherbodi	1967	local	Umrer	Earthfill	15.24	1769	284	13860.00	425	13120.00	Irrigation	432
Kurje (Dhapcheri)	1967	local	Palghar	Earthfill	22.96	2507.76	846.12	39050.00	5620	38085.00	Irrigation; Water Supply	598
Nalganga	1967	Nalganga	Buldhana	Earthfill	29.8	2516	1500	71860.00	10980	70540.00	Irrigation	2158
Sukhana	1968	Sukhana	Chhatrapati Sambhaji Nagar	Earthfill	16.92	3536	68	21340.00	6782	18480.00	Irrigation	2101
Kurnur	1968	Bori	Dharashiv	Earthfill	23.7	1206	45	35240.00	570	32670.00	Irrigation	2190
Manar	1968	Manar	Nanded	Earthfill	27	2592	1557	139000.00	2559	128700.00	Irrigation	8778
Yeldari	1968	Purna	Parbhani	Earthfill	51.2	4232		934310.00	101540	809660.00	Irrigation; Hydroelectricity	10477
Anjani	1970	Anjani	Jalgaon	Earthfill	15.06	4216	213	61170.00		61170.00	Irrigation; Water Supply	888
Siddheshwar	1968	Purna	Hingoli	Earthfill	38.26	6353.2	907.2	250850.00	40580	80940.00	Irrigation	10789
Kundrala	1969	local	Nanded	Earthfill	18.5	999	370	14680.00	253	12990.00	Irrigation	811
Gharni	1969	Gharni	Sirur	Earthfill	15.24	956		25080.00		22460.00	Irrigation	1882
Dolwahal (Weir)	1969	Kundlika	Raigad	Earthfill	12.5	543	1943	10070.00	3230	1840.00	Irrigation; Water Supply	3030
Girna	1969	Girna	Nandgaon	Earthfill	54.56	963.17	2042	608980.00	60040	525920.00	Irrigation; Hydroelectricity	8433
Malangaon	1970	Kan	Dhule	Earthfill	23.78	1141	500	13023.00	248	11325.00	Irrigation	1075
Karwand	1970	Arunanadi	Sirpur	Earthfill	39.3	2966	1191	33840.00		31500.00	Irrigation	2461
Itiadoh	1970	Garvi	Arjuni	Earthfill; Gravity	29.85	505	911	288830.00	46910	225120.00	Irrigation; Hydroelectricity	3230
Sirpur	1970	Bagh	Deori	Earthfill; Gravity	24.69	2840	1195	203840.00	32970	192520.00	Irrigation	3633
Pujaritola	1970	Bagh	Gondia	Earthfill; Gravity	19.2	2661	664	65110.00	17650	48690.00	Irrigation	4246.88
Terna	1970	Terna	Dharashiv	Earthfill	15	2651	186	22910.00	380	18630.00	Irrigation	
Morna	1971	local	Parbhani	Earthfill	28.65	600	1109	44740.00	4930	41460.00	Irrigation	1631
Dyanganga	1971	Dyanganga	Buldhana	Earthfill	35.73	639	1380	36270.00	4151	33930.00	Irrigation	1742
Upper Pus (Pus)	1971	Pus	Yavatmal	Earthfill	42	744	1980	113920.00	8953	91260.00	Irrigation	4007
Malkhed	1972	Kholad	Amravati	Earthfill	17.05	1422	481	10900.00	6717	8960.00	Irrigation; Water Supply	1108
Tanajisagar (Panshet)	1972	Ambi	Pune	Earthfill; Gravity	63.56	1039	4190	303000.00	15645	294000.00	Irrigation; Water supply	1162.4
Pawana	1972	Pawana	Pune	Earthfill; Gravity	42.37	1329	1989	30500.00	2365	241000.00	Hydroelectricity; Water supply	1250
Kalyangirija	1972	Kalyangirija	Jalna	Earthfill	22.07	1183	520	10160.00	568	8469.00	Irrigation	1310
Bhojapur	1972	Mahalungi	Nashik	Earthfill	32.41	733	449	13730.00	3352	10700.00	Irrigation	1488
Saikheda	1972	Khuni	Yavatmal	Earthfill	23.77	1740	909	38511.00	836	27184.00	Irrigation	2671
Mula	1972	Mula	Ahmadnagar	Earthfill; Gravity	48.17	2856	7594	736320.00	53600	608890.00	Irrigation	5947
Upper Vaitarana	1973	Vaitarna	Nashik	Earthfill; Gravity	41	2531	1520	331630.00	37130	331000.00	Irrigation	1440
Panzara	1973	Panzara	Dhule	Earthfill	33.5	1430	1597	43500.00	5590	35800.00	Irrigation	1768
Yeralwadi	1973	Yerala	Satara	Earthfill	19.5	2115	663	33020.00		18060.00	Irrigation	2083
Manyad	1973	Manyad	Jalgaon	Earthfill	45	1677	896.5	53980.00	8710	40257.00	Irrigation	3755
Chulbandh	1974	Chulbandh	Gondia	Earthfill	22.08	465	130	21458.00	3750	16540.00	Irrigation	846.11
Dhamna	1974	local	Jalna	Earthfill	13	2560	443	10730.00	433	8490.00	Irrigation	1414
Dina	1974	Dina	Charmoshi	Earthfill	21.49	3137	957	61150.00	13765	55940.00	Irrigation	1671
Kanoli	1974	Bori	Dhule	Earthfill	24.5	459	290	11900.00	217	8450.00	Irrigation	1840
Nazare	1974	Karha	Pune	Earthfill	22.54	2021	1010	22316.00	3890	16650.00	Irrigation; Water Supply	2425
Karanjwan	1974	Kadwa	Nashik	Earthfill	39.31	2483	1960	175580.00	18420	166220.00	Irrigation	2724
Katepurna	1974	Katepurna	Akola	Earthfill	29.5	2000	693	97670.00	12430	86350.00	Irrigation; Water Supply	2783
Kolkewadi	1975	Local Nallah	Ratnagiri	Gravity	64	497	576	36220.00	167	11220.00	Hydroelectricity	1081
Nirguna	1975	Nirguna	Akola	Earthfill	25.7	1800	124	32290.00	4760	28840.00	Irrigation	1678
Karpara	1975	Karpara	Parbhani	Earthfill	16.66	1046	344	27320.00	778	24700.00	Irrigation	2033
Palkhed	1975	Kadva	Nashik	Earthfill	34.75	4110	1228	230100.00	5760	212400.00	Irrigation	4592
Kanholibara	1976	Krishna	Nagpur	Earthfill	21.05	1365	115.3	22213.00	333	19820.00	Irrigation	1141
Vir Baji Pasalkar(Varasgaon)	1976	Mosi	Pune	Earthfill; Gravity	63.4	785	10550	374000.00	24200	275000.00	Irrigation; Hydroelectricity	1416
Alwandi	1976	Vaitarna	Nashik	Earthfill	37.8	2548	930	353750.00	37130	331110.00	Irrigation	1420
Adhala	1976	Adhala	Akola	Earthfill	40	623	1437	30000.00	2306	27600.00	Irrigation	1582
Tiru	1976	Tiru	Dharashiv	Earthfill	21	1851	311	23320.00	690	15401.00	Irrigation	1985
Kamthikhairy (Pench)	1976	Pench	Nagpur	Earthfill	32	1876	4928	230000.00	23653	180000.00	Irrigation; Water Supply	12000
Jayakwadi	1976	Godavari	Chhatrapati Sambhaji Nagar	Earthfill	41.3	10415	13410	2909000.00	39800	2170000.00	Irrigation; Hydroelectricity	18153
Jakapur	1977	local	Latur	Earthfill	14.8	2257	322	10176.00			Irrigation	1305
Pargaon Ghatshil	1977	Kinha	Pargaon Ghatshil	Earthfill	22.46	911.65	297	12450.00	3740		Irrigation	1467
Dhom	1977	Krishna	Satara	Earthfill; Gravity	50	2478	6335	382270.00	2498	331100.00	Irrigation; Hydroelectricity	1778.29
Suki	1977	Suki	Khiroda	Earthfill	42	716	1430	50170.00	366	39860.00	Irrigation	2336
Hingani (Pangaon)	1977	Bhogawati	Solapur	Earthfill	21.87	2193	74	45510.00		31970.00	Irrigation	2435
Yedgaon	1977	Kukadi	Pune	Earthfill; Gravity	29.74	4511	1004	93430.00	1700	79270.00	Irrigation	3844
Bori	1977	Bori	Parola	Earthfill	20	3365	5534	40960.00	8460	25020.00	Irrigation	4206
Adan	1977	Aran	Washim	Earthfill; Rockfill	30.13	755	1428	78320.00	10520	67250.00	Irrigation	4623
Januna	1978	local	Akola	Earthfill	11.95	390	150	11310.00	404	1180.00	Irrigation	260
Makardhokada	1978	Amb	Umrer	Earthfill	18.81	1645	652.87	21356.00	322	19931.00	Irrigation	450
Matoba	1978	Bhima	Pune	Earthfill	17.5	1662	45.6	45200.00	1900	37100.00	Irrigation	476
Tulshi	1978	Tulshi	Kolhapur	Earthfill; Gravity	48.68	1512	25	98290.00	533	89910.00	Irrigation; Hydroelectricity	640
Khandeshar	1978	Vali	Dharashiv	Earthfill	17.14	1257	305	10840.00	3000	8820.00	Irrigation	800
Karadkhed	1978	local	Nanded	Earthfill	19	1454	498	12000.00	289	10980.00	Irrigation	1148
Ambadi	1978	Sivana	Chhatrapati Sambhaji Nagar	Earthfill	20	2210	707	12000.00		9420.00	Irrigation	1412
Barvi	1978	Kalyanthane	Thane	Earthfill	48.78	746		178580.00	0.04	176940.00	Water Supply	1585
Waghadi	1978	Waghadi	Yavatmal	Earthfill; Gravity	26	960	773	41110.00	6580	35360.00	Irrigation	1815
Aner	1978	Aner	Shivpur	Earthfill	47	2275	3162	103270.00		58914.00	Irrigation	4318
Waghad	1979	Kalwan	Nashik	Earthfill	45.6	952	1783	76480.00	526	70000.00	Irrigation	1610
Koradi	1979	Koradi	Buldhana	Earthfill	19.31	900	1193	22500.00	6465	15120.00	Irrigation	2446
Kawadas (Pickup)	1979	local	Palghar	Earthfill	28.08	630	180	13700.00	5480	9970.00	Irrigation	3700
Mandohol	1979	Mandohol	Ahilya Nagar	Earthfill	27.07	739	426	11300.00	199.51	8780.00	Irrigation	11420
Pethwadaj	1980	local	Nanded	Earthfill	19.5	1260	495	11600.00	2970	9040.00	Irrigation	1185
Haranbari	1980	Mosam	Satana	Earthfill	34	1419	2375	34780.00	5540	33020.00	Irrigation	1312
Kelzar	1981	Aram	Satana	Earthfill	32.5	1236	1622	17100.00	1660	16210.00	Irrigation	832.4
Uma	1981	Uma	Akola	Earthfill	20.42	2140	434	14010.00	2600	11690.00	Irrigation	1340
Sonal	1981	Aran		Earthfill	19.6	1114	698	20270.00		16920.00	Irrigation	1368
Masoli	1981	Masoli		Earthfill	24.84	1086	626	34080.00	6970	27390.00	Irrigation	2028
Goki	1981	Goki	Yavatmal	Earthfill; Gravity	23.06	1572	658	50220.00	11360	42710.00	Irrigation; Water supply	2066
Yelavi	1982	local	Sangli	Earthfill	15.25	764	111	22260.00		2180.00	Irrigation	557
Rangawali	1982	Rangawali	Dhule	Earthfill	25.63	1878	1289	15020.00	329	12890.00	Irrigation	1168
Ozarkhed	1982	Unanda	Nashik	Earthfill	35.3	3266	2052	67950.00	6880	60320.00	Irrigation	1610
Tawarja	1982	Tawarja	Latur	Earthfill	14.3	2222	361	20520.00	741	16950.00	Irrigation	1903
Tillari (Proj.)	1982	Tillari	Sindhudurg	Earthfill; Gravity	73	943	9274	462170.00	16250	447290.00	Irrigation; Water supply	2465
Manjara	1982	Manjara	Beed	Earthfill	25	4203	2213	250700.00		173320.00	Irrigation	6000
Isapur	1982	Penganga	Nanded	Earthfill	57	4120.1	11216	1254000.00		951000.00	Irrigation	10480
Hatnur	1982	Tapi	Jalgaon	Earthfill	25.5	2580	3850	388000.00	48160	255000.00	Irrigation	26415
Chandai	1983	Chandai Nalla	Chandrapur	Earthfill	11.91	1830	181	13200.00	523	10690.00	Irrigation	842.85
Alandi	1983	Alandi	Nashik	Earthfill	29.3	1690	2782	29600.00	55900	27820.00	Irrigation	1002
Borna	1983	Borna	Beed	Earthfill	22.3	866	460	10908.00	2191	9060.00	Irrigation	1249
Wadaj	1983	Meena	Pune	Earthfill; Gravity	30.7	1875	1009	36000.00	467	33200.00	Irrigation	1426
Chargaon	1983	Chargaon	Varora	Earthfill	14.4	3065	428	21700.00	12921.9	19866.00	Irrigation	1450.5
Pothara	1983	Pothara	Yavatmal	Earthfill	14.21	2220	318	38400.00	13900	34720.00	Irrigation	1732
Burai	1983	Burai	Dhule	Earthfill	30.6	1013	168	21330.00	31440	14210.00	Irrigation	2149
Erai	1983	Erai	Chandrapur	Earthfill; Gravity	30	1620	985	226500.00	58000	193000.00	Water supply	2610
Bhatsa	1983	Bhatsa	Thane	Earthfill; Gravity	88.5	959	18250	976150.00	2725	942115.00	Irrigation; Water supply	5342
Lower Pus	1983	Pus		Earthfill	28	3346	6167	81160.00	15890	59630.00	Irrigation	5437
Natuwadi	1984	Tr.of Charti		Earthfill	45.25	900	22.3	28080.00	2000	27230.00	Irrigation	690.73
Manikdoh	1984	Kukadi	Pune	Gravity	51.8	930	596	308060.00	18434	283070.00	Irrigation; Hydroelectricity	1439
Kolar	1984	Kolar	Nagpur	Earthfill	30.11	2910	1084	35380.00	6430	31320.00	Irrigation	1598.2
Kordi	1985	Kordi	Nandurbar	Earthfill	27.75	1952	923	11690.00	1677	10300.00	Irrigation	735
Amalocalalla	1985	Amalocalalla	Chandrapur	Earthfill	37.75	1607	133.4	22700.00	3703	21200.00	Irrigation	1067
Morna (Shirala)	1985	Morna	Kolhapur	Earthfill	31.2	1115	793	21160.00	3203	15150.00	Irrigation	1075
Tillari (Main)	1986	Tillari	Kolhapur	Gravity	38.05	485	250	113266.00	9290	92020.00	Hydroelectricity	1028
Kalyan	1986	Kalyan	Jalna	Earthfill	16.49	1554	492	15360.00	533	10360.00	Irrigation	1315
Girija	1986	Girija	Aurangabad	Earthfill	19.1	3060	70	24500.00	775	21230.00	Irrigation	1649
Ujani	1980	Bhima	Solapur	Earthfill	56.4	2534		3140000.00	337000.00	1440000.00	Irrigation	15717
Kundlika	1986	Kundlika	Beed	Earthfill	28.45	1403		46350.00	6850		Irrigation	2751
Kanher	1986	Wenna	Satara	Earthfill; Gravity	50.34	1954	6308	286000.00	18.63	271680.00	Irrigation; Hydroelectricity	3203
Sina	1986	Sina	Ahmadnagar	Earthfill	28.5	1580	681.5	67950.00	12834		Irrigation	4450
Dham	1986	Dham	Yavatmal	Earthfill	33.35	1728	2737	72460.00	7780	62510.00	Irrigation	5416.6
Wandri	1987	Wandri	Palghar	Earthfill	29.6	1336	1206	36510.00	4438	34710.00	Irrigation	567
Raigavan	1987	local	Beed	Earthfill	19.74	2090		12703.00	4920	11259.00	Irrigation	1411
Dhamni (Surya)	1987	Surya	Dhamni	Earthfill	59	1563	1270	285310.00	16130	273350.00	Irrigation; Hydroelectricity	2696
Majalgaon	1987	Sindphana	Beed	Earthfill	31.19	6488	5759	453640.00	78130	311300.00	Irrigation; Hydroelectricity	14500
Khekaranalla	1988	KhekaraNalla	Yavatmal	Earthfill	24.5	330	306	26325.00	5566	23810.00	Irrigation	1343
Kalisarar	1988	Kalisarar	Salekasa	Earthfill; Gravity	25.52	830	697	30460.00	6500	27750.00	Irrigation	1402
Khairi	1989	Kar	Ahmadnagar	Earthfill	18.91	1210	54	15110.00	492	13743.00	Irrigation	1962
Totladoh	1989	Pench	Nagpur	Gravity	74.5	680	972	1241109.00	77710	1091000.00	Hydroelectricity	12072
Adol	1990	Adola	Borala	Earthfill	18.47	1725	479	15270.00	3141		Irrigation	1274
Shahanoor	1990	Shahanoor	AnjangaonSurji	Earthfill	57.81	828	3446	47850.00	2970	46040.00	Irrigation; Water Supply	2406
Lower Wunna (Nand)	1990	Nand	Nagpur	Earthfill; Gravity	16.25	2513	1833	62182.00	21642	53182.00	Irrigation	5238
Nagyasakya	1992	Panzan	Nandgaon	Earthfill	23.09	1440	292	15620.00	4050	11240.00	Irrigation	51.55
Sakol	1992	local	Latur, Udgir	Earthfill	17.65	1425	371	12689.00	4256	10950.00	Irrigation	1178
Borgaon	1993	local	Yavatmal	Earthfill	20	830	1404	14040.00	288	12224.00	Irrigation	686
Pakadiguddam	1993	Deogad	Chandrapur	Earthfill	19	1814	1067	13307.00	2579	11800.00	Irrigation	803
Devarjan	1993	Devari	Latur, Udgir	Earthfill	15.58	1715		13410.00	4010	10670.00	Irrigation	1136
Upper Wardha	1993	Wardha	Amrawati	Earthfill; Gravity	46.2	5920	6500	786480.00	93122	614800.00	Irrigation; Hydroelectricity; Water supply	19457
Bokani	1994	local	Latur, Udgir	Earthfill	17.03	1440		13460.00	3170	8590.00	Irrigation	1258.8
Benitura	1994	local	Latur, Omerga	Earthfill	13.48	1780		12810.00			Irrigation	1614
Sakat	1994	Dudhana	Osmanabad, Paranda	Earthfill	19.8	2775		14430.00	4340	13440.00	Irrigation	1686
Tembhapuri	1994	Nagzari	Aurangabad	Earthfill	16.42	5300	809	21260.00	8495	19000.00	Irrigation	2038
Arunawati	1994	Arunawati	Yavatmal, Digras	Earthfill; Gravity	29.5	5170	4412	198395.00	39290	169675.00	Irrigation	8525
Waldevi	1995	Waldevi	Nashik	Earthfill	36.4	1890	1304	33720.00	3437	32050.00	Irrigation	809
Tisgaon	1995	Parashri	Nashik, Dindori	Earthfill	24.9	1674	1080	15140.00	292	12440.00	Irrigation	1744
Mukane	1995	Aaundha	Nandurbar	Earthfill	26.93	1530	2271	214160.00	3018	203970.00	Irrigation	1938
Masalga	1996	local	Latur, Nilanga	Earthfill	10.26	2023		14670.00	3696		Irrigation	996
Vishwamitri	1996	Vishwamitri	Patur	Earthfill	21.06	1275	565	10116.00	1766		Irrigation	1332
Jam	1996	Jam	Nagpur	Earthfill	24	3460	107	28050.00	7565	23550.00	Irrigation	1564
Kadwa	1997	Kadwa	Nashik	Earthfill	31.84	1660	1245	59590.00	6705	52910.00	Irrigation	2821
Bahula	1997	Bahula	Bhandara	Earthfill	17	5280	847	20030.00	581	16330.00	Irrigation	3802
Lower Wunna (Wadgaon)	1997	Wadgaon	Nagpur	Earthfill; Gravity	23.65	5330	2998	152600.00	36138	136000.00	Irrigation	10877
Kashypi	1998	Kashyapi	Rajapur	Earthfill	41.75	1291	2761	52690.00	2867	52430.00	Irrigation	799
Purnaneopur	1998	Purna	Chhatrapati Sambhaji Nagar	Earthfill	16.6	2725	506	11380.00	3848	9340.00	Irrigation	1184
Punegaon	1998	Unanda	Sangli, Tasgaon	Earthfill	24.14	1803	991	20399.00	3646	17750.00	Irrigation	1332
Sonwad	1998	Sonwad	Sindkheda	Earthfill	18.58	4699	614	12690.00	3434	9530.00	Irrigation	1349
Narangi	1998	local	Chhatrapati Sambhaji Nagar	Earthfill	16.5			13290.00			Irrigation	2296
Bor Dahegaon	1998	local	Chhatrapati Sambhaji Nagar	Earthfill	16.7			13400.00			Irrigation	2510
Mun	1998	Mun	Buldhana	Earthfill	30.2	1466	1362	42480.00	4527	36830.00	Irrigation	3623
Awashi	1999	local	Ratnagiri	Earthfill	36.51	350	894	11151.00	831	10440.00	Irrigation	221.18
Vadiwale	1999	Kundali	Pune	Earthfill	29	485.64	8.73	40870.00	3558	30390.00	Irrigation	746.82
Anjanapalshi	1999	Anjana	Chhatrapati Sambhaji Nagar	Earthfill	19.4	1952	937	15550.00	3887	13740.00	Irrigation	1167
Pimpalgaon Joge	1999	AR Pushpawati	Pune	Earthfill	28.6	1560	2010	235520.00	263000	110240.00	Irrigation	1943.7
Savatri	1999	Savatri	Ratnagiri	Gravity	33.62	320	196	29450.00	2700	26360.00	Water supply	3919.79
Temghar	2000	Mutha	Pune	Earthfill; Gravity	42.5	1075	1188	107900.00	55512	101010.00	Irrigation	626.5
Dongargaon	2000	local	Rajura	Earthfill	23	572	285	14180.00	3757	12440.00	Irrigation	840
Hetwane	2000	Bhogeshwari	Raigad	Earthfill	48.2	675	144980	147490.00	6740	137625.00	Irrigation; Water Supply	1084
Gunjwani	2000	Kanand	Pune	Earthfill; Gravity	52.82	1730	6871	104690.00	6410	104480.00	Irrigation	1175
Chilewadi	2000	Mandvi	Pune	Earthfill	62.56	440	36.23	27170.00	67410	24610.00	Irrigation	1680
Nira Devghar	2000	Nira	Pune	Earthfill	58.53	2430	99.38	337390.00	14307	332130.00	Irrigation	1852
Kar	2000	Kar	Wardha	Earthfill	25.13	1067	265.06	25960.00	4480	21060.00	Irrigation	2314
Dimbhe	2000	Ghod	Pune	Gravity	67.21	852	1151.23	38220.00	17547	35391.00	Irrigation	2872
Bhama Asakhed	2000	Bhama	Pune	Earthfill	51	1425	6183	230473.00	21630	217100.00	Irrigation	3431.72
Wan	2000	Wan	Akola	Earthfill; Gravity	67.65	500	599	83465.00	4391	81955.00	Irrigation; Hydroelectricity; Water supply	3874
Berdewadi	2001	local	Lanja	Earthfill	61.19	656	1796.2	15841.00	871	15356.00	Irrigation	296
Chitri	2001	Chitri	Kolhapur	Earthfill	55.1	1710	2606	53414.00	2931	52359.00	Irrigation	571
Uttarmand	2001	Uttarmand	Satara	Earthfill	46.45	1389		24925.00	2393		Irrigation	824
Jamkhedi	2001	Jamkhedi	Dhule	Earthfill	29.62	1750	710	14450.00	2081	12290.00	Irrigation	1113
Bhivargi	2001	Patan	Sangli	Earthfill	15.85	1606		11200.00		8630.00	Irrigation	
Madan	2002	Waghadinalla	Arvi	Earthfill	26.55	1291	976.14	11460.00		10460.00	Irrigation	662.5
Babhulgaon	2003	local	Solapur	Earthfill	16.93	16.5	56100	56100.00	2270		Irrigation	1046
Chargad	2003	Chargad	Amravati	Earthfill	24.5	3740	1095	12005.00	2842	8266.00	Irrigation; Water Supply	1107.5
Andra Valley	2003	Andra	Pune	Earthfill	40.45	330	207.86	83310.00	7421	82750.00	Irrigation	1110
Pentakali	2003	Penganga	Buldhana	Earthfill	27.5	990	694.35	67355.00	12870	59976.00	Irrigation	6476
Kudnur	2005	local	Kolhapur	Earthfill	20.99	316	208.68	11925.00	214	1062.00	Irrigation	58.24
Deogad	2005	Karli Nalla	Phonda	Earthfill	54.68	1784	6200	100428.00	5731	98020.00	Irrigation; Hydroelectricity	2078
Shivana Takli	2005	Shivna	Chhatrapati Sambhaji Nagar	Earthfill	17.7	4524	622	39360.00	887	38190.00	Irrigation	4415
Popatkhed	2005	Dather	Akola	Earthfill	42.6			12192.00		10709.00	Irrigation	
Morbe	2006	Dhavari	Khalapur	Gravity	59.1	3420	18075	19089.00	9780	160.01	Water supply	690.4
Lalocalalla	2006	local	Samudrapur	Earthfill	13.9	3385	407.67	29515.00	9039	27613.00	Irrigation	925
Morana (Gureghar)	2006	Morana	Satara	Earthfill	47.02	420		39550.00	31.27	36990.00	Irrigation	1360.11
Tarandale	2007	local	Sindhudurg	Earthfill	48	400		10800.00		9810.00		147.7
Kalmodi	2007	Arala	Khed	Gravity	40.6	104	139.28	42670.00	2710	42670.00	Irrigation	963.21
Sina Kolegaon	2007	Sina	Dharashiv	Earthfill	36.6		234	150490.00	1529	89340.00	Irrigation	7689
Katangi		Katanginalla	Goregaon	Earthfill	13.65	2360	464.12	11120.00	31.02	9400.00	Irrigation	845.5
Bham		Tapi	Dharni	Earthfill; Gravity	67.5	10982		378,000.00	1551.6	378,000.00	Irrigation	445
Sarang Kheda		Waki	Nashik	Earthfill	34.5	1081	76.2	75800.00	7203	70550.00	Irrigation	563
Chenna		Chenna	Gadchiroli	Earthfill	33	740	413	14800.00	1930	14790.00	Irrigation	602
Madan		local	Madan	Earthfill	26.5	1413	773	11460.00		10560.00	Irrigation	662
Godavari		Darna	Nashik	Earthfill	34.75	1028	3007	46730.00	2565	40790.00	Irrigation	662
Karwappa		Karwappa	Gadchiroli	Earthfill	35	1416	991	32560.00	4454	32560.00	Irrigation	841
Manikpuri		Waki	Nandurbar	Earthfill	42.84	888	1453	14760.00	650	13450.00	Irrigation	912
Lower Tapi		Kadwa	Nashik	Earthfill	21.8	860	303.72	16460.00	3150	11470.00	Irrigation	983
Bhavali		Bham	Thane	Earthfill	33.97	1550	329	75050.00	4980	69760.00	Irrigation	990
Jamkhed		local	Nanded	Earthfill	16.9	1605	44	10230.00		8150.00	Irrigation	1019
Nagan		Nagan	Nandurbar	Earthfill	29.24	2940	1800	25150.00	3334	22760.00	Irrigation	1103
Talamba		Karli	Sindhudurg	Earthfill	57.41	2955	7343	308750.00	21350	285630.00	Irrigation; Hydroelectricity	1354.47
Wakod		Nagzari	Chhatrapati Sambhaji Nagar	Earthfill	14.28	2975	577	12050.00	4480	11400.00	Irrigation	1380
Mahamadwadi		Gad river	Konakwadi	Earthfill	59.33	1590	12000	93374.00	4243	91399.00	Irrigation; Hydroelectricity	1678
Lower Panzara (Akkalp)		Punad	Nashik	Earthfill	33.28	706	1114	39750.00	3123	36990.00	Irrigation	1791
Waki		Godavari	Jalgaon	Earthfill	51.87	869	4582	53730.00	2054	53340.00	Irrigation	1808
Dara		Shiwan	Nandurbar	Earthfill	31.3	4828	2410	24180.00	2070	21700.00	Irrigation; Water Supply	1864
Upper Kadwa		Manyad	Nandgaon	Earthfill	32.92	1470	471.66	14010.00	238	9460.00	Irrigation	2032
Gomai		Gomai	Nandurbar	Earthfill	23.9	5596	1391	28104.00	5920	20352.00	Irrigation	2049
Utawali		Utawali	Buldhana	Earthfill	26.05	2112	1910	20808.00	3642		Irrigation	2336
Chandrabhaga		Chandrabhaga	Amravati	Earthfill	44.7	1573	2952	41427.00	3262	41248.00	Irrigation; Hydroelectricity; Water supply	2476
Tultuli		Khobragadi	Gadchiroli	Earthfill	21.59	5280	2745	225051.00	50920	216948.00	Irrigation	3460
Purna		Purna	Amravati	Earthfill	38	3120	1277	41759.00	5880	35370.00	Irrigation; Hydroelectricity; Water supply	3906
Anjneri		Panzara	Dhule	Earthfill	32.3	3137	4326	107790.00	14815	87870.00	Irrigation	4332
Nawatha		Burai	Dhule	Earthfill	29	2610	1427	36930.00	7360	33910.00	Irrigation	4342
Human		Human	Chandrapur	Earthfill; Gravity	28	3222	2448	313731.00	80930	313731.00	Irrigation	9242
Prakasha Barrage		Tapi	Nandurbar	Earthfill	39.5	1070	179	325000.00	3850	248210.00	Irrigation	16071
Lower Wardha		Wardha	Wardha	Earthfill; Gravity	27.8	9464	2639	253340.00	54654	216870.00	Irrigation	20788
Dhaner		Tapi	Burhanpur	Gravity	27.7	425		141000.00	170	141000.00	Irrigation	21083
Nanduri		Tapi	Ama Local Nallaher	Earthfill; Gravity	20	2186	1381.25	42056.00	575.36	35780.00	Irrigation; Water supply	49299.5
Sulwade Barrage		Tapi	Nandurbar	Earthfill	27.73	688	226	63640.00	11870	62110.00	Irrigation	50517
Wadishewadi		Tapi	Nandurbar	Earthfill	36.5	614.5	324	92190.00	18230	91810.00	Irrigation	50529
Dehali		Tapi	Dhule	Earthfill	28.26	5349	1762	65060.00	1229	65060.00	Irrigation; Water Supply	64227
Gose Khurd Dam	2008	Wainganga	Bhandara	Earthfill	22.50	11356	3828	769483.00	22258	376592.00	Irrigation	67300
Punad		Delhi	Nandurbar	Earthfill	29.62	1820	123	19080.00	2202	17290.00	Irrigation	
Kalammawadi		Dudhaganga	Kolhapur	Earthfill	73.08	1280	679.0	679000.0		679000.0	Irrigation, Hydroelectric	
Lower Dudhana Dam	2013	Dudhana	Parbhani	Earthfill	31.11	6581	372	342200.00	2422	242200.00	Irrigation	44482

== See also ==
- Famine in India

== Notes ==
- Sakhare, V.B.2005. "Reservoir fisheries of Maharashtra." Fishing Chimes. 23(7):34-37
- Sakhare, V.B.2007. Reservoir Fisheries and Limnology, Narendra Publishing House, Delhi
- Sakhare, V.B.2007. Applied Fisheries. Daya Publishing House, Delhi
- Kalammawadi dam at kolhapurtourism
- Kalammawadi dam at industryabout
- Mapping, locations, statistical data; diversion of flow from east to west, reservoirs on different scales from Nathsagar to tanks system of Bhandara, Pazar talav, seasonal flow patterns and as they are modified by bunding and lifting of water
