= Nagyasakya Dam =

- Location within Maharashtra
- Official name: Nagyasakya Dam D02922
- Location: Nandgaon
- Coordinates: 20.346861°N 74.6040806°E
- Opening date: 1992
- Owners: Government of Maharashtra, India

Dam and spillways
- Type of dam: Earthfill
- Impounds: Panzan river
- Height: 23.09 m (75.8 ft)
- Length: 1,440 m (4,720 ft)
- Dam volume: 292 km^{3} (70 cu mi)

Reservoir
- Total capacity: 11,240 km^{3} (2,700 cu mi)
- Surface area: 4,050 km^{2} (1,560 sq mi)

Nagyasakya Dam, is an earthfill dam on Panzan river near Nandgaon, Nashik district in the state of Maharashtra in India.

== Specifications ==
The height of the dam above lowest foundation is 23.09 m (75.8 ft) while the length is 1,440 m (4,720 ft). The volume content is 292 km^{3} (70 cu mi) and gross storage capacity is 15,620.00 km^{3} (3,747.44 cu mi).

== Purpose ==
- Irrigation

== See also ==
- Dams in Maharashtra
- List of reservoirs and dams in India
