= List of dams and reservoirs in India =

This page shows the state-wise list of dams and reservoirs in India. As of July, 2019, total number of large dams in India is 5,334. About 447 large dams are under construction in India. In terms of number of dams, India ranks third after China and the United States.

== Andhra Pradesh ==
Dam/Reservoir	River	Location	Type	Height	Length	No. of gates	Storage capacity (tmcft)	Reservoir area (km2)	Year of completion	Purpose
Dowleswaram Barrage	Godavari River	Rajahmundry, East Godavari district, Andhra Pradesh	Barrage	4.572 m (15 ft)	5,837 m (19,150 ft)	186	5.14 tmcft (including dead storage)	63.5 km2	1850	Irrigation & Water supply
Jalaput Dam	Godavari River	Jalaput village, Alluri Sitharama Raju district, Andhra Pradesh	Gravity & Masonry dam	60.65 m (199 ft)	419 m (1,375 ft)	10	34.273 tmcft	97.12 km2	2000	Hydroelectric & Irrigation
Polavaram Dam	Godavari River	Polavaram, Eluru district, Andhra Pradesh	Earth-fill & Masonry dam	39.28 m (129 ft)	2,914 m (9,560 ft)	48	194 tmcft	600 km2	Under construction	Hydroelectric, Irrigation & Water supply
Prakasham Barrage	Krishna River	Vijayawada, NTR district, Andhra Pradesh	Barrage	3.66 m (12 ft)	1,223.5 m (4,014 ft)	70	3 tmcft	30.36 km2	1855	Irrigation & Water supply
Nagarjuna Sagar Dam	Krishna River	Nagarjuna Sagar, Palnadu district, Andhra Pradesh	Earth-fill & Masonry dam	124 m (407 ft)	1,550 m (5,085 ft)	26	312 tmcft	181.051 km2	1967	Hydroelectric & Irrigation
Nagarjuna Sagar tail pond	Krishna River	Nagarjuna Sagar, Palnadu district, Andhra Pradesh	Earth-fill & Masonry dam	62.48 m (205 ft)	10 m (33 ft)		6 tmcft	120.67 km2	2014	Irrigation & Water supply
Srisailam Dam	Krishna River	Sri Sailam, Nandyal district, Andhra Pradesh	Gravity & Masonry dam	145.10 m (476 ft)	512 m (1,680 ft)	13	216 tmcft	200 km2	1981	Hydroelectric, Irrigation & Water supply
Nallamalasagar Reservoir	Krishna River	Prakasham district, Andhra Pradesh	Earth-fill	11.7 m (38 ft)			43.5 tmcft		Under construction	Irrigation & Water supply
Telugu Ganga	Krishna River	Atmakur, Kurnool district, Andhra Pradesh							2004	Irrigation & Water supply
Gandikota Reservoir	Penna River	Kadapa, Kadapa district, Andhra Pradesh					26.85 tmcft		2013	Irrigation & Water supply
Sunkesula Barrage	Tungabhadra River	Kurnool, Kurnool district, Andhra Pradesh	Barrage	163 m (535 ft)	1,300 m (4,265 ft)	30	1.25 tmcft	60 km2	1861	Irrigation & Water supply
Velgodu Reservoir	Tungabhadra River	Velgodu, Kurnool district, Andhra Pradesh					10.14 tmcft			
Handri Neeva Project	Tungabhadra River									
Alaganur Reservoir	Tungabhadra River									
Rajolibanda	Tungabhadra River									
Sangam Barrage	Penna River									
Mylavaram Dam	Penna River						9.98 tmcft			
Somasila Dam	Penna River	Somasila village, Nellore district, Andhra Pradesh	Earth-fill & Gravity dam	128 ft	760 m (2,493 ft)		78 tmcft		1989	Irrigation & Water supply
PABR Dam	Penna River						9.78 tmcft		2002	
MPR Dam	Penna River									
Chitravathi Reservoir	Penna River									
Cheyyeru Reservoir	Penna River									
Nellore anicut	Penna River									
Veligallu Dam Reservoir	Papagni River									
Gundlakamma Reservoir	Gundlakamma River									
Jeedipalli Reservoir	Handri River									
Brahmamsagar Dam	Handri River									
Thandava Dam	Thandava River									
Upper Sileru Dam	Sabari River									
Donkarayi Project	Sabari River									
Kandaleru Dam	Kandaleru River						68 tmcft			
Gandipalem Project	Manneru River									
Tatipudi Reservoir	Gosthani River									
Yeleru Reservoir	Yeleru River									
Kanithi Reservoir	Yeleru River									
Gotta Barrage	Vamsadhara River									
Kalyani Dam	Swarnamukhi River								1977	
Jhanjavati Project	Nagavali River									
Thotapalli Barrage	Nagavali River								2015	
Madduvalasa Reservoir	Nagavali River								2002	
Narayanapuram Project	Nagavali River									

== Arunachal Pradesh ==
River	Dam	Height	Length	Type	Storage capacity	Reservoir area	Year of completion
Ranganadi River	Ranganadi	68 m (223 ft)	344.75 m (1,131 ft)	Gravity	21,280 m^{3} (17 acre⋅ft)	1,600,000 m^{2} (395 acres)	2003
Dibang	Dibang	288 m		Concrete gravity			Under Construction

== Assam ==
River	Dam	Height	Length	Type	Storage capacity	Reservoir area	Status
Pagladiya River	Pagladia	26.2 m (86 ft)	230 m (755 ft)	Rock-fill			In progress
Kopili	Khandong	66 m (217 ft)	243 m (797 ft)	Gravity			Completed
Umrong Nalah	Umrong	30 m (98 ft)	143 m (469 ft)	Gravity			Completed
Subansiri	Subansiri Lower Dam	130 m (427 ft)	284 m (932 ft)	Gravity	1.365 km^{3} (1,106,624 acre⋅ft)	33.5 km^{2} (8,278 acres)	In progress
Borpani River	Karbi Langpi Dam	35 m (115 ft)	197 m (646 ft)	Gravity			Completed

== Chhattisgarh ==
River	Dam	Height	Length	Type	Storage capacity	Reservoir area	Year of completion
Arpa	Khutaghat Reservoir						1930
Mahanadi	Dudhawa Dam	24.53 m	2,906.43 m				1964
Mahanadi	Gangrel Dam	30.4 5 m	1,800 m	Embankment, earth-fill	910,500,000 m³	95 km^{2}	1979
Hasdev	Minimata Hasdeo Bango	87 m (285 ft)	2,509.5 m (8,233 ft)	Earth-fill & Gravity	3,416,000,000 m^{3} (2,769,396 acre⋅ft)	18,490,000 m^{2} (4,569 acres)	1990
Kotri	Kherkatta Reservoir	20 m	610 m	Embankment, earth-fill	2,955,000 m³		1981
Shivnath	Mongra Barrage						2008
Sillari River	Murrum Silli Dam	34.15 m	2591 m	Embankment, earth-fill	165,340,000 m³	25 km^{2}	1923
Sondur	Sondur Dam						1988
Tandula and Sukh nala	Tandula Dam				312,250,000 m³		1921

== Bihar ==
#	Name	River	Length (m)	Max Height (m)	Basin	Completion Year	Type	District	Purpose
1	Ajay Dam	Ajay	518.3	39.02	Ganga	1989	Earth-fill	Jamui	Irrigation
2	Amrity Dam		166.16	16.65	Ganga	1965	Earth-fill	Jamui	Irrigation
3	Badua Dam	Badua	457.32	56.66	Ganga	1965	Earth-fill	Banka	Irrigation
4	Barnar Dam		282.7	76.75	Ganga	Under Construction	Gravity & Masonry	Jamui	Irrigation
5	Baskund Dam	Baskund	67.07	17.68	Ganga	1984	Earth-fill	Lakhisarai	Irrigation
6	Belharna Dam	Belharna	411.58	30.1	Ganga	1987	Earth-fill	Jamui	Irrigation
7	Bilasi Dam	Bilasi	169.8	19.97	Ganga	2001	Earth-fill	Jamui	Irrigation
8	Chandan Dam	Chandan	1555	40.4	Ganga	1968	Earth-fill	Jamui	Irrigation
9	Durgawati Dam	Durgawati	1615.4	46.3	Ganga	Under Construction	Earth-fill	Kaimur (bhabua)	Irrigation
10	Gaighat Dam	Baghara			Ganga	Proposed	-	Munger	
11	Jalkund Dam	Jalkund	631.1	15.99	Ganga	1968	Earth-fill	Munger	Irrigation
12	Job Dam	Job	1616	18.9	Ganga	1977	Earth-fill	Nawada	Irrigation
13	Kailash Ghati Dam	Kailash Ghati	183	25.9	Ganga	1980	Earth-fill	Jamui	Irrigation
14	Khargpur Lake Dam	Man	221.04	26.53	Ganga	1876	Earth-fill	Munger	Irrigation
15	Kohira Dam	Kohira	265.24	16	Ganga	1962	Earth-fill / Gravity & Masonry	Kaimur (bhabua)	Irrigation
16	Kolmahadeo Dam	Kolmahadev(bhusari)	157	19.2	Ganga	1966	Earth-fill	Nawada	Irrigation
17	Morwy Dam	Morwe	533.53	25.56	Ganga	1960	Earth-fill	Lakhisarai	Irrigation
18	Nagi Dam	Nagi	1884	113.5	Ganga	1958	Earth-fill	Jamui	Irrigation
19	Nakti Dam	Nakti	990.85	23.61	Ganga	1980	Earth-fill	Jamui	Irrigation
20	Orhni Dam	Orni	686	23.774	Ganga	2000	Earth-fill	Jamui	Irrigation
21	Phulwaria Dam	Tilaiya	1135	25.66	Ganga	1988	Earth-fill	Nawada	Irrigation
22	Sindhwarni Dam	Man	125.76	21.34	Ganga	Under Construction	Earth-fill	Munger	Irrigation
23	Srikhandi Dam	Srikhandi	205.8	16.65	Ganga	1965	Earth-fill	Jamui	Irrigation
24	Upper Kiul Dam	Kiul	3673	30.48	Ganga	2004	Earth-fill	Jamui	Irrigation

== Goa ==
River	Dam	Height	Length	Type	Storage capacity	Reservoir area	Complete
Amthane Nala	Amthane	25.21 m (83 ft)	450 m (1,476 ft)	Earth-fill	5,970,000 m^{3} (4,840 acre⋅ft)	680,000 m^{2} (168 acres)	1987
Gunuleni Nala	Anjunem	43 m (141 ft)	185 m (607 ft)	Earth-fill & Gravity	44,830,000 m^{3} (36,344 acre⋅ft)	2,530,000 m^{2} (625 acres)	1989
	Moisal	20 m (66 ft)	230 m (755 ft)	Earth-fill	4,570,000 m^{3} (3,705 acre⋅ft)	530,000 m^{2} (131 acres)	1989
	Chapoli Dam	25.50 m (84 ft)	760 m (2,493 ft)	Earth-fill	9,980,000 m^{3} (8,091 acre⋅ft)	1,100,000 m^{2} (272 acres)	2000
Sanguem	Salaulim	42.70 m (140 ft)	1,004 m (3,294 ft)	Earth-fill & Gravity	234,361,000 m^{3} (190,000 acre⋅ft)	29,640,000 m^{2} (7,324 acres)	2000

== Gujarat ==
Gujarat has over 200 dams with reservoirs that are large enough to be of particular concern in disaster preparedness planning. These include:

River	Dam	Height	Length	Type	Storage capacity	Reservoir area	Complete
Vishwamitri river	Ajwa		5,000 meters				early 20th century
West Banas-Anjana River	Dantiwada Dam	61 meters	4,832 meters				1965
Chaudhari River	Hemil dam						
Mitti River	Mitti Dam		4,405 meters				1983
Rangholi River	Ranghola dam						
Narmada River	Sardar Sarovar Dam	138.68 meters	1,210 m (3,970 ft)	Gravity	9.5 km3	375.33 km2	17 September 2017
Narmada River	Bhadbhut barrage			Barrage			2025
Narmada River	Virangna Lakshmibai Dam	38 meters	4,256 meters	Embankment, earth-fill			1987
Sabarmati River	Dharoi dam	45.87 metres	1,207 metres	Gravity			1978
Tapti River	Ukai Dam	80.772 meters	4,927 m (16,165 ft)			52,000 hac	1972

== Haryana ==
River	Dam	Height	Length	Type	Storage capacity	Reservoir area	Complete	Location
Yamuna	Hathni Kund Barrage		360 m				1999	Yamunanagar district
Yamuna	Palla barrage							Faridabad district
Sahibi River	Masani barrage					500 acre	1989	Masani, Rewari District
Sahibi River	Tajewala Barrage	27.73 m (91.0 ft)	360 m (1,180 ft)				1873	Yamuna Nagar District
Anangpur stream	Anangpur Dam	7m	50m	Gravity			9th century by king Anangpal Tomar	Surajkund, Faridabad
Kaushalya river	Kaushalya Dam			Gravity			2012	Pinjore
Ghaggar Rivers	Ottu barrage						1896	Ottu, Sirsa district
Somb river	Pathrala barrage	34 m (112 ft)	460 m (1,510 ft)				1876	Yamunanagar district

== Himachal Pradesh ==
River	Dam	Height	Length	Type	Storage capacity	Reservoir area	Complete	Location
Satluj River	Bhakra Dam	226m (741 ft )	520m	Gravity	9.340 km^{3}	168.35 km^{2}	1963	Bilaspur
Satluj River	Koldam Dam							
Satluj River	Nathpa Dam							
Tons River	Kishau Dam							
Baspa River	Karcham Dam							
Baspa River	Sangla Dam							
Beas River	Pandoh Dam							
Beas River	Pong Dam							
Ravi River	Chamera Dam							

== Jammu and Kashmir ==
River	Dam	Height	Length	Type	Storage capacity	Reservoir area	Complete			
Chenab	Salal Dam									
Suru	Chutak Hydroelectric Plant									
Chenab	Dul Hasti Hydroelectric Plant									
Kishanganga	Kishanganga Hydroelectric Plant				7.55 MCM		Construction completed, commissioning awaited			
Indus	Nimoo Bazgo Hydroelectric Plant									
Chenab	Ratle Hydroelectric Plant				23.86 MCM		Under construction			
Jhelum River	Uri- II Dam Tulbul Project				6.34 MCM					
Chenab	Baglihar Dam				52 MCM					
Chenab	Salal Dam	Reasi district	Concrete-gravity & Rockfill	113 m	487 m	12	9.9	9.4	1987	Hydroelectric
Chenab	Baglihar Dam	Ramban district	Concrete Gravity	144.5 m	363 m	8	16.7	10.3	2008	Hydroelectric
Chenab	Dulhasti Dam	Kishtwar district	Concrete Gravity & Masonry	65 m	186 m	4	0.4	0.8	2007	Hydroelectric

.

== Jharkhand ==
River	Dam	Height	Length	Type	Storage capacity	Reservoir area	Complete
Swarnarekha	Getalsud Dam	35 m				717 km^{2}	
Swarnarekha	Chandil Dam	56.8 m	720.10 m	Earthen/ Gravity & Masonry	1963M cu m	56.46 km^{2}	1978
Swarnarekha	Dhurwa Dam						
Konar	Konar Dam	48.77 m	4,535 m			27.92 km^{2}	
Barakar	Maithon Dam	50 m	4,789 m			65 km^{2}	1957
Damodar	Panchet						
Damodar	Tenughat Dam						
Barakar	Tilaiya Dam						
Damodar	Khandoli Dam						
Mayurakshi	Massanjore Dam						
Ajay	Punasi Dam						

== Karnataka ==
Dam/Reservoir	River	Location	Storage capacity	Reservoir level	Height of dam	Length of dam	No. of gates	Type	Reservoir area	Year of completion	Purpose
Almatti Dam	Krishna	Basavana Bagevadi taluk, Bijapur district	123.25 tmcft	519.6 m	49.29 m	1564.85 m	26	Earth-fill, Gravity & Masonry dam	540.11 km^{2}	1999	Irrigation & Hydroelectric
Basava Sagara Dam	Krishna	Narayanapur, Shorapur Taluk, Yadgir district	37.965 tmcft	492.252 m	29.72 m	10637.52 m	30	Earth-fill, Gravity & Masonry dam	132.06 km^{2}	1982	Irrigation & Hydroelectric
Bhadra Dam	Bhadra	Lakkavalli, Tarikere taluk, Chikkamagaluru district	71.50 tmcft	186 ft	194 ft	1708 m	4	Earth-fill, Gravity & Masonry dam	112.508 km^{2}	1965	Irrigation & Hydroelectric
Tungabhadra Pull UP Dam	Tungabhadra	Hammigi, Gadag district	254.44 tmcft	511.50 m	NA m	402.00 m	27	Earth-fill, Gravity & Masonry dam	19850 (hectare) (Sq. km.)	2010	Irrigation & Hydroelectric
Tungabhadra Dam	Tungabhadra	Hospet, Bellary district	132.47 tmcft	497.74 m	49.39 m	2443 m	33	Earth-fill, Gravity & Masonry dam	378 km^{2}	1953	Irrigation & Hydroelectric
Krishna Raja Sagara Dam	Kaveri	Mandya	49.452 tmcft	124.80 ft	42.62 m	2621 m	152	Gravity & Masonry dam	107.808 km^{2}	1931	Irrigation & Hydroelectric
Linganamakki Dam	Sharavathi	Linganamakki, Sagara Taluk, Shimoga district	156.62 tmcft	554.43 m	61.26 m	2749.29 m	11	Earth-fill, Gravity & Masonry dam	317.28 km^{2}	1964	Hydroelectric
Harangi Reservoir	Harangi	Hudgur, Somawarapete taluk, Kodagu district	8.07 tmcft	871.42 m	53 m	845.8 m	4	Earth-fill, Gravity & Masonry dam	19.081 km^{2}	1982	Irrigation & Hydroelectric
Shanti Sagara	Haridra	Channagiri taluk, Davanagere district	3.5 tmcft	27 ft m	27 ft	290 m	2	Earth-fill	27 km^{2}	-	Irrigation
Raja Lakhamagowda dam	Ghataprabha	Hidkal, Hukkeri taluk, Belgaum district	51.16 tmcft	745.79 m	53.34 m	10183 m	10	Earth-fill, Gravity & Masonry dam	63.38 km^{2}	1977	Irrigation & Hydroelectric
Renuka Sagara Dam	Malaprabha	Navilutheertha, Saundatti taluk, Belgaum district	37.73 tmcft	633.83 m	43.13 m	154.52 m	4	Gravity & Masonry dam	54.97 km^{2}	1972	Irrigation & Hydroelectric
Kadra Dam	Kali	Karwar, Uttara Kannada district	13.74 tmcft	34.50 m	40.50 m	2313 m	8	Earth-fill, Gravity & Masonry dam	32.48 km^{2}	1997	Hydroelectric
Supa Dam	Kali	Joida, Uttara Kannada district	147.54 tmcft	564 m	101 m	331.29 m	3	Gravity & Masonry dam	124 km^{2}	1987	Hydroelectric
Kanva Reservoir	Kanva	Channapatna, Ramanagara district	0.85 tmcft	-	22.57 m	1422 m	-	Earth-fill	4.37 km^{2}	1946	Irrigation
Kodasalli Dam	Kali	Joida, Uttara Kannada district	10.14 tmcft	75.5 m	52.1 m	534 m	9	Earth-fill, Gravity & Masonry dam	20.85 km^{2}	2000	Hydroelectric
Vani Vilasa Sagara	Vedavathi	Marikanive, Hiriyur Taluk, Chitradurga district	28.34 tmcft	652.28 m	43.28 m	405.4 m	2	Earth-fill, Gravity & Masonry dam	87.63 km^{2}	1907	Irrigation & Hydroelectric

== Kerala ==
Dams in Kerala

There are 44 rivers in Kerala, and 42 dams and reservoirs. The dams and reservoirs in Kerala include Solaiyar Dam, Kakkayam Dam, Idamalayar Dam, Peringalkuthu Dam and Kakki Reservoir.

District Wise
District	Number of Dams
Ernakulam	2
Idukki	12
Kannur	1
Kollam	1
Kozhikode	2
Palakkad	11
Pathanamthitta	4
Thiruvananthapuram	3
Thrissur	4
Wayanad	2
Total	42

Serial number	River	Name	Area (km^{2})	District	Co-ordinate	Altitude (m)
1.	Bharathapuzha River	Malampuzha Dam	23.13	Palakkad	10.84°N 76.69°E	104
2.	Bharathapuzha River	Mangalam Dam	3.93	Palakkad	10.51°N 76.54°E	72
3.	Bharathapuzha River	Meenkara Dam	2.59	Palakkad	10.62°N 76.80°E	152
4.	Bharathapuzha River	Chulliar Dam	1.59	Palakkad	10.59°N 76.77°E	143
5.	Bharathapuzha River	Pothundi Dam	3.63	Palakkad	10.54°N 76.63°E	93
6.	Bharathapuzha River	Walayar Dam	2.59	Palakkad	10.84°N 76.86°E	197
7.	Siruvani River	Siruvani Dam		Palakkad		
8.	Bharathapuzha River	Kanjirapuzha Dam	5.12	Palakkad	10.98°N 76.55°E	90
9.	Chalakkudy River	Parambikulam	20.92	Palakkad	10.39°N 76.8°E	545
10.	Chalakkudy River	Thunakkadavu Dam	2.83	Palakkad	10.433°N 76.784°E	565
11.	Chalakkudy River	Peruvaaripallam Dam		Palakkad	10.447°N 76.77°E	565
12.	Chalakkudy River	Sholayar Dam	8.70	Thrissur	10° 17' 76° 45'	
13.	Chalakkudy River	Peringalkuthu Dam	2.63	Thrissur		
14.	Kallada River	Thenmala Dam	25.90	Kollam	09° 57' 77° 4'20"	
15.	Karamana River	Aruvikkara Dam	2.58	Thiruvananthapuram	08° 28' 77° 58'	
16.	Karuvanoor River	Peechi Dam	12.63	Thrissur	10.53°N 76.39°E	73
17.	Keecheri River	Vazhani Dam	2.55	Thrissur	10° 40' 76° 15'	
18.	Kuttiady River	Kuttiady Dam	10.52	Kozhikode	11° 36' 75° 49'27"	
19.	Neyyar River	Neyyar Dam	15.00	Thiruvananthapuram	08° 32' 77° 08'	
20.	Pamba River	Pamba Dam	5.70	Pathanamthitta	09° 20' 76° 53'	
21.	Pamba River	Kakki	18.00	Pathanamthitta	9°17′N 77°15′E	981m
22.	Periyar River	Idukki Dam	61.60	Idukki	09° 48' 76° 53'	720
23.	Periyar River	Ponmudi Dam	2.60	Idukki	09° 55' 77° 05'	
24.	Periyar River	Anayirankal Dam	4.33	Idukki	10° 0' 77° 0'	
25.	Periyar River	Kundala Dam	2.30	Idukki	10° 0' 77° 0'	
26.	Periyar River	Mattupatti Dam	3.24	Idukki	10° 05' 77° 05'	
27.	Periyar River	Sengulam Dam	0.33	Idukki	10° 00' 77° 05'	
28.	Periyar River	Neriamangalam Dam	4.13	Ernakulam		
29.	Periyar River	Bhoothathankettu Dam	6.08	Ernakulam		
30.	Periyar River	Periyar Lake	28.90	Idukki	10° 10' 76° 15'	
31.	Valapattanam River	Pazhassi Dam	6.48	Kannur		
32.	Karamana River	Peppara Dam	5.82	Thiruvananthapuram		
33.	Thodupuzha River	Malankara Dam	11.00	Idukki		
34.	Kurumali River	Chimmony Dam	85.067	Thrissur	10.4391°N 76.4604°E	
35.	Kabini River	Banasura Sagar Dam		Wayanad		
36.	Karapuzha River	Karapuzha Dam		Wayanad		
37.	Periyar River	Mullaperiyar Dam		Idukki		
38.	Periyar River	Cheruthoni Dam		Idukki		
39.	Periyar River	Kulamavu Dam		Idukki		
40.	Erattayar Lake	Erattayar Dam		Idukki		
41.	Kuttiyadi River	Kakkayam Dam	7.15	Kozhikode		
42.	Chelakkara River	Asurankund Dam	7.15	Thrissur	10.6855° N, 76.2955° E	

== Madhya Pradesh ==
River	Dam	Height	Length	Type	Storage capacity	Reservoir area	Complete
Son River	Bansagar Dam	49 m	3600 m		1,024,000 m^{3}		
Narmada River	Bargi Dam	64 m	750 m		50,000,000 m^{3}		
Narmada River	Maheshwar Hydro Power Dam					Under Construction	
Indirasagar	92 m	653 m		9,750,000,000 m^{3}			
Narmada river	Omkareshwar Dam	33 m	949 m	gravity			
Barna River	Barna Dam						
Kaliasote river	Bhadbhada Dam						
Wainganga	Bheemgarh Dam						
Kutni river	kutni Dam, Khajwa						
Kutni river	kutni dam, Madhya Pradesh	25m					
Chambal	Gandhi Sagar Dam						
Halali River	Halali Dam						
Kolar River	Kolar Dam						
Betwa	Rajghat Dam						
Tawa	Tawa Reservoir						
Sank	Tigra Dam						
	Kerwa Dam						
Sindh River	Madikheda Dam						
Parvati River	Harshi Dam						
Pench River	Machagora Dam						
Newaj River	mohanpura Dam						

== Manipur ==
River	Dam	Height	Length	Type	Storage capacity	Reservoir area	Complete
Khuga River	Khuga dam	38 m	230 m	earth-fill embankment dam	86.08 million cubic meters	321 Sq Km	2010
Barak River	Tipaimukh Dam	168.8 m	390 m	concrete gravity and rock-fill dam	15,900 million cubic meters	300+ Sq Km	Not started

== Maharashtra ==
Name of dam	Year completed	River	Location	Type	Height (m)	Length (m)	Volume content (10^{3}m^{3})	Gross storage capacity (10^{3}m^{3})	Reservoir area (10^{3}m^{2})	Effective storage capacity (10^{3}m^{3})	Purpose	Designed spillway capacity (m^{3}/s)
Dhamapur	1530	Malvan	Sindhudurg	Earthfill	11	217	2687				Irrigation	9.85
Powai	1799	Mithi	Mumbai	Earthfill	12						Water Supply	
Vihar	1860	Vihar	Mumbai	Earthfill	25.6	817	353	41459.00	7270	41410.00	Water Supply	
Ekrukh	1871	Adela	Solapur	Earthfill	21.4500	2360	130	61170.00		61170.00	Irrigation; Water Supply	1239
Shirsufal	1879	local	Pune, Baramati	Earthfill	20.11	741		10100.00	1601	9520.00	Irrigation	112
Tulshi	1879	Tulshi	Mumbai	Earthfill; Gravity	26	186		10429.00	1350	10273.00	Water supply	640
Khadakwasla	1880	Mutha	Pune, Khadakwasala	Earthfill; Gravity	32.9	1539	1170	86000.00	14800	56000.00	Irrigation; Water supply	2755
Ashti	1883	Ashti	Solapur, Mohol	Earthfill	17.6	3871		40000.00		23000.00	Irrigation	1359
Mhaswad	1887	Man	Satara, Man	Earthfill	24	2473		47880.00	16251	46210.00	Irrigation	4321.41
Tansa	1892	Tansa	Mumbai	Earthfill; Gravity	41	2804	2670	208700.00	19.1	184600.00	Water supply	1188.6
Shetfal	1901	Shetfal Nalla	Pune, Indapur	Earthfill	20.11	3211	173	17360.00	3498	1693.00	Irrigation	
Khairbandha	1903	Fattepur	Gondia	Earthfill	18.16	2205	243.52	16798.00	4147	15953.00	Irrigation	363.3
Pathari	1905	local	Solapur, Barshi	Earthfill	18.43	2070		11880.00		11620.00	Irrigation	512
Chankapur	1911	Girna	Kalwan	Earthfill	41	3705	2123	79690.00	10320	76850.00	Irrigation	2237
Ramtek	1913	Sur	Ramtek	Earthfill	22.2	229	1300	105130.00	21270	103000.00	Irrigation	515
Chandpur	1915	Chandpur	Tumsar	Earthfill	19	1051	80.36	29025.00	9072	28879.00	Irrigation	339.25
Walwan	1916	Indrayani	Pune, Lonavala	Gravity	26.36	1356	182	72500.00	14250	72122.00	Hydroelectricity	171
Darna	1916	Darna	Nashik, Igatpuri	Gravity	28	1634	1886.1	226870.00	34750	209820.00	Irrigation	3336
Bodalkasa	1917	Bhagdeogoti	Tiroda	Earthfill	19.2	510	107.62	17392.00	6450	16454.00	Irrigation	206.63
Asolamendha	1918	local	Shindewadi	Earthfill	18.08	1376.52	350	67015.00	1880	56375.00	Irrigation	758
Shirvata	1920	Indrayani	Pune, Lonavala	Gravity	38.71	2212	460	185980.00	13.08	185110.00	Hydroelectricity	593
Thokarwadi	1922	Indrayani	Pune, Maval	Gravity	59.44	741	212	363700.00	24.3	321200.00	Hydroelectricity	546
Chorkhamara	1923	Sasanda	Tiroda	Earthfill	21.05	1178	300	21051.00	5235	20800.00	Irrigation	264.94
Ghorazari	1923	Gorazari	Nagbhir	Earthfill	23.55	731.7	90	45080.00	976	38000.00	Irrigation	320
Bhandardara	1926	Paravara	Ahmednagar	Gravity	82.35	2717	335	312400.00	743.18	307310.00	Irrigation	1503
Bhatghar	1927	Velvandi	Pune, Bhor	Gravity	57.92	1625	650	670650.00	31900	666000.00	Irrigation; Hydroelectricity	1599
Mulshi	1927	Mula	Pune, Mulashi	Gravity	48.8	1533.38		52230.00	3802		Hydroelectricity	1892
Mas	1932	Mas	Khamgaon	Earthfill	17.71	663	399	17500.00	4810	15040.00	Irrigation	1753
Ghanewadi	1935	Kundlika	Jalna	Earthfill	15	836		14440.00			Water Supply	
Visapur	1936	Hanga	Srigonda	Earthfill	26	2692	130	33320.00		33320.00	Irrigation	2627
Radhanagari	1954	Bhogawati	Radhanagari	Gravity	42.68	1143		236810.00	18218	220000.00	Irrigation; Hydroelectricity	1133
Vaitarna (Modaksagar)	1954	Vaitarna	Mumbai	Gravity	82	567.07	0.06	204980.00	8.39	174790.00	Water supply	5660
Purmepeda	1955	Bori	Dhule	Earthfill	24.7	1500	525	13550.00	303	12960.00	Irrigation	2141
Khasapur	1956	local	Paranda	Earthfill	23.78	1882		19830.00	430	15830.00	Irrigation	2863
Dheku	1960	Dheku	Vaijapur	Earthfill	20	2421	137	14000.00	447	12160.00	Irrigation	1945
Sindphana	1963	Sindphana	Patoda	Earthfill	19.05	1937	12593	12600.00	5068	10810.00	Irrigation	1857
Ekburji	1964	Chandrabhaga	Washim	Earthfill	23.7	830	566	14100.00	218	11960.00	Irrigation	1001
Khelocala	1964	Khelocala	Sillod	Earthfill	21	759	588	13000.00	3678	11070.00	Irrigation	1518
Upper Dudhana	1964	Dudhana	Jalna	Earthfill	18	2750	965	15000.00	445	13010.00	Irrigation	1912
Koyna	1964	Koyna	Patan	Gravity	103	805	1555	2797400.00	11535	2640000.00	Hydroelectricity	3883
Harni	1965	local	Osmanabad, Tuljapur	Earthfill	16.55	3059		13580.00	317	11180.00	Irrigation	1647
Gangapur	1965	Godavari	Nashik	Earthfill	36.59	3902	4612	215880.00	22860	203880.00	Irrigation	2293
Chandani	1965	Chandani	Osmanabad, Paranda	Earthfill	17.18	1920	289	20700.00	813	15220.00	Irrigation	3030
Bor	1965	Bor	Bori	Earthfill	36.28	1158	2474	138750.00	13506	127420.00	Irrigation	3058
Ghod	1965	Ghod	Shirur	Earthfill	29.6	3300	1020	216300.00	30992	154800.00	Irrigation	7419
Tisangi	1966	local	Solapur, Pandharpur	Earthfill	20.82	2866		24460.00		22760.00	Irrigation	410
Wunna	1966	Wunna	Nagpur	Earthfill	18.18	2525	390	23560.00	569	21640.00	Irrigation	1326.64
Galhati	1966	Galhati	Ambad	Earthfill	13.1	2987		13840.00			Irrigation	2152
Mangi	1966	Kanola	Solapur, Karmala	Earthfill	22.95	1475		32720.00		32720.00	Irrigation	2232
Mehakari	1966	Mehakari	Ashti	Earthfill	27.63	1308	163.5	16130.00	38	13000.00	Irrigation	2233
Wan	1966	Wan	Beed, Ambejogai	Earthfill	19	2798	1358	25180.00		2190.00	Irrigation	2340
Bhudihal	1966	Belwan	Solapur, Sangola	Earthfill	18.5	2975		32050.00		27950.00	Irrigation	2350
Nawegaonbandh	1967	local	Navegaon	Earthfill	11.58	625		45943.00	10344	29590.00	Irrigation	124.2
Pandherbodi	1967	local	Umrer	Earthfill	15.24	1769	284	13860.00	425	13120.00	Irrigation	432
Kurje (Dhapcheri)	1967	local	Dahanu	Earthfill	22.96	2507.76	846.12	39050.00	5620	38085.00	Irrigation; Water Supply	598
Nalganga	1967	Nalganga	Malkapur	Earthfill	29.8	2516	1500	71860.00	10980	70540.00	Irrigation	2158
Sukhana	1968	Sukhana	Aurangabad	Earthfill	16.92	446	68	21340.00	6782	18480.00	Irrigation	2101
Kurnur	1968	Bori	Osmanabad, Tuljapur	Earthfill	23.7	1206	45	35240.00	570	32670.00	Irrigation	2190
Manar	1968	Manar	Kandhar	Earthfill	27	2592	1557	139000.00	2559	128700.00	Irrigation	8778
Yeldari	1968	Purna	Yeldari	Earthfill	51.2	4232		934310.00	101540	809660.00	Irrigation; Hydroelectricity	10477
Siddheshwar	1968	Purna	Siddeshwar	Earthfill	38.26	6353.2	907.2	250850.00	40580	80940.00	Irrigation	10789
Kundrala	1969	local	Mukhed	Earthfill	18.5	999	370	14680.00	253	12990.00	Irrigation	811
Gharni	1969	Gharni	Sirur	Earthfill	15.24	956		25080.00		22460.00	Irrigation	1882
Dolwahal (Weir)	1969	Kundlika	Roha	Earthfill	12.5	543	1943	10070.00	3230	1840.00	Irrigation; Water Supply	3030
Girna	1969	Girna	Nandgaon	Earthfill	54.56	963.17	2042	608980.00	60040	525920.00	Irrigation; Hydroelectricity	8433
Malangaon	1970	Kan	Sakri	Earthfill	23.78	1141	500	13023.00	248	11325.00	Irrigation	1075
Karwand	1970	Arunanadi	Sirpur	Earthfill	39.3	2966	1191	33840.00		31500.00	Irrigation	2461
Itiadoh	1970	Garvi	Arjuni	Earthfill; Gravity	29.85	505	911	288830.00	46910	225120.00	Irrigation; Hydroelectricity	3230
Sirpur	1970	Bagh	Deori	Earthfill; Gravity	24.69	2840	1195	203840.00	32970	192520.00	Irrigation	3633
Pujaritola	1970	Bagh	Amgaon	Earthfill; Gravity	19.2	2661	664	65110.00	17650	48690.00	Irrigation	4246.88
Terna	1970	Terna	Osmanabad	Earthfill	15	2651	186	22910.00	380	18630.00	Irrigation	
Morna	1971	local	Patur	Earthfill	28.65	600	1109	44740.00	4930	41460.00	Irrigation	1631
Gyanganga	1971	Gyanganga	Khamgaon	Earthfill	35.73	639	1380	36270.00	4151	33930.00	Irrigation	1742
Upper Pus (Pus)	1971	Pus	Yavatmal, Pusad	Earthfill	42	744	1980	113920.00	8953	91260.00	Irrigation	4007
Malkhed	1972	Kholad	Chandur Rly	Earthfill	17.05	1422	481	10900.00	6717	8960.00	Irrigation; Water Supply	1108
Tanajisagar (Panshet)	1972	Ambi	Velhe	Earthfill; Gravity	63.56	1039	4190	303000.00	15645	294000.00	Irrigation; Water supply	1162.4
Pawana	1972	Pawana	Pune, Pawananagar	Earthfill; Gravity	42.37	1329	1989	30500.00	2365	241000.00	Hydroelectricity; Water supply	1250
Kalyangirija	1972	Kalyangirija	Jalna	Earthfill	22.07	1183	520	10160.00	568	8469.00	Irrigation	1310
Bhojapur	1972	Mahalungi	Nashik, Sinnar	Earthfill	32.41	733	449	13730.00	3352	10700.00	Irrigation	1488
Saikheda	1972	Khuni	Pandharkawada	Earthfill	23.77	1740	909	38511.00	836	27184.00	Irrigation	2671
Mula	1972	Mula	Ahmadnagar, Rahuri	Earthfill; Gravity	48.17	2856	7594	736320.00	53600	608890.00	Irrigation	5947
Upper Vaitarana	1973	Vaitarna	Nashik, Igatpuri	Earthfill; Gravity	41	2531	1520	331630.00	37130	331000.00	Irrigation	1440
Panzara	1973	Panzara	Sakri	Earthfill	33.5	1430	1597	43500.00	5590	35800.00	Irrigation	1768
Yeralwadi	1973	Yerala	Satara, Khatav	Earthfill	19.5	2115	663	33020.00		18060.00	Irrigation	2083
Manyad	1973	Manyad	Chalisgaon	Earthfill	45	1677	896.5	53980.00	8710	40257.00	Irrigation	3755
Chulbandh	1974	Chulbandh	Gondia	Earthfill	22.08	465	130	21458.00	3750	16540.00	Irrigation	846.11
Dhamna	1974	local	Bhokardan	Earthfill	13	2560	443	10730.00	433	8490.00	Irrigation	1414
Dina	1974	Dina	Charmoshi	Earthfill	21.49	3137	957	61150.00	13765	55940.00	Irrigation	1671
Kanoli	1974	Bori	Dhule	Earthfill	24.5	459	290	11900.00	217	8450.00	Irrigation	1840
Nazare	1974	Karha	Pune, Purandar	Earthfill	22.54	2021	1010	22316.00	3890	16650.00	Irrigation; Water Supply	2425
Karanjwan	1974	Kadwa	Dindori	Earthfill	39.31	2483	1960	175580.00	18420	166220.00	Irrigation	2724
Katepurna	1974	Katepurna	Mahan Barshi Takali	Earthfill	29.5	2000	693	97670.00	12430	86350.00	Irrigation; Water Supply	2783
Kolkewadi	1975	Local Nallah	Chiplun	Gravity	64	497	576	36220.00	167	11220.00	Hydroelectricity	1081
Nirguna	1975	Nirguna	Patur	Earthfill	25.7	1800	124	32290.00	4760	28840.00	Irrigation	1678
Karpara	1975	Karpara	Jintur	Earthfill	16.66	1046	344	27320.00	778	24700.00	Irrigation	2033
Palkhed	1975	Kadva	Nashik, Dindori	Earthfill	34.75	4110	1228	230100.00	5760	212400.00	Irrigation	4592
Kanholibara	1976	Krishna	Hingana	Earthfill	21.05	1365	115.3	22213.00	333	19820.00	Irrigation	1141
Vir Baji Pasalkar(Varasgaon)	1976	Mosi	Pune, Velhe	Earthfill; Gravity	63.4	785	10550	374000.00	24200	275000.00	Irrigation; Hydroelectricity	1416
Alwandi	1976	Vaitarna	Nashik, Igatpuri	Earthfill	37.8	2548	930	353750.00	37130	331110.00	Irrigation	1420
Adhala	1976	Adhala	Akola	Earthfill	40	623	1437	30000.00	2306	27600.00	Irrigation	1582
Tiru	1976	Tiru	Osmanabad	Earthfill	21	1851	311	23320.00	690	15401.00	Irrigation	1985
Kamthikhairy (Pench)	1976	Pench	Nagpur	Earthfill	32	1876	4928	230000.00	23653	180000.00	Irrigation; Water Supply	12000
Jayakwadi	1976	Godavari	Aurangabad, Paithan	Earthfill	41.3	10415	13410	2909000.00	39800	2170000.00	Irrigation; Hydroelectricity	18153
Jakapur	1977	local	Latur	Earthfill	14.8	2257	322	10176.00			Irrigation	1305
Pargaon Ghatshil	1977	Kinha	Pargaon Ghatshil	Earthfill	22.46	911.65	297	12450.00	3740		Irrigation	1467
Dhom	1977	Krishna	Wai	Earthfill; Gravity	50	2478	6335	382270.00	2498	331100.00	Irrigation; Hydroelectricity	1778.29
Suki	1977	Suki	Khiroda	Earthfill	42	716	1430	50170.00	366	39860.00	Irrigation	2336
Hingani (Pangaon)	1977	Bhogawati	Solapur, Barshi	Earthfill	21.87	2193	74	45510.00		31970.00	Irrigation	2435
Yedgaon	1977	Kukadi	Pune, Junnar	Earthfill; Gravity	29.74	4511	1004	93430.00	1700	79270.00	Irrigation	3844
Bori	1977	Bori	Parola	Earthfill	20	3365	5534	40960.00	8460	25020.00	Irrigation	4206
Adan	1977	Aran	Karanja	Earthfill; Rockfill	30.13	755	1428	78320.00	10520	67250.00	Irrigation	4623
Januna	1978	local	Barshi Takali	Earthfill	11.95	390	150	11310.00	404	1180.00	Irrigation	260
Makardhokada	1978	Amb	Umrer	Earthfill	18.81	1645	652.87	21356.00	322	19931.00	Irrigation	450
Matoba	1978	Bhima	Pune, Daund	Earthfill	17.5	1662	45.6	45200.00	1900	37100.00	Irrigation	476
Tulshi	1978	Tulshi	Radhanagari	Earthfill; Gravity	48.68	1512	25	98290.00	533	89910.00	Irrigation; Hydroelectricity	640
Khandeshar	1978	Vali	Osmanabad	Earthfill	17.14	1257	305	10840.00	3000	8820.00	Irrigation	800
Karadkhed	1978	local	Degloor	Earthfill	19	1454	498	12000.00	289	10980.00	Irrigation	1148
Ambadi	1978	Sivana	Aurangabad, Kannad	Earthfill	20	2210	707	12000.00		9420.00	Irrigation	1412
Barvi	1978	Kalyanthane	Thane	Earthfill	48.78	746		178580.00	0.04	176940.00	Water Supply	1585
Waghadi	1978	Waghadi	Ghatanji	Earthfill; Gravity	26	960	773	41110.00	6580	35360.00	Irrigation	1815
Aner	1978	Aner	Shivpur	Earthfill	47	2275	3162	103270.00		58914.00	Irrigation	4318
Waghad	1979	Kalwan	Nashik, Dindori	Earthfill	45.6	952	1783	76480.00	526	70000.00	Irrigation	1610
Koradi	1979	Koradi	Buldhana, Mehkar	Earthfill	19.31	900	1193	22500.00	6465	15120.00	Irrigation	2446
Kawadas (Pickup)	1979	local	Thane, Javhar	Earthfill	28.08	630	180	13700.00	5480	9970.00	Irrigation	3700
Mandohol	1979	Mandohol	Parner	Earthfill	27.07	739	426	11300.00	199.51	8780.00	Irrigation	11420
Pethwadaj	1980	local	Kandhar	Earthfill	19.5	1260	495	11600.00	2970	9040.00	Irrigation	1185
Haranbari	1980	Mosam	Satana	Earthfill	34	1419	2375	34780.00	5540	33020.00	Irrigation	1312
Kelzar	1981	Aram	Satana	Earthfill	32.5	1236	1622	17100.00	1660	16210.00	Irrigation	832.4
Uma	1981	Uma	Murtijapur	Earthfill	20.42	2140	434	14010.00	2600	11690.00	Irrigation	1340
Sonal	1981	Aran	M Pir	Earthfill	19.6	1114	698	20270.00		16920.00	Irrigation	1368
Masoli	1981	Masoli	Gangakhed	Earthfill	24.84	1086	626	34080.00	6970	27390.00	Irrigation	2028
Goki	1981	Goki	Darwha	Earthfill; Gravity	23.06	1572	658	50220.00	11360	42710.00	Irrigation; Water supply	2066
Yelavi	1982	local	Sangli, Jath	Earthfill	15.25	764	111	22260.00		2180.00	Irrigation	557
Rangawali	1982	Rangawali	Dhule	Earthfill	25.63	1878	1289	15020.00	329	12890.00	Irrigation	1168
Ozarkhed	1982	Unanda	Nashik, Dindori	Earthfill	35.3	3266	2052	67950.00	6880	60320.00	Irrigation	1610
Tawarja	1982	Tawarja	Latur	Earthfill	14.3	2222	361	20520.00	741	16950.00	Irrigation	1903
Tillari (Proj.)	1982	Tillari	Sawantwadi	Earthfill; Gravity	73	943	9274	462170.00	16250	447290.00	Irrigation; Water supply	2465
Manjara	1952	Manjara	Beed, Kalamb	Earthfill	25	4203	2213	250700.00		173320.00	Irrigation	6000
Isapur	1982	Penganga	Nanded	Earthfill	57	4120.1	11216	1254000.00		951000.00	Irrigation	10480
Hatnur	1982	Tapi	Jalgaon, Bhusawal	Earthfill	25.5	2580	3850	388000.00	48160	255000.00	Irrigation	26415
Chandai	1983	Chandai Nalla	Varora	Earthfill	11.91	1830	181	13200.00	523	10690.00	Irrigation	842.85
Alandi	1983	Alandi	Nashik	Earthfill	29.3	1690	2782	29600.00	55900	27820.00	Irrigation	1002
Borna	1983	Borna	Beed, Ambejogai	Earthfill	22.3	866	460	10908.00	2191	9060.00	Irrigation	1249
Wadaj	1983	Meena	Pune, Junnar	Earthfill; Gravity	30.7	1875	1009	36000.00	467	33200.00	Irrigation	1426
Chargaon	1983	Chargaon	Varora	Earthfill	14.4	3065	428	21700.00	12921.9	19866.00	Irrigation	1450.5
Pothara	1983	Pothara	Hinganghat	Earthfill	14.21	2220	318	38400.00	13900	34720.00	Irrigation	1732
Burai	1983	Burai	Sakri	Earthfill	30.6	1013	168	21330.00	31440	14210.00	Irrigation	2149
Erai	1983	Erai	Chandrapur	Earthfill; Gravity	30	1620	985	226500.00	58000	193000.00	Water supply	2610
Bhatsa	1983	Bhatsa	Thane, Shahapur	Earthfill; Gravity	88.5	959	18250	976150.00	2725	942115.00	Irrigation; Water supply	5342
Lower Pus	1983	Pus	Mahagaon	Earthfill	28	3346	6167	81160.00	15890	59630.00	Irrigation	5437
Natuwadi	1984	Tr.of Charti	Khed	Earthfill	45.25	900	22.3	28080.00	2000	27230.00	Irrigation	690.73
Manikdoh	1984	Kukadi	Pune, Junnar	Gravity	51.8	930	596	308060.00	18434	283070.00	Irrigation; Hydroelectricity	1439
Kolar	1984	Kolar	Saoner	Earthfill	30.11	2910	1084	35380.00	6430	31320.00	Irrigation	1598.2
Kordi	1985	Kordi	Navapur	Earthfill	27.75	1952	923	11690.00	1677	10300.00	Irrigation	735
Amalocalalla	1985	Amalocalalla	Rajura	Earthfill	37.75	1607	133.4	22700.00	3703	21200.00	Irrigation	1067
Morna (Shirala)	1985	Morna	Shirala	Earthfill	31.2	1115	793	21160.00	3203	15150.00	Irrigation	1075
Tillari (Main)	1986	Tillari	Chandgad	Gravity	38.05	485	250	113266.00	9290	92020.00	Hydroelectricity	1028
Kalyan	1986	Kalyan	Jalna	Earthfill	16.49	1554	492	15360.00	533	10360.00	Irrigation	1315
Girija	1986	Girija	Aurangabad, Khultabad	Earthfill	19.1	3060	70	24500.00	775	21230.00	Irrigation	1649
Ujani	1980	Bhima	Solapur, Tembhurni	Earthfill	56.4	2534		3140000.00	337000.00	1517000.00	Irrigation	15717
Kundlika	1986	Kundlika	Beed, Majalgaon	Earthfill	28.45	1403		46350.00	6850		Irrigation	2751
Kanher	1986	Wenna	Satara	Earthfill; Gravity	50.34	1954	6308	286000.00	18.63	271680.00	Irrigation; Hydroelectricity	3203
Sina	1986	Sina	Ahmadnagar, Karjat	Earthfill	28.5	1580	681.5	67950.00	12834		Irrigation	4450
Dham	1986	Dham	Arvi	Earthfill	33.35	1728	2737	72460.00	7780	62510.00	Irrigation	5416.6
Wandri	1987	Wandri	Thane, Palghar	Earthfill	29.6	1336	1206	36510.00	4438	34710.00	Irrigation	567
Raigavan	1987	local	Beed, Kalam	Earthfill	19.74	2090		12703.00	4920	11259.00	Irrigation	1411
Dhamni (Surya)	1987	Surya	Dhamni, Palghar	Earthfill	59	1563	1270	285310.00	16130	273350.00	Irrigation; Hydroelectricity	2696
Majalgaon	1987	Sindphana	Beed, Majalgaon	Earthfill	31.19	6488	5759	453640.00	78130	311300.00	Irrigation; Hydroelectricity	14500
Khekaranalla	1988	KhekaraNalla	Kalmeshwar	Earthfill	24.5	330	306	26325.00	5566	23810.00	Irrigation	1343
Kalisarar	1988	Kalisarar	Salekasa	Earthfill; Gravity	25.52	830	697	30460.00	6500	27750.00	Irrigation	1402
Khairi	1989	Kar	Ahmadnagar, Jamkhed	Earthfill	18.91	1210	54	15110.00	492	13743.00	Irrigation	1962
Totladoh	1989	Pench	Ramtek	Gravity	74.5	680	972	1241109.00	77710	1091000.00	Hydroelectricity	12072
Adol	1990	Adola	Borala	Earthfill	18.47	1725	479	15270.00	3141		Irrigation	1274
Shahanoor	1990	Shahanoor	AnjangaonSurji	Earthfill	57.81	828	3446	47850.00	2970	46040.00	Irrigation; Water Supply	2406
Lower Wunna (Nand)	1990	Nand	Nagpur	Earthfill; Gravity	16.25	2513	1833	62182.00	21642	53182.00	Irrigation	5238
Nagyasakya	1992	Panzan	Nandgaon	Earthfill	23.09	1440	292	15620.00	4050	11240.00	Irrigation	51.55
Sakol	1992	local	Latur, Udgir	Earthfill	17.65	1425	371	12689.00	4256	10950.00	Irrigation	1178
Borgaon	1993	local	Yavatmal	Earthfill	20	830	1404	14040.00	288	12224.00	Irrigation	686
Pakadiguddam	1993	Deogad	Chandrapur	Earthfill	19	1814	1067	13307.00	2579	11800.00	Irrigation	803
Devargan	1993	Devari	Latur, Udgir	Earthfill	15.58	1715		13410.00	4010	10670.00	Irrigation	1136
Upper Wardha	1993	Wardha	Amrawati	Earthfill; Gravity	46.2	5920	6500	786480.00	93122	614800.00	Irrigation; Hydroelectricity; Water supply	19457
Bokani	1994	local	Latur, Udgir	Earthfill	17.03	1440		13460.00	3170	8590.00	Irrigation	1258.8
Benitura	1994	local	Latur, Omerga	Earthfill	13.48	1780		12810.00			Irrigation	1614
Sakat	1994	Dudhana	Osmanabad, Paranda	Earthfill	19.8	2775		14430.00	4340	13440.00	Irrigation	1686
Tembhapuri	1994	Nagzari	Aurangabad	Earthfill	16.42	5300	809	21260.00	8495	19000.00	Irrigation	2038
Arunawati	1994	Arunawati	Yavatmal, Digras	Earthfill; Gravity	29.5	5170	4412	198395.00	39290	169675.00	Irrigation	8525
Sankh	1995	Local	Jath, Sangli	Earthfill	17.66	3282	743				Irrigation	3226
Waldevi	1995	Waldevi	Nashik	Earthfill	36.4	1890	1304	33720.00	3437	32050.00	Irrigation	809
Tisgaon	1995	Parashri	Nashik, Dindori	Earthfill	24.9	1674	1080	15140.00	292	12440.00	Irrigation	1744
Mukane	1995	Aaundha	Nawapur	Earthfill	26.93	1530	2271	214160.00	3018	203970.00	Irrigation	1938
Masalga	1996	local	Latur, Nilanga	Earthfill	10.26	2023		14670.00	3696		Irrigation	996
Vishwamitri	1996	Vishwamitri	Patur	Earthfill	21.06	1275	565	10116.00	1766		Irrigation	1332
Jam	1996	Jam	Katol	Earthfill	24	3460	107	28050.00	7565	23550.00	Irrigation	1564
Kadwa	1997	Kadwa	Nashik, Igatpuri	Earthfill	31.84	1660	1245	59590.00	6705	52910.00	Irrigation	2821
Bahula	1997	Bahula	Tumsar	Earthfill	17	5280	847	20030.00	581	16330.00	Irrigation	3802
Lower Wunna (Wadgaon)	1997	Wadgaon	Nagpur	Earthfill; Gravity	23.65	5330	2998	152600.00	36138	136000.00	Irrigation	10877
Bholavali	1998	Mandangad	Ratnagiri	Earthfill; Gravity							Irrigation	
Kashypi	1998	Kashyapi	Rajapur	Earthfill	41.75	1291	2761	52690.00	2867	52430.00	Irrigation	799
Purnaneopur	1998	Purna	Aurangabad, Kannad	Earthfill	16.6	2725	506	11380.00	3848	9340.00	Irrigation	1184
Punegaon	1998	Unanda	Sangli, Tasgaon	Earthfill	24.14	1803	991	20399.00	3646	17750.00	Irrigation	1332
Sonwad	1998	Sonwad	Sindkheda	Earthfill	18.58	4699	614	12690.00	3434	9530.00	Irrigation	1349
Narangi	1998	local	Vaijapur	Earthfill	16.5			13290.00			Irrigation	2296
Bor Dahegaon	1998	local	Vaijapur	Earthfill	16.7			13400.00			Irrigation	2510
Mun	1998	Mun	Buldhana, Khamgaon	Earthfill	30.2	1466	1362	42480.00	4527	36830.00	Irrigation	3623
Awashi	1999	local	Ratnagiri, Dapoli	Earthfill	36.51	350	894	11151.00	831	10440.00	Irrigation	221.18
Vadiwale	1999	Kundali	Pune, Lonavala	Earthfill	29	485.64	8.73	40870.00	3558	30390.00	Irrigation	746.82
Anjanapalshi	1999	Anjana	Aurangabad, Kannad	Earthfill	19.4	1952	937	15550.00	3887	13740.00	Irrigation	1167
Pimpalgaon Joge	1999	AR	Pune, Junnar	Earthfill	28.6	1560	2010	235520.00	263000	110240.00	Irrigation	1943.7
Savatri	1999	Savatri	Ratnagiri, Poladpur	Gravity	33.62	320	196	29450.00	2700	26360.00	Water supply	3919.79
Dudhaganga	1999	Dudhaganga	Kolhapur, Radhanagri	Gravity	73.08	1280	1605	719120.00	679110	25360.00	Water supply	1940
Temghar	2000	Mutha	Pune, Lavarde	Earthfill; Gravity	42.5	1075	1188	107900.00	55512	101010.00	Irrigation	626.5
Dongargaon	2000	local	Rajura	Earthfill	23	572	285	14180.00	3757	12440.00	Irrigation	840
Hetwane	2000	Bhogeshwari	Raigadh, Pen	Earthfill	48.2	675	144980	147490.00	6740	137625.00	Irrigation; Water Supply	1084
Gunjwani	2000	Kanand	Pune, Velhe	Earthfill; Gravity	52.82	1730	6871	104690.00	6410	104480.00	Irrigation	1175
Chilewadi	2000	Mandvi	Pune, Junnar	Earthfill	62.56	440	36.23	27170.00	67410	24610.00	Irrigation	1680
Nira Devghar	2000	Nira	Pune, Bhor	Earthfill	58.53	2430	99.38	337390.00	14307	332130.00	Irrigation	1852
Kar	2000	Kar	Wardha	Earthfill	25.13	1067	265.06	25960.00	4480	21060.00	Irrigation	2314
Dimbhe	2000	Ghod	Pune, Ambegaon	Gravity	67.21	852	1151.23	38220.00	17547	35391.00	Irrigation	2872
Bhama Asakhed	2000	Bhama	Pune, Chakan	Earthfill	51	1425	6183	230473.00	21630	217100.00	Irrigation	3431.72
Wan	2000	Wan	Akola	Earthfill; Gravity	67.65	500	599	83465.00	4391	81955.00	Irrigation; Hydroelectricity; Water supply	3874
Berdewadi	2001	local	Lanja	Earthfill	61.19	656	1796.2	15841.00	871	15356.00	Irrigation	296
Chitri	2001	Chitri	Kolhapur, Ajara	Earthfill	55.1	1710	2606	53414.00	2931	52359.00	Irrigation	571
Uttarmand	2001	Uttarmand	Satara, Patan	Earthfill	46.45	1389		24925.00	2393		Irrigation	824
Jamkhedi	2001	Jamkhedi	Dhule, Sakri	Earthfill	29.62	1750	710	14450.00	2081	12290.00	Irrigation	1113
Bhivargi	2001	Patan	Sangli, Jath	Earthfill	15.85	1606		11200.00		8630.00	Irrigation	
Madan	2002	Waghadinalla	Arvi	Earthfill	26.55	1291	976.14	11460.00		10460.00	Irrigation	662.5
Babhulgaon	2003	local	Solapur, Barshi	Earthfill	16.93	16.5	56100	56100.00	2270		Irrigation	1046
Chargad	2003	Chargad	Amravati	Earthfill	24.5	3740	1095	12005.00	2842	8266.00	Irrigation; Water Supply	1107.5
Andra Valley	2003	Andra	Pune, Maval	Earthfill	40.45	330	207.86	83310.00	7421	82750.00	Irrigation	1110
Pentakali	2003	Penganga	Buldhana, Mehkar	Earthfill	27.5	990	694.35	67355.00	12870	59976.00	Irrigation	6476
Kudnur	2005	local	Chandgad	Earthfill	20.99	316	208.68	11925.00	214	1062.00	Irrigation	58.24
Deogad	2005	Karli Nalla	Phonda	Earthfill	54.68	1784	6200	100428.00	5731	98020.00	Irrigation; Hydroelectricity	2078
Shivana Takli	2005	Shivna	Kannad	Earthfill	17.7	4524	622	39360.00	887	38190.00	Irrigation	4415
Popatkhed	2005	Dather	Akot	Earthfill	42.6			12192.00		10709.00	Irrigation	
Morbe	2006	Dhavari	Khalapur	Gravity	59.1	3420	18075	19089.00	9780	160.01	Water supply	690.4
Lalocalalla	2006	local	Samudrapur	Earthfill	13.9	3385	407.67	29515.00	9039	27613.00	Irrigation	925
Morana (Gureghar)	2006	Morana	Patan	Earthfill	47.02	420		39550.00	31.27	36990.00	Irrigation	1360.11
Tarandale	2007	local	Kankawali	Earthfill	48	400		10800.00		9810.00		147.7
Kalmodi	2007	Arala	Khed	Gravity	40.6	104	139.28	42670.00	2710	42670.00	Irrigation	963.21
Sina Kolegaon	2007	Sina	Osmanabad, Paranda	Earthfill	36.6		234	150490.00	1529	89340.00	Irrigation	7689
Katangi		Katanginalla	Goregaon	Earthfill	13.65	2360	464.12	11120.00	31.02	9400.00	Irrigation	845.5
Bham		Tapi	Dharni	Earthfill; Gravity	67.5	10982		378,000.00	1551.6	378,000.00	Irrigation	445
Sarang Kheda		Waki	Nashik, Sinnar	Earthfill	34.5	1081	76.2	75800.00	7203	70550.00	Irrigation	563
Chenna		Chenna	Gadchiroli	Earthfill	33	740	413	14800.00	1930	14790.00	Irrigation	602
Madan		local	Madan	Earthfill	26.5	1413	773	11460.00		10560.00	Irrigation	662
Godavari		Darna	Nashik, Igatpuri	Earthfill	34.75	1028	3007	46730.00	2565	40790.00	Irrigation	662
Karwappa		Karwappa	Gadchiroli	Earthfill	35	1416	991	32560.00	4454	32560.00	Irrigation	841
Manikpuri		Waki	Nandurbar, Shahada	Earthfill	42.84	888	1453	14760.00	650	13450.00	Irrigation	912
Lower Tapi		Kadwa	Nashik	Earthfill	21.8	860	303.72	16460.00	3150	11470.00	Irrigation	983
Bhavali		Bham	Thane, Shahapur	Earthfill	33.97	1550	329	75050.00	4980	69760.00	Irrigation	990
Jamkhed		local	Mukhed	Earthfill	16.9	1605	44	10230.00		8150.00	Irrigation	1019
Nagan		Nagan	Navapur	Earthfill	29.24	2940	1800	25150.00	3334	22760.00	Irrigation	1103
Talamba		Karli	Kudal	Earthfill	57.41	2955	7343	308750.00	21350	285630.00	Irrigation; Hydroelectricity	1354.47
Wakod		Nagzari	Aurangabad	Earthfill	14.28	2975	577	12050.00	4480	11400.00	Irrigation	1380
Mahamadwadi		Gad river	Konakwadi	Earthfill	59.33	1590	12000	93374.00	4243	91399.00	Irrigation; Hydroelectricity	1678
Lower Panzara (Akkalp)		Punad	Kalwan	Earthfill	33.28	706	1114	39750.00	3123	36990.00	Irrigation	1791
Waki		Godavari	Pachora	Earthfill	51.87	869	4582	53730.00	2054	53340.00	Irrigation	1808
Dara		Shiwan	Nandurbar	Earthfill	31.3	4828	2410	24180.00	2070	21700.00	Irrigation; Water Supply	1864
Upper Kadwa		Manyad	Nandgaon	Earthfill	32.92	1470	471.66	14010.00	238	9460.00	Irrigation	2032
Gomai		Gomai	Nandurbar, Shahada	Earthfill	23.9	5596	1391	28104.00	5920	20352.00	Irrigation	2049
Utawali		Utawali	Buldhana, Mehkar	Earthfill	26.05	2112	1910	20808.00	3642		Irrigation	2336
Chandrabhaga		Chandrabhaga	Amravati	Earthfill	44.7	1573	2952	41427.00	3262	41248.00	Irrigation; Hydroelectricity; Water supply	2476
Tultuli		Khobragadi	Gadchiroli	Earthfill	21.59	5280	2745	225051.00	50920	216948.00	Irrigation	3460
Purna		Purna	Amravati	Earthfill	38	3120	1277	41759.00	5880	35370.00	Irrigation; Hydroelectricity; Water supply	3906
Anjneri		Panzara	Sakri	Earthfill	32.3	3137	4326	107790.00	14815	87870.00	Irrigation	4332
Nawatha		Burai	Dhule	Earthfill	29	2610	1427	36930.00	7360	33910.00	Irrigation	4342
Human		Human	Chandrapur	Earthfill; Gravity	28	3222	2448	313731.00	80930	313731.00	Irrigation	9242
Prakasha Barrage		Tapi	Nandurbar	Earthfill	39.5	1070	179	325000.00	3850	248210.00	Irrigation	16071
Lower Wardha		Wardha	Wardha	Earthfill; Gravity	27.8	9464	2639	253340.00	54654	216870.00	Irrigation	20788
Dhaner		Tapi	Burhanpur	Gravity	27.7	425		141000.00	170	141000.00	Irrigation	21083
Nanduri		Tapi	Ama Local Nallaher	Earthfill; Gravity	20	2186	1381.25	42056.00	575.36	35780.00	Irrigation; Water supply	49299.5
Sulwade Barrage		Tapi	Nandurbar, Shahada	Earthfill	27.73	688	226	63640.00	11870	62110.00	Irrigation	50517
Wadishewadi		Tapi	Nandurbar, Shahada	Earthfill	36.5	614.5	324	92190.00	18230	91810.00	Irrigation	50529
Dehali		Tapi	Sind Kheda	Earthfill	28.26	5349	1762	65060.00	1229	65060.00	Irrigation; Water Supply	64227
Gosi (Kd)		Wainganga	Bhandara	Earthfill	22.5	1135	3828	769483.00	22258	376592.00	Irrigation	67000
Punad		Delhi	Nandurbar, Akkalkuva	Earthfill	29.62	1820	123	19080.00	2202	17290.00	Irrigation	

== Mizoram ==
River	Dam	Height	Length	Type	Storage capacity	Reservoir area	Complete
Serlui	Serlui B Dam						River Serlui
Sonai	Tuirial Dam						

== Odisha ==
River	Dam	Height	Length	Type	Storage capacity	Reservoir area	Complete
Sileru	Balimela Reservoir						
Mahanadi	Hirakud Dam	60.96 m	4,800 m	Earth-fill, Gravity & Masonry dam	195.68 m	192.024 m	1957
Sileru	Jalaput Dam						
Sabari	Kolab Dam						
Sankh	Mandira Dam						
Jonk	Patora Dam						
Brahmani	Rengali Dam						
Indravati	Indravati Dam						
Salia River	Salia Dam						
Sono River	Sunei Dam						
Kala River	Kala Dam						

== Punjab ==
River	Dam	Height	Length	Type	Storage capacity	Reservoir area	Complete
Damsal River	Damsal Dam	26.5 meters	160 meters	Earth-fill		1,920 hectares	2001
Ravi River	Ranjit Sagar Dam	160 meters	617 meters	Earth-cum-concrete gravity dam	3,280 million cubic meters	8,700 hectares	2001
Ravi River	Shahpurkandi Dam	55.5 meters	700 meters	Gravity	230 million cubic meters	5,000 hectares	2025

== Rajasthan ==
River	Dam	Height	Length	Type	Storage capacity	Reservoir area	Complete
Chambal	Jawahar Sagar Dam						
Chambal	Gandhi Sagar Dam						
Chambal	Kota Barrage						
Chambal	Rana Pratap Sagar dam						
Chavli	Chavli Dam					HIMMAT GARH	2006
Mahi	Mahi Bajaj Sagar Dam						
Jakham	Jakham Dam						
Kalisindh	Kalisindh Dam						
Banas	Bisalpur Dam						
Banas	Isarda Dam						
Dheel	Dheel Dam						
Orai	Bassi dam		1044 metres	Earthed			1987

== Sikkim ==
River	Dam	Height	Length	Type	Storage capacity	Reservoir area	Complete
Rangit River	Rangit Dam						

== Tamil Nadu ==
River	Dam	Height	Length	Type	Storage capacity	Reservoir area	Complete.
Noyyal	Aathupalayam Dam						1992 (closed 1995 due to pollution)
	Aliyar Reservoir				3.869 TMC Ft		1969
	Amaravathi Dam				4 TMC ft		1957
Bhavani	Bhavanisagar Reservoir				32.8 TMC ft		1955
	Gomukhinadhi Reservoir						1965
Bhavani	Kodiveri Dam						17th Century
Kaveri	Mettur Dam				93.4 TMC ft		1934
	Lower Anicut (Built by British)						19th century
	Kallanai Dam (Built by Chola)						2nd century AD
	Nallathangal Dam						2007
Noyyal	Orathuppalayam Dam						1992
	Pechiparai Reservoir						1906
	Perunchani Reservoir						1952
	Puzhal Reservoir						1876
	Sathanur Reservoir						1958
	Solaiyar Dam						1965
Vaigai	Vaigai Dam						1959
	Vaigai Reservoir						1959
Thamirabarani	Manimuthar Dam & Karaiyar Dam(Papanasam Reservoir)						1957

== Telangana ==
River	Dam	Height	Length	Type	Storage capacity	Reservoir area	Complete
Godavari River	Sriram Sagar Project				90.31		1977
Godavari River	Singur Dam				29.91		1989
Godavari River	Nizam Sagar				17.8		1931
Godavari River	Yellampalli dam				20.17		2016
Godavari River	Lower Manair Dam				24.07		1985
Godavari River	Mid Manair Dam				25.87		2017
Godavari River	Upper Manair Dam				2.2		1985
Godavari River	Medigadda Barrage				16.17		2019
Godavari River	Annaram Barrage				11.9		2019
Godavari River	Sundilla Barrage				5.11		2019
Godavari River	Kaddam Reservoir				7.6		1958
Godavari River	Sri Komaram Bheem Project						2011
Godavari River	Dummugudem Lift Irrigation Scheme						
Godavari River	Vattivagu Reservoir						
Godavari River	Pranahita Chevella						
Godavari River	Icchampally Project						
Godavari River	Swarna Reservoir						
Godavari River	Sathnala Dam						
Godavari River	Nawabpet Reservoir						
Godavari River	Tapaspalli Reservoir						
Godavari River	Pocharam Dam Reservoir						
Godavari River	Manjeera Reservoir						
Godavari River	Devadula project						
Godavari River	Pakhala Reservoir						
Godavari River	Palakurthy Reservoir						
Godavari River	Kinnerasani Reservoir						
Godavari River	Kanthapally Barrage						
Godavari River	Alisagar Reservoir						1931
Godavari River	Alisagar Lift Irrigation Scheme						2002
Godavari River	Lower Penganga River Irrigation Project						1997
Godavari River	Lendi Dam						
Godavari River	Sadarmat				1.58		
Godavari River	Pedavagu						
Godavari River	Neelwai						
Godavari River	Ralevagu						
Godavari River	Gollavagu						
Godavari River	Suddavagu						
Godavari River	Chelmelavagu Project (NTR Sagar)						
Godavari River	PP Rao Project						
Krishna River	Nagarjuna Sagar Dam				312.04		1967
Krishna River	Nagarjuna Sagar tail pond						
Krishna River	Srisailam Dam				215.807		1984
Krishna River	Srisailam tail pond						u/c
Krishna River	Jurala Project				9.66		1995
Krishna River	Pulichinthala Project				45.77		
Krishna River	Lower Jurala HEP						
Krishna River	Rajolibanda Dam						1956
Krishna River	Dindi Reservoir						
Krishna River	Osman Sagar Reservoir						
Krishna River	Himayath Sagar						
Krishna River	Musi Reservoir						
Krishna River	Koilsagar						
	Mathadivagu Reservoir						
Krishna River	Shankara Samudram Balancing Reservoir						
Krishna River	Alimineti Madhava Reddy Project						
Krishna River	Udaya Samudram Balancing Reservoir						
	Peddadevulapally Balancing Reservoir						
Krishna River	Ramanpad reservoir						
Krishna River	Gundrevula reservoir						
Krishna River	Singotam reservoir						
Krishna River	Jonnalaboguda reservoir						
Godavari River	Pulkurthy Reservoir						
	Salivagu Reservoir						
	Nashkal Reservoir						
	Mylaram Reservoir						
	Chakunta Reservoir						
	Chalivagu Reservoir						
	Narsingapur Reservoir						
	Bheemghanpur Reservoir						
	Rangaiah-Yerraiah Reservoir						
	Wyra Reservoir						
Krishna River	Palair Reservoir						
	Shanigaram Reservoir						
	Thotapally Reservoir						

== Uttarakhand ==
Dam	River	Height	Length	Type	Installed Capacity	Reservoir area	Completion Year
Ichari Dam	Tons						
Koteshwar Dam	Bhagirathi	97.5 m (320 ft)	300 m (984 ft)	Gravity	400 MW	29 km^{2} (11 sq mi)	2011
Maneri Dam	Bhagirathi	39 m (128 ft)	127 m (417 ft)	Gravity	90 MW at Tiloth Power Plant	1.8 km^{2} (0.69 sq mi)	
Tapovan Vishnugad Dam	Dhauliganga			Run of the River	520 MW	No Reservoir	Under Construction
Tehri Dam	Bhagirathi	260 m (853 ft)	575 m (1,886 ft)	Embankment Earth and Rock fill	1000 MW	52 km^{2} (20 sq mi)	2006
Ramganga Dam(Kalagarh Dam)	Ramganga	128 m (420 ft)	630 m (2,067 ft)	Embankment Earth and Rock fill	198 MW	78.31 km^{2} (30.24 sq mi)	1974
Vishnuprayag Dam	Alaknanda	17 m (56 ft)	57 m (187 ft)	Run of the River	400 MW		2006

=== Barrages ===
Barrage	River	Headworks of	Installed Capacity	Reservoir area	Completion Year
Asan Barrage	Yamuna	Hathnikund Barrage downstream	30 MW at Kulhal Power Station 72 MW at Khara Power Station	4 km^{2} (2 sq mi)	1967
Banbasa Barrage	Sharda	Upper Ganges Canal			1983
Bhimgoda Barrage	Ganga	Upper Ganges Canal	20.4 MW at Pathri Power Plant 9.3 MW at Mohammadpur Power Plant		1983
Dakpathar Barrage	Yamuna	Shakti Canal	33.75 MW at Dhakrani Power Plant 51 MW at Dhalipur Power Plant	29 km^{2} (11 sq mi)	1965
Joshiyara Barrage	Bhagirathi	Dharasu Power Plant downstream	304 MW at Dharasu Power Station		2008
Kosi Barrage	Kosi River	Kosi downstream	600 KW at Dharasu Power Station		2012
Pashulok Barrage	Ganga	Chilla Power Plant downstream	144 MW at Chilla Power Plant		1980
Tanakpur Barrage	Sharda	Banbasa Barrage downstream	120 MW		1989

== West Bengal ==
River	Dam	Height	Length	Gates	Storage capacity	Reservoir area
Damodar River	Durgapur Barrage	42.25 m	692 m	48		729,000 m^{3}
Ganges River	Farakka Barrage	36 m	2304 m	123		1,65,606,000 m^{3}
Damodar River	Panchet Dam	36 m	1225 m	36		900,000 m^{3}
Barakar River	Maithon Dam	30 m	900 m	20		841,000 m^{3}
Kangsabati River	Mukutmanipur Dam	26 m	400 m	16		576,000 m^{3}
Teesta River	Teesta Barrage	26 m	2025 m	60		1,024,000 m^{3}

== See also ==
- List of largest reservoirs in India
- List of lakes of India
- List of rivers of India by discharge
- Kalpasar Project
- Indian Rivers Inter-link
- Interstate River Water Disputes Act
- Irrigation in India
- National Water Policy
