= Morana =

Morana may refer to:

- Moraña, a municipality in Galicia, Spain
- Morana Dam, an earthfill dam on Morana river near Patan, Satara district in the state of Maharashtra in India
- Marzanna, Slavic goddess of death
- Morana (film), a 1994 Slovenian film
- Morana Sharp, 1874, a genus of pselaphid beetles
- Morana (goddess), a Slavic goddess of death and rebirth
