= Koradi Dam =

- Location within Maharashtra
- Official name: Koradi Dam D01436
- Location: Mehkar
- Coordinates: 20.2110225°N 76.5043795°E
- Opening date: 1979
- Owners: Government of Maharashtra, India

Dam and spillways
- Type of dam: Earthfill
- Impounds: Koradi river
- Height: 19.31 m (63.4 ft)
- Length: 900 m (3,000 ft)
- Dam volume: 1,193 km^{3} (286 cu mi)

Reservoir
- Total capacity: 15,120 km^{3} (3,630 cu mi)
- Surface area: 6,465 km^{2} (2,496 sq mi)

Koradi Dam, is an earthfill dam on the Koradi river near Mehkar, Buldhana district in the state of Maharashtra in India.

== Specifications ==
The height of the dam above lowest foundation is 19.31 m (63.4 ft) while the length is 900 m (3,000 ft). The volume content is 1,193 km^{3} (286 cu mi) and gross storage capacity is 22,500.00 km^{3} (5,398.04 cu mi).

== Purpose ==
- Irrigation

== See also ==
- Dams in Maharashtra
- List of reservoirs and dams in India
