= Waghadi Dam =

- Location within Maharashtra
- Official name: Waghadi Dam D01427
- Location: Ghatanji
- Coordinates: 20.2634854°N 78.3078003°E
- Opening date: 1978
- Owners: Government of Maharashtra, India

Dam and spillways
- Type of dam: Earthfill; Gravity
- Impounds: Waghadi river
- Height: 26 m (85 ft)
- Length: 960 m (3,150 ft)
- Dam volume: 773 km^{3} (185 cu mi)

Reservoir
- Total capacity: 35,360 km^{3} (8,480 cu mi)
- Surface area: 6,580 km^{2} (2,540 sq mi)

Waghadi Dam, is an earthfill and gravity dam on Waghadi river near Ghatanji, Yavatmal district in the state of Maharashtra in India.

== Specifications ==
The height of the dam above its lowest foundation is 26 m (85 ft) while the length is 960 m (3,150 ft). The volume content is 773 km^{3} (185 cu mi) and gross storage capacity is 41,110.00 km^{3} (9,862.81 cu mi).

== Purpose ==
- Irrigation

== See also ==
- Dams in Maharashtra
- List of reservoirs and dams in India
