= Dolwahal Dam =

weir dam
- Location within Maharashtra
- Official name: weir Dam (Weir) Dam D03733
- Location: Roha
- Coordinates: 18.426036°N 73.220412°E
- Opening date: 1969
- Owners: Government of Maharashtra, India

Dam and spillways
- Type of dam: Earthfill
- Impounds: Kundlika river
- Height: 12.5 m (41 ft)
- Length: 543 m (1,781 ft)
- Dam volume: 1,943 km^{3} (466 cu mi)

Reservoir
- Total capacity: 1,840 km^{3} (440 cu mi)
- Surface area: 3,230 km^{2} (1,250 sq mi)

Dolwahal Dam, also called Weir Dam is an earthfill dam on Kundalika river near Roha, Raigad district in the state of Maharashtra in India.

== Specifications ==
The height of the dam above lowest foundation is 12.5 m (41 ft) while the length is 543 m (1,781 ft). The volume content is 1,943 km^{3} (466 cu mi) and gross storage capacity is 10,070.00 km^{3} (2,415.92 cu mi).

== Purpose ==
- Irrigation
- Water Supply

== See also ==
- Dams in Maharashtra
- List of reservoirs and dams in India
