= Pethwadaj Dam =

- Location within Maharashtra
- Official name: Pethwadaj Dam D01397
- Location: Kandhar
- Coordinates: 18.775361°N 77.3176256°E
- Opening date: 1980
- Owners: Government of Maharashtra, India

Dam and spillways
- Type of dam: Earthfill
- Impounds: local river
- Height: 19.5 m (64 ft)
- Length: 1,260 m (4,130 ft)
- Dam volume: 495 km^{3} (119 cu mi)

Reservoir
- Total capacity: 9,040 km^{3} (2,170 cu mi)
- Surface area: 2,970 km^{2} (1,150 sq mi)

Pethwadaj Dam is an earthfill dam on local river near Kandhar, Nanded district in the state of Maharashtra in India.

== Specifications ==
The height of the dam above lowest foundation is 19.5 m (64 ft) while the length is 1,260 m (4,130 ft). The volume content is 495 km^{3} (119 cu mi) and gross storage capacity is 11,600.00 km^{3} (2,782.99 cu mi).

== Purpose ==
- Irrigation

== See also ==
- Dams in Maharashtra
- List of reservoirs and dams in India
