= Hingani Dam =

- Location within Maharashtra
- Official name: Hingani (Pangaon) Dam D01362
- Location: Barshi
- Coordinates: 18.1347177°N 75.8366489°E
- Opening date: 1977
- Owners: Government of Maharashtra, India

Dam and spillways
- Type of dam: Earthfill
- Impounds: Bhogawati river
- Height: 21.87 m (71.8 ft)
- Length: 2,193 m (7,195 ft)
- Dam volume: 74 km^{3} (18 cu mi)

Reservoir
- Total capacity: 31,970 km^{3} (7,670 cu mi)
- Surface area: 0 km^{2} (0 sq mi)

Hingani Dam, also called Pangaon Dam is an earthfill dam on Bhogawati river near Barshi, Solapur district in state of Maharashtra in India.

== Specifications ==
The height of the dam above lowest foundation is 21.87 m (71.8 ft) while the length is 2,193 m (7,195 ft). The volume content is 74 km^{3} (18 cu mi) and the gross storage capacity is 45,510.00 km^{3} (10,918.43 cu mi).

== Purpose ==
- Irrigation

== See also ==
- Dams in Maharashtra
- List of reservoirs and dams in India
