= Sarang Kheda Dam =

- Interactive map of Sarang Kheda Dam
- Official name: Sarang Kheda Dam
- Location: Sarengkheda
- Owners: Government of Maharashtra, India

Dam and spillways
- Type of dam: Earthfill
- Impounds: Tapi river
- Height: 34.5 m (113 ft)
- Length: 1,081 m (3,547 ft)
- Dam volume: 76.2 km^{3} (18.3 cu mi)

Reservoir
- Total capacity: 70,550 km^{3} (16,930 cu mi)
- Surface area: 7,203 km^{2} (2,781 sq mi)

Sarang Kheda Dam is an earthfill dam on Tapi River near Sarengkheda village in the state of Maharashtra in India. The dam's purpose is irrigation.

== Specifications ==
The height of the dam above the lowest foundation is 34.5 m (113 ft), while the length is 1,081 m (3,547 ft). The volume content is 76.2 km^{3} (18.3 cu mi) and gross storage capacity is 75,800.00 km^{3} (18,185.39 cu mi).

== See also ==
- Dams in Maharashtra
- List of reservoirs and dams in India
