= Mhaswad Dam =

Rajewadi Dam
- Location within Maharashtra
- Official name: Mhaswad dam D00984
- Location: Maan, Maharashtra
- Coordinates: 17.5911341°N 74.8734569°E
- Opening date: 1887
- Owners: Government of Maharashtra, India

Dam and spillways
- Type of dam: Earthfill
- Impounds: Maan river
- Height: 24 m (79 ft)
- Length: 2,473 m (8,114 ft)

Reservoir
- Total capacity: 46,210 km^{3} (11,090 cu mi)
- Surface area: 16,251 km^{2} (6,275 sq mi)

Mhaswad Dam, (also called Rajewadi dam) is an earthfill dam on Man river near Maan, Satara district in the state of Maharashtra in India.

== Specifications ==
The height of the dam above lowest foundation is 24 m (79 ft) while the length is 2,473 m (8,114 ft). The gross storage capacity is 47,880.00 km^{3} (11,487.02 cu mi).

== Purpose ==
- Irrigation

== See also ==
- Dams in Maharashtra
- List of reservoirs and dams in India
