= Sakat Dam =

- Location within Maharashtra
- Official name: Sakat Dam D02935
- Location: Paranda
- Coordinates: 18.3875349°N 75.5021828°E
- Opening date: 1994
- Owners: Government of Maharashtra, India

Dam and spillways
- Type of dam: Earthfill
- Impounds: Dudhana river
- Height: 19.8 m (65 ft)
- Length: 2,775 m (9,104 ft)
- Dam volume: 0 km^{3} (0 cu mi)

Reservoir
- Total capacity: 13,440 km^{3} (3,220 cu mi)
- Surface area: 4,340 km^{2} (1,680 sq mi)

Sakat Dam, is an earthfill dam on Dudhana river near Paranda, Osmanabad district in state of Maharashtra in India.

== Specifications ==
The height of the dam above lowest foundation is 19.8 m (65 ft) while the length is 2,775 m (9,104 ft). The volume content is 0 km^{3} (0 cu mi) and gross storage capacity is 14,430.00 km^{3} (3,461.94 cu mi).

== Purpose ==
- Irrigation

== See also ==
- Dams in Maharashtra
- List of reservoirs and dams in India
