= Gomukhinadhi Reservoir =

Reservoir in Tamil Nadu, India

Gomukhinadhi Reservoir is located in the Kalrayan Hills near Kallakurichi in Kallakurichi district of Tamil Nadu, India. The man-made lake covers an area of 10,800 acres during normal monsoon seasons. It serves 47 villages and has a maximum storage height of 46 feet. Villages that it serves include Vadakkanandal, Mathur, Mannmalai, Madhavacheri, Palrampattu, Karadichithur, and Thevadipattu in Kallakurichi block. The newest part of the dam covers 5,000 acres and the oldest part of the dam covers 5,800 acres. The reservoir provides a reliable water source for the farmers, who have for generations grown crops requiring large amounts of water such as rice and sugarcane.

== See also ==
- Dams and reservoirs in India
- List of dams and reservoirs in India
