= Nawegaonbandh Dam =

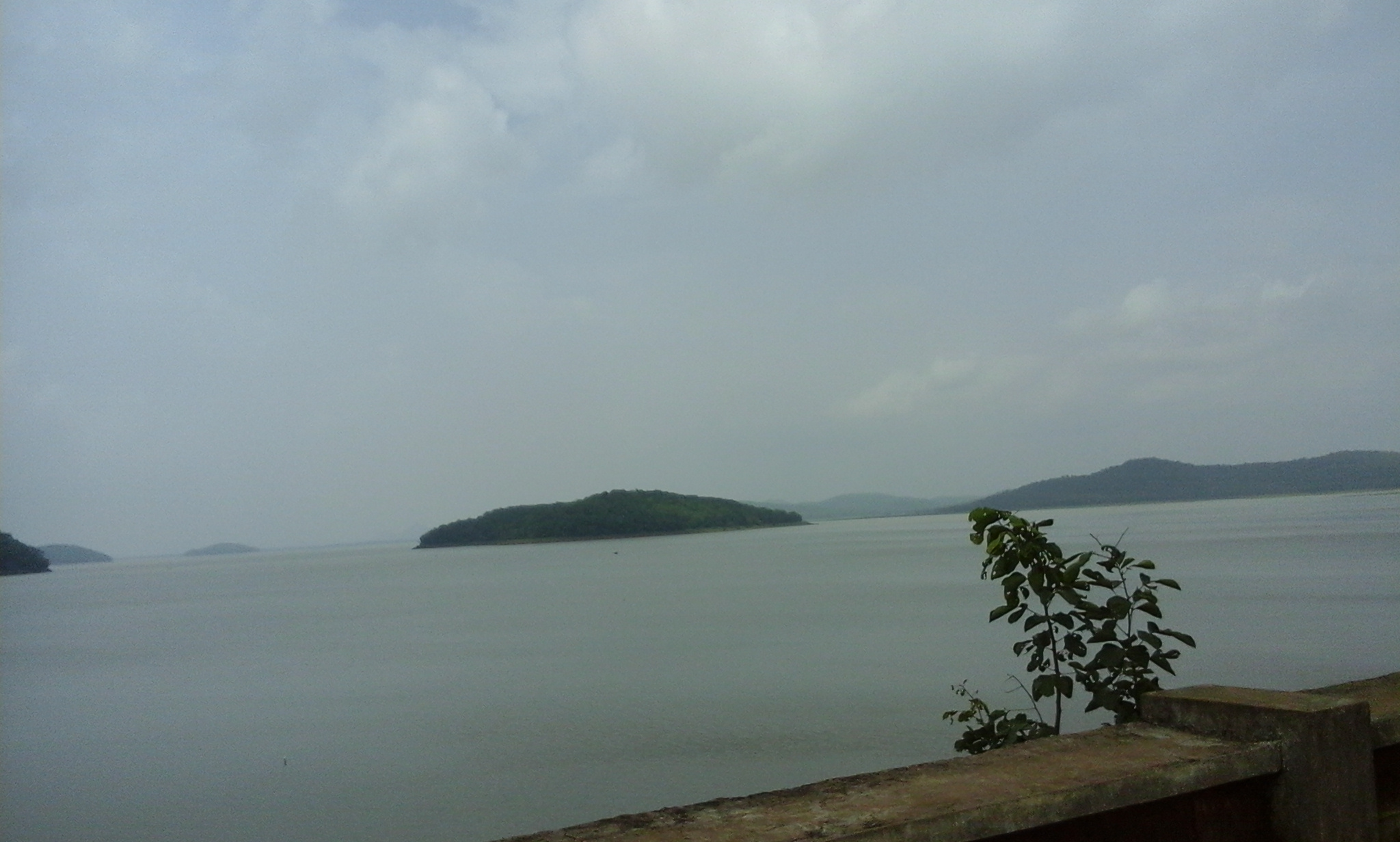

- Location within Maharashtra
- Official name: Nawegaonbandh Dam
- Location: Navegaon
- Coordinates: 20.9110352°N 80.1274109°E
- Opening date: 1967
- Owners: Government of Maharashtra, India

Dam and spillways
- Type of dam: Earthfill
- Impounds: local river
- Height: 11.58 m (38.0 ft)
- Length: 625 m (2,051 ft)

Reservoir
- Total capacity: 29,590 km^{3} (7,100 cu mi)
- Surface area: 10,344 km^{2} (3,994 sq mi)

Nawegaonbandh Dam, is an earthfill dam on local river near Navegaon, Gondia district in the state of Maharashtra in India.

== Specifications ==
The height of the dam above lowest foundation is 11.58 m (38.0 ft) while the length is 625 m (2,051 ft). The volume gross storage capacity is 45,943.00 km^{3} (11,022.31 cu mi).

== Purpose ==
- Irrigation

== See also ==
- Dams in Maharashtra
- List of reservoirs and dams in India
