= Vishwamitri Dam =

- Location within Maharashtra
- Official name: Vishwamitri Dam
- Location: Patur
- Coordinates: 20.4137907°N 76.769971°E
- Opening date: 1996
- Owners: Government of Maharashtra, India

Dam and spillways
- Type of dam: Earthfill
- Impounds: Vishwamitri river
- Height: 21.06 m (69.1 ft)
- Length: 1,275 m (4,183 ft)
- Dam volume: 565 km^{3} (136 cu mi)

Reservoir
- Total capacity: 0 km^{3} (0 cu mi)
- Surface area: 1,766 km^{2} (682 sq mi)

Vishwamitri Dam, is an earthfill dam on Vishwamitri river near Patur in Akola district in the state of Maharashtra in India.

== Specifications ==
The height of the dam above its lowest foundation is 21.06 m (69.1 ft) while the length is 1,275 m (4,183 ft). The volume content is 565 km^{3} (136 cu mi) and gross storage capacity is 10,116.00 km^{3} (2,426.96 cu mi).

== Purpose ==
- Irrigation

== See also ==
- Dams in Maharashtra
- List of reservoirs and dams in India
