= Sonal Dam =

- Location within Maharashtra
- Official name: Sonal Dam D01374
- Location: M Pir
- Coordinates: 20.3230174°N 77.206496°E
- Opening date: 1981
- Owners: Government of Maharashtra, India

Dam and spillways
- Type of dam: Earthfill
- Impounds: Aran river
- Height: 19.6 m (64 ft)
- Length: 1,114 m (3,655 ft)
- Dam volume: 698 km^{3} (167 cu mi)

Reservoir
- Total capacity: 16,920 km^{3} (4,060 cu mi)
- Surface area: 0 km^{2} (0 sq mi)

Sonal Dam, is an earthfill dam on Aran river near Mangrulpir, Washim district in the state of Maharashtra in India.

== Specifications ==
The height of the dam above lowest foundation is 19.6 m (64 ft) while the length is 1,114 m (3,655 ft). The volume content is 698 km^{3} (167 cu mi) and gross storage capacity is 20,270.00 km^{3} (4,863.03 cu mi).

== Purpose ==
- Irrigation

== See also ==
- Dams in Maharashtra
- List of reservoirs and dams in India
