= Tisangi Dam =

- Location within Maharashtra
- Official name: Tisangi Dam D04942
- Location: Pandharpur
- Coordinates: 17.616047°N 75.218196°E
- Opening date: 1966
- Owners: Government of Maharashtra, India

Dam and spillways
- Type of dam: Earthfill
- Impounds: local river
- Height: 20.82 m (68.3 ft)
- Length: 2,866 m (9,403 ft)

Reservoir
- Total capacity: 22,760 km^{3} (5,460 cu mi)

Tisangi Dam, is an earthfill dam on local river near Pandharpur, Solapur district in the state of Maharashtra in India.

== Specifications ==
The height of the dam above its lowest foundation is 20.82 m (68.3 ft) while the length is 2,866 m (9,403 ft). The gross storage capacity is 24,460.00 km^{3} (5,868.27 cu mi).

== Purpose ==
- Irrigation

== See also ==
- Dams in Maharashtra
- List of reservoirs and dams in India
