= Pothara Dam =

- Location within Maharashtra
- Official name: Pothara Dam
- Location: Hinganghat
- Coordinates: 20.5582241°N 79.0411377°E
- Opening date: 1983
- Owners: Government of Maharashtra, India

Dam and spillways
- Type of dam: Earthfill
- Impounds: Pothara river
- Height: 14.21 m (46.6 ft)
- Length: 2,220 m (7,280 ft)
- Dam volume: 318 km^{3} (76 cu mi)

Reservoir
- Total capacity: 34,720 km^{3} (8,330 cu mi)
- Surface area: 13,900 km^{2} (5,400 sq mi)

Pothara Dam, is an earthfill dam on Pothara river near Hinganghat, Wardha district in the state of Maharashtra in India.

== Specifications ==
The height of the dam above lowest foundation is 14.21 m (46.6 ft) while the length is 2,220 m (7,280 ft). The volume content is 318 km^{3} (76 cu mi) and gross storage capacity is 38,400.00 km^{3} (9,212.65 cu mi).

== Purpose ==
- Irrigation

== See also ==
- Dams in Maharashtra
- List of reservoirs and dams in India
