= Goki Dam =

- Location within Maharashtra
- Official name: Goki Dam D01438
- Location: Darwha
- Coordinates: 20.3008416°N 77.9177856°E
- Opening date: 1981
- Owners: Government of Maharashtra, India

Dam and spillways
- Type of dam: Earthfill; Gravity
- Impounds: Goki river
- Height: 23.06 m (75.7 ft)
- Length: 1,572 m (5,157 ft)
- Dam volume: 658 km^{3} (158 cu mi)

Reservoir
- Total capacity: 42,710 km^{3} (10,250 cu mi)
- Surface area: 11,360 km^{2} (4,390 sq mi)

Goki Dam, is an earthfill and gravity dam on Goki river near Darwha, Yavatmal district in state of Maharashtra in India.

== Specifications ==
The height of the dam above lowest foundation is 23.06 m (75.7 ft) while the length is 1,572 m (5,157 ft). The volume content is 658 km^{3} (158 cu mi) and gross storage capacity is 50,220.00 km^{3} (12,048.42 cu mi).

== Purpose ==
- Irrigation
- Water supply

== See also ==
- Dams in Maharashtra
- List of reservoirs and dams in India
