= Bahula Dam =

- Location within Maharashtra
- Official name: Bahula Dam
- Location: Khedgaon
- Coordinates: 20.6935931°N 75.3965949°E
- Opening date: 1997
- Owners: Government of Maharashtra, India

Dam and spillways
- Type of dam: Earthfill
- Impounds: Bahula river
- Height: 17 m (56 ft)
- Length: 5,280 m (17,320 ft)
- Dam volume: 847,000 m^{3} (29,900,000 cu ft)

Reservoir
- Total capacity: 16,330,000 m^{3} (577,000,000 cu ft)
- Surface area: 0.581 km^{2} (0.224 sq mi)

Bahula Dam, is an earthfill dam on Bahula river in Pachora, Jalgaon district in the state of Maharashtra in India.

== Specifications ==
The height of the dam above lowest foundation is 17 m (56 ft) while the length is 5,280 m (17,320 ft). The volume content is 847,000 m^{3} (29,900,000 cu ft) and gross storage capacity is 20,030,000 m^{3} (707,000,000 cu ft).

== Purpose ==
- Irrigation

== See also ==
- Dams in Maharashtra
- List of reservoirs and dams in India
