= Uma Dam =

- Location within Maharashtra
- Official name: Uma Dam D01379
- Location: Murtijapur
- Coordinates: 20.604186°N 77.401128°E
- Opening date: 1981
- Owners: Government of Maharashtra, India

Dam and spillways
- Type of dam: Earthfill
- Impounds: Uma river
- Height: 20.42 m (67.0 ft)
- Length: 2,140 m (7,020 ft)
- Dam volume: 434 km^{3} (104 cu mi)

Reservoir
- Total capacity: 11,690 km^{3} (2,800 cu mi)
- Surface area: 2,600 km^{2} (1,000 sq mi)

Uma Dam, is an earthfill dam on the Uma river near Murtijapur, Akola district in the state of Maharashtra in India.

== Specifications ==
The height of the dam, measured from above its lowest foundation, is 20.42 m (67.0 ft) while the length is 2,140 m (7,020 ft). The volume content is 434 km^{3} (104 cu mi) and gross storage capacity is 14,010.00 km^{3} (3,361.18 cu mi).

== Purpose ==
- Irrigation

== See also ==
- Dams in Maharashtra
- List of reservoirs and dams in India
