= Babhulgaon Dam =

- Location within Maharashtra
- Official name: Babhulgaon Dam
- Location: Barshi
- Coordinates: 18.3214476°N 75.7810307°E
- Opening date: 2003
- Owners: Government of Maharashtra, India

Dam and spillways
- Type of dam: Earthfill
- Impounds: local river
- Height: 16.93 m (55.5 ft)
- Length: 16.5 m (54 ft)
- Dam volume: 56,100,000 m^{3} (1.98×10^{9} cu ft)

Reservoir
- Surface area: 2.270 km^{2} (0.876 sq mi)

Babhulgaon Dam, is an earthfill dam on local river near Barshi, Solapur district in state of Maharashtra in India.

== Specifications ==
The height of the dam above lowest foundation is 16.93 m (55.5 ft) while the length is 16.5 m (54 ft). The volume content is 56,100,000 m^{3} (1.98×10^{9} cu ft) and gross storage capacity is 56,100,000 km^{3} (13,500,000 cu mi).

== Purpose ==
- Irrigation

== See also ==
- Dams in Maharashtra
- List of reservoirs and dams in India
