= Makardhokada Dam =

- Location within Maharashtra
- Official name: Makardhokada Dam
- Location: Umred
- Coordinates: 20.8678°N 79.2126°E
- Opening date: 1978
- Owners: Government of Maharashtra, India

Dam and spillways
- Type of dam: Earthfill
- Impounds: Amb river
- Height: 18.81 m (61.7 ft)
- Length: 1,645 m (5,397 ft)
- Dam volume: 652.87 km^{3} (156.63 cu mi)

Reservoir
- Total capacity: 19,931 km^{3} (4,782 cu mi)
- Surface area: 322 km^{2} (124 sq mi)

Makardhokada Dam, is an earthfill dam on Amb river near Umred, Nagpur district in state of Maharashtra in India.

== Specifications ==
The height of the dam above lowest foundation is 18.81 m (61.7 ft) while the length is 1,645 m (5,397 ft). The volume content is 652.87 km^{3} (156.63 cu mi) and gross storage capacity is 21,356.00 km^{3} (5,123.58 cu mi).

== Purpose ==
- Irrigation

== See also ==
- Dams in Maharashtra
- List of reservoirs and dams in India
