= Khasapur Dam =

Khasapuri Dam
- Location within Maharashtra
- Official name: Khasapuri Dam D01181
- Location: Paranda
- Coordinates: 18.3058227°N 75.4808968°E
- Opening date: 1956
- Owners: Government of Maharashtra, India

Dam and spillways
- Type of dam: Earthfill
- Impounds: local river
- Height: 23.78 m (78.0 ft)
- Length: 1,882 m (6,175 ft)

Reservoir
- Total capacity: 15,830 km^{3} (3,800 cu mi)
- Surface area: 430 km^{2} (170 sq mi)

Khasapuri Dam, is an earthfill dam on local river near Paranda, Osmanabad district in State of Maharashtra in India.

== Specifications ==
The height of the dam above lowest foundation is 23.78 m (78.0 ft) while the length is 1,882 m (6,175 ft). The gross storage capacity is 19,830.00 km^{3} (4,757.47 cu mi).

== Purpose ==
- Irrigation

== See also ==
- Dams in Maharashtra
- List of reservoirs and dams in India
