= Popatkhed Dam =

- Location within Maharashtra
- Official name: Popatkhed Dam D04646
- Location: Akot
- Coordinates: 21.2042129°N 77.0844126°E
- Opening date: 2005
- Owners: Government of Maharashtra, India

Dam and spillways
- Type of dam: Earthfill
- Impounds: Dather river
- Height: 42.6 m (140 ft)

Reservoir
- Total capacity: 10,709 km^{3} (2,569 cu mi)

Popatkhed Dam, is an earthfill dam on Dather river near Akot, Akola district in the state of Maharashtra in India.

== Specifications ==
The height of the dam above lowest foundation is 42.6 m (140 ft). The gross storage capacity is 12,192.00 km^{3} (2,925.02 cu mi). The Dam is able to replenish dried borewells as far as 15 to 20 KM

== Purpose ==
- Irrigation

== See also ==
- Dams in Maharashtra
- List of reservoirs and dams in India
