= Kordi Dam =

- Location within Maharashtra
- Official name: Kordi Dam D03136
- Location: Navapur
- Coordinates: 21.230362°N 74.0330564°E
- Opening date: 1985
- Owners: Government of Maharashtra, India

Dam and spillways
- Type of dam: Earthfill
- Impounds: Kordi river
- Height: 27.75 m (91.0 ft)
- Length: 1,952 m (6,404 ft)
- Dam volume: 923 km^{3} (221 cu mi)

Reservoir
- Total capacity: 10,300 km^{3} (2,500 cu mi)
- Surface area: 1,677 km^{2} (647 sq mi)

Kordi Dam, is an earthfill dam on Kordi river near Navapur, Nandurbar district in state of Maharashtra in India.

== Specifications ==
The height of the dam above lowest foundation is 27.75 m (91.0 ft) while the length is 1,952 m (6,404 ft). The volume content is 923 km^{3} (221 cu mi) and gross storage capacity is 11,690.00 km^{3} (2,804.58 cu mi).

== Purpose ==
- Irrigation

== See also ==
- Dams in Maharashtra
- List of reservoirs and dams in India
