= Yelavi Dam =

- Location within Maharashtra
- Official name: Yelavi Dam D05080
- Location: Jath
- Coordinates: 17.19103°N 75.2992523°E
- Opening date: 1982
- Owners: Government of Maharashtra, India

Dam and spillways
- Type of dam: Earthfill
- Impounds: local river
- Height: 15.25 m (50.0 ft)
- Length: 764 m (2,507 ft)
- Dam volume: 111 km^{3} (27 cu mi)

Reservoir
- Total capacity: 2,180 km^{3} (520 cu mi)
- Surface area: 0 km^{2} (0 sq mi)

Yelavi Dam, is an earthfill dam on local river near Jat, Sangli district in the state of Maharashtra in India.

== Specifications ==
The height of the dam above its lowest foundation is 15.25 m (50.0 ft) while the length is 764 m (2,507 ft). The volume content is 111 km^{3} (27 cu mi) and gross storage capacity is 22,260.00 km^{3} (5,340.46 cu mi).

== Purpose ==
- Irrigation

== See also ==
- Dams in Maharashtra
- List of reservoirs and dams in India
