= Kundrala Dam =

- Location within Maharashtra
- Official name: Kundrala Dam D01263
- Location: Mukhed
- Coordinates: 18.5989971°N 77.3148531°E
- Opening date: 1969
- Owners: Government of Maharashtra, India

Dam and spillways
- Type of dam: Earthfill
- Impounds: local river
- Height: 18.5 m (61 ft)
- Length: 999 m (3,278 ft)
- Dam volume: 370 km^{3} (89 cu mi)

Reservoir
- Total capacity: 12,990 km^{3} (3,120 cu mi)
- Surface area: 253 km^{2} (98 sq mi)

Kundrala Dam, is an earthfill dam on local river near Mukhed, Nanded district in the state of Maharashtra in India.

== Specifications ==
The height of the dam above lowest foundation is 18.5 m (61 ft) while the length is 999 m (3,278 ft). The volume content is 370 km^{3} (89 cu mi) and gross storage capacity is 14,680.00 km^{3} (3,521.92 cu mi).

== Purpose ==
- Irrigation

== See also ==
- Dams in Maharashtra
- List of reservoirs and dams in India
