= Utawali Dam =

- Location within Maharashtra
- Official name: Utawali Dam D03131
- Location: Mehkar
- Coordinates: 20.414626°N 76.723194°E
- Demolition date: N/A
- Owners: Government of Maharashtra, India

Dam and spillways
- Type of dam: Earthfill
- Impounds: Utawali river
- Height: 26.05 m (85.5 ft)
- Length: 2,112 m (6,929 ft)
- Dam volume: 1,910 km^{3} (460 cu mi)

Reservoir
- Total capacity: 0 km^{3} (0 cu mi)
- Surface area: 3,642 km^{2} (1,406 sq mi)

Utawali Dam, is an earthfill dam on Utawali river near Mehkar, Buldhana district in the state of Maharashtra in India.

== Specifications ==
The height of the dam above its lowest foundation is 26.05 m (85.5 ft) while the length is 2,112 m (6,929 ft). The volume content is 1,910 km^{3} (460 cu mi) and gross storage capacity is 20,808.00 km^{3} (4,992.10 cu mi).

== Purpose ==
- Irrigation

== See also ==
- Dams in Maharashtra
- List of reservoirs and dams in India
