= Nirguna Dam =

- Location within Maharashtra
- Official name: Nirguna Dam D01287
- Location: Patur
- Coordinates: 20.3420516°N 76.8541878°E
- Opening date: 1975
- Owners: Government of Maharashtra, India

Dam and spillways
- Type of dam: Earthfill
- Impounds: Nirguna river
- Height: 25.7 m (84 ft)
- Length: 1,800 m (5,900 ft)
- Dam volume: 124 km^{3} (30 cu mi)

Reservoir
- Total capacity: 28,840 km^{3} (6,920 cu mi)
- Surface area: 4,760 km^{2} (1,840 sq mi)

Nirguna Dam is an earthfill dam on Nirguna River near Patur, Akola district, in the state of Maharashtra in India.

== Specifications ==
The height of the dam above its lowest foundation is 25.7 m (84 ft), while its length is 1,800 m (5,900 ft). Its volume content is 124 km^{3} (30 cu mi), and its gross storage capacity is 32,290.00 km^{3} (7,746.78 cu mi).

== Purpose ==
- Irrigation

== See also ==
- Dams in Maharashtra
- List of reservoirs and dams in India
