= Sonwad Dam =

- Location within Maharashtra
- Official name: Sonwad Dam D03051
- Location: Sindkheda
- Coordinates: 21.0671457°N 74.8353267°E
- Opening date: 1998
- Owners: Government of Maharashtra, India

Dam and spillways
- Type of dam: Earthfill
- Impounds: Sonwad river
- Height: 18.58 m (61.0 ft)
- Length: 4,699 m (15,417 ft)
- Dam volume: 614 km^{3} (147 cu mi)

Reservoir
- Total capacity: 9,530 km^{3} (2,290 cu mi)
- Surface area: 3,434 km^{2} (1,326 sq mi)

Sonwad Dam, is an earthfill dam on Sonwad river near Sindkheda, Dhule district in the state of Maharashtra in India.

== Specifications ==
The height of the dam above lowest foundation is 18.58 metres (61.0 ft) while the length is 4,699 metres (15,417 ft). The volume content is 614 cubic kilometres (147 cu mi) and gross storage capacity is 12,690.00 cubic kilometres (3,044.49 cu mi).

== Purpose ==
- Irrigation

== See also ==
- Dams in Maharashtra
- List of reservoirs and dams in India
