= Kurje Dam =

- Location within Maharashtra
- Official name: Kurje (Dhapcheri) Dam D03193
- Location: Dahanu
- Coordinates: 20.0757235°N 72.9492619°E
- Opening date: 1967
- Owners: Government of Maharashtra, India

Dam and spillways
- Type of dam: Earthfill
- Impounds: Viroli river
- Height: 22.96 m (75.3 ft)
- Length: 2,507.76 m (8,227.6 ft)
- Dam volume: 846.12 km^{3} (202.99 cu mi)

Reservoir
- Total capacity: 38,085 km^{3} (9,137 cu mi)
- Surface area: 5,620 km^{2} (2,170 sq mi)

Kurje Dam, also called Dhapcheri Dam, is an earthfill dam on local river named Viroli near Dahanu, Thane district in the state of Maharashtra in India.

== Specifications ==
The height of the dam above lowest foundation is 22.96 m (75.3 ft) while the length is 2,507.76 m (8,227.6 ft). The volume content is 846.12 km^{3} (202.99 cu mi) and gross storage capacity is 39,050.00 km^{3} (9,368.59 cu mi).

== Purpose ==
- Irrigation
- Water Supply

== See also ==
- Dams in Maharashtra
- List of reservoirs and dams in India
