= Narangi Dam =

- Location within Maharashtra
- Official name: Narangi Dam D03100
- Location: Vaijapur
- Coordinates: 19.9369835°N 74.7230225°E
- Opening date: 1998
- Owners: Government of Maharashtra, India

Dam and spillways
- Type of dam: Earthfill
- Impounds: local river
- Height: 16.5 m (54 ft)
- Length: 0 m (0 ft)
- Dam volume: 0 km^{3} (0 cu mi)

Reservoir
- Total capacity: 0 km^{3} (0 cu mi)
- Surface area: 0 km^{2} (0 sq mi)

Narangi Dam, also called as Vaijapur dam is an earthfill dam on local river near Vaijapur, Aurangabad district in the state of Maharashtra in India.

== Specifications ==
The height of the dam above lowest foundation is 16.5 m (54 ft) while the length is 0 m (0 ft). The volume content is 0 km^{3} (0 cu mi) and gross storage capacity is 13,290.00 km^{3} (3,188.44 cu mi).

== Purpose ==
- Irrigation

== See also ==
- Dams in Maharashtra
- List of reservoirs and dams in India
