= Anjanapalshi Dam =

- Location within Maharashtra
- Official name: Anjanapalshi Dam
- Location: Kannad
- Coordinates: 20.2928314°N 75.3153777°E
- Opening date: 1999
- Owners: Government of Maharashtra, India

Dam and spillways
- Type of dam: Earthfill
- Impounds: Anjana River
- Height: 19.4 m (64 ft)
- Length: 1,952 m (6,404 ft)
- Dam volume: 937,000 m^{3} (33,100,000 cu ft)

Reservoir
- Total capacity: 13,740,000 m^{3} (485,000,000 cu ft)
- Surface area: 3.887 km^{2} (1.501 sq mi)

Anjanapalshi Dam is an earth-fill dam in India on the Anjana River near Kannad, in the Aurangabad district of Maharashtra. It was created as a means of irrigation.

== Specifications ==
The height of the dam above lowest foundation is 19.4 m (64 ft) while the length is 1,952 m (6,404 ft). The volume content is 937,000 m^{3} (33,100,000 cu ft) and gross storage capacity is 15,550,000 m^{3} (549,000,000 cu ft).

== See also ==
- Dams in Maharashtra
- List of reservoirs and dams in India
