= Mun Dam =

- Location within Maharashtra
- Official name: Mun Dam D03055
- Location: Khamgaon
- Coordinates: 20.4621978°N 76.6615784°E
- Opening date: 1998
- Owners: Government of Maharashtra, India

Dam and spillways
- Type of dam: Earthfill
- Impounds: Mun river
- Height: 30.2 m (99 ft)
- Length: 1,466 m (4,810 ft)
- Dam volume: 1,362 km^{3} (327 cu mi)

Reservoir
- Total capacity: 36,830 km^{3} (8,840 cu mi)
- Surface area: 4,527 km^{2} (1,748 sq mi)

Mun Dam, is an earthfill dam on Mun river near Khamgaon in the Buldhana district in the state of Maharashtra in India.

== Specifications ==
The height of the dam above lowest foundation is 30.2 m (99 ft) while the length is 1,466 m (4,810 ft). The volume content is 1,362 km^{3} (327 cu mi) and gross storage capacity is 42,480.00 km^{3} (10,191.49 cu mi).

== Purpose ==
- Irrigation

== See also ==
- Dams in Maharashtra
- List of reservoirs and dams in India
