= Gomai Dam =

- Official name: Gomai Dam D03172
- Location: Shahada
- Demolition date: N/A
- Owners: Government of Maharashtra, India

Dam and spillways
- Type of dam: Earthfill
- Impounds: Gomai river
- Height: 23.9 m (78 ft)
- Length: 5,596 m (18,360 ft)
- Dam volume: 1,391 km^{3} (334 cu mi)

Reservoir
- Total capacity: 20,352 km^{3} (4,883 cu mi)
- Surface area: 5,920 km^{2} (2,290 sq mi)

Gomai Dam, is an earthfill dam on Gomai river near Shahada, Nandurbar district in state of Maharashtra in India.

== Specifications ==
The height of the dam above lowest foundation is 23.9 m (78 ft) while the length is 5,596 m (18,360 ft). The volume content is 1,391 km^{3} (334 cu mi) and gross storage capacity is 28,104.00 km^{3} (6,742.51 cu mi).

== Purpose ==
- Irrigation

== See also ==
- Dams in Maharashtra
- List of reservoirs and dams in India
