= Waki Dam =

- Location within Maharashtra
- Official name: Waki Dam D05046
- Location: Pachora
- Coordinates: 20.794714°N 75.730562°E
- Demolition date: N/A
- Owners: Government of Maharashtra, India

Dam and spillways
- Type of dam: Earthfill
- Impounds: Godavari river
- Height: 51.87 m (170.2 ft)
- Length: 869 m (2,851 ft)
- Dam volume: 4,582 km^{3} (1,099 cu mi)

Reservoir
- Total capacity: 53,340 km^{3} (12,800 cu mi)
- Surface area: 2,054 km^{2} (793 sq mi)

Waki Dam, is an earthfill dam on a local river named Godavari near Pachora, Jalgaon district in the state of Maharashtra in India.

== Specifications ==
The height of the dam above its lowest foundation is 51.87 m (170.2 ft) while the length is 869 m (2,851 ft). The volume content is 4,582 km^{3} (1,099 cu mi) and gross storage capacity is 53,730.00 km^{3} (12,890.51 cu mi).

== Purpose ==
- Irrigation

== See also ==
- Dams in Maharashtra
- List of reservoirs and dams in India
