= Chilewadi Dam =

Dam in Maharashtra, India

Chilewadi dam
- Interactive map of Chilewadi dam
- Official name: Chilewadi dam D03145
- Location: Junnar
- Opening date: 2000
- Owners: Government of Maharashtra, India

Dam and spillways
- Type of dam: Earthfill
- Impounds: Mandvi river
- Height: 62.56 m (205.2 ft)
- Length: 440 m (1,440 ft)
- Dam volume: 36.23 km^{3} (8.69 cu mi)

Reservoir
- Total capacity: 24,610 km^{3} (5,900 cu mi)
- Surface area: 67,410 km^{2} (26,030 sq mi)

Chilewadi dam, is an earthfill dam on Mandvi river near Junnar, Pune district in the state of Maharashtra in India.

== Specifications ==
The height of the dam above lowest foundation is 62.56 m (205.2 ft) while the length is 440 m (1,440 ft). The volume content is 36.23 km^{3} (8.69 cu mi) and gross storage capacity is 27,170.00 km^{3} (6,518.43 cu mi).

== Purpose ==
- Irrigation

== See also ==
- Dams in Maharashtra
- List of reservoirs and dams in India
