= Bhivargi Dam =

- Location within Maharashtra
- Official name: Bhivargi Dam
- Location: Jath
- Coordinates: 17.086733°N 75.5810887°E
- Opening date: 2001
- Owners: Government of Maharashtra, India

Dam and spillways
- Type of dam: Earthfill
- Impounds: Patan river
- Height: 15.85 m (52.0 ft)
- Length: 1,606 m (5,269 ft)
- Dam volume: 0 km^{3} (0 cu mi)

Reservoir
- Total capacity: 8,630 km^{3} (2,070 cu mi)
- Surface area: 0 km^{2} (0 sq mi)

Bhivargi Dam, is an earthfill dam on Patan river near Jat, Sangli district in state of Maharashtra in India.

== Specifications ==
The height of the dam above lowest foundation is 15.85 m (52.0 ft) while the length is 1,606 m (5,269 ft). The volume content is 0 km^{3} (0 cu mi) and gross storage capacity is 11,200.00 km^{3} (2,687.02 cu mi).

== Purpose ==
- Irrigation

== See also ==
- Dams in Maharashtra
- List of reservoirs and dams in India
