= Bodalkasa Dam =

- Location within Maharashtra
- Official name: Bodalkasa Dam
- Location: Tiroda
- Coordinates: 21.3529582°N 80.0292206°E
- Opening date: 1917
- Operators: Government of Maharashtra, India

Dam and spillways
- Type of dam: Earthfill
- Impounds: Bhagdeogoti river
- Height: 19.2 m (63 ft)
- Length: 510 m (1,670 ft)
- Dam volume: 107.62 km^{3} (25.82 cu mi)

Reservoir
- Total capacity: .016454 km^{3} (0.003948 cu mi)
- Surface area: 6.450 km^{2} (2.490 sq mi)

Bodalkasa Dam, is an earthfill dam on Bhagdeogoti river near Tiroda, Gondia district in State of Maharashtra in India.

== Specifications ==
The height of the dam above lowest foundation is 19.2 m (63 ft) while the length is 510 m (1,670 ft). The volume content is 0.010762 km^{3} (0.002582 cu mi) and gross storage capacity is 0.017392 km^{3} (0.004173 cu mi).

== Purpose ==
- Irrigation

== Tourism ==
Bodalkasa has become a popular tourist Hotspot. It is also having maharashtra government resthouse.

== See also ==
- Dams in Maharashtra
- List of reservoirs and dams in India
