= Pandherbodi Dam =

- Location within Maharashtra
- Official name: Pandherbodi Dam
- Location: Umrer
- Coordinates: 20.8126064°N 79.2732239°E
- Opening date: 1967
- Owners: Government of Maharashtra, India

Dam and spillways
- Type of dam: Earthfill
- Impounds: local river
- Height: 15.24 m (50.0 ft)
- Length: 1,769 m (5,804 ft)
- Dam volume: 284 km^{3} (68 cu mi)

Reservoir
- Total capacity: 13,120 km^{3} (3,150 cu mi)
- Surface area: 425 km^{2} (164 sq mi)

Pandherbodi Dam, is an earthfill dam on local river near Umred, Nagpur district in the state of Maharashtra in India.

== Specifications ==
The height of the dam above lowest foundation is 15.24 m (50.0 ft) while the length is 1,769 m (5,804 ft). The volume content is 284 km^{3} (68 cu mi) and gross storage capacity is 13,860.00 km^{3} (3,325.19 cu mi).

== Purpose ==
- Irrigation

== See also ==
- Dams in Maharashtra
- List of reservoirs and dams in India
