= Upper Dudhana Dam =

- Interactive map of Upper Dudhana Dam
- Official name: Upper Dudhana Dam
- Location: Jalna
- Coordinates: 19.9210°N 75.6947°E
- Opening date: 1964
- Owners: Government of Maharashtra, India

Dam and spillways
- Type of dam: Earthfill
- Impounds: Dudhana river
- Height: 18 m (59 ft)
- Length: 2,750 m (9,020 ft)
- Dam volume: 965 km^{3} (232 cu mi)

Reservoir
- Total capacity: 13,010 km^{3} (3,120 cu mi)
- Surface area: 445 km^{2} (172 sq mi)

Upper Dudhana Dam, is an earthfill dam on Dudhana river near Jalna in the state of Maharashtra in India.

== Specifications ==
The height of the dam above its lowest foundation is 18 m (59 ft) while the length is 2,750 m (9,020 ft). The volume content is 965 km^{3} (232 cu mi) and gross storage capacity is 15,000.00 km^{3} (3,598.69 cu mi).

== Purpose ==
- Irrigation

== See also ==
- Dams in Maharashtra
- List of reservoirs and dams in India
