= Kanoli Dam =

- Location within Maharashtra
- Official name: Kanoli Dam D01259
- Location: Dhule
- Coordinates: 20.6558609°N 74.7838283°E
- Opening date: 1974
- Owners: Government of Maharashtra, India

Dam and spillways
- Type of dam: Earthfill
- Impounds: Bori river
- Height: 24.5 m (80 ft)
- Length: 459 m (1,506 ft)
- Dam volume: 290 km^{3} (70 cu mi)

Reservoir
- Total capacity: 8,450 km^{3} (2,030 cu mi)
- Surface area: 217 km^{2} (84 sq mi)

Kanoli Dam is an earthfill dam on the Bori River near Dhule, in Nashik District in the Indian state of Maharashtra.

== Specifications ==
The height of the dam above lowest foundation is 24.5 m (80 ft) while the length is 459 m (1,506 ft). The volume content is 290 km^{3} (70 cu mi) and gross storage capacity is 11,900.00 km^{3} (2,854.96 cu mi).

== Purpose ==
- Irrigation

== See also ==
- Dams in Maharashtra
- List of reservoirs and dams in India
