= Nazare Dam =

- Location within Maharashtra
- Official name: Nazare Dam D01306
- Location: Jejuri
- Coordinates: 18.2995587°N 74.1871661°E
- Opening date: 1974
- Owners: Government of Maharashtra, India

Dam and spillways
- Type of dam: Earthfill
- Impounds: Karha river
- Height: 22.54 m (74.0 ft)
- Length: 2,021 m (6,631 ft)
- Dam volume: 1,010 km^{3} (240 cu mi)

Reservoir
- Total capacity: 16,650 km^{3} (3,990 cu mi)
- Surface area: 3,890 km^{2} (1,500 sq mi)

Nazare Dam, also called Malharsagar, is an earthfill dam on Karha river near Jejuri, Pune district in the state of Maharashtra in India.

== Specifications ==
The height of the dam above lowest foundation is 22.54 m (74.0 ft) while the length is 2,021 m (6,631 ft). The volume content is 1,010,000 m^{3} (36,000,000 cu ft) and gross storage capacity is 22,316,000 m^{3} (788,100,000 cu ft).

== See also ==
- Dams in Maharashtra
- List of reservoirs and dams in India
