= Chulbandh Dam =

Dam in Gondia, Maharashtra, India

- Location within Maharashtra
- Official name: Chulbandh Dam
- Location: Gondia
- Coordinates: 21.2288407°N 80.2235413°E
- Opening date: 1974
- Owners: Government of Maharashtra, India

Dam and spillways
- Type of dam: Earthfill
- Impounds: Chulbandh river
- Height: 22.08 m (72.4 ft)
- Length: 465 m (1,526 ft)
- Dam volume: 130 km^{3} (31 cu mi)

Reservoir
- Total capacity: 16,540 km^{3} (3,970 cu mi)
- Surface area: 3,750 km^{2} (1,450 sq mi)

Chulbandh Dam, is an earthfill dam on Chulbandh river near Goregaon, Gondia district in state of Maharashtra in India.

== Specifications ==
The height of the dam above lowest foundation is 22.08 m (72.4 ft) while the length is 465 m (1,526 ft). The volume content is 130 km^{3} (31 cu mi) and gross storage capacity is 21,458.00 km^{3} (5,148.05 cu mi).

== Purpose ==
- Irrigation

== See also ==
- Dams in Maharashtra
- List of reservoirs and dams in India
