= Mahamadwadi Dam =

Mahamadwadi dam
- Location within Maharashtra
- Official name: Mahamadwadi dam
- Coordinates: 16.2035764°N 73.8847705°E
- Owners: Government of Maharashtra, India

Dam and spillways
- Type of dam: Earthfill
- Impounds: Gad river
- Height: 59.33 m (194.7 ft)
- Length: 1,590 m (5,220 ft)
- Dam volume: 12,000 km^{3} (2,900 cu mi)

Reservoir
- Total capacity: 91,399 km^{3} (21,928 cu mi)
- Surface area: 4,243 km^{2} (1,638 sq mi)

Mahamadwadi Dam, (or Mohamod Wadi Dam) is an earthfill dam on Gad river near Nardave in Kankavli taluka of Sindhudurg district, in the state of Maharashtra in India.

== Specifications ==
The height of the dam above lowest foundation is 59.33 m (194.7 ft) while the length is 1,590 m (5,220 ft). The volume content is 12,000 km^{3} (2,900 cu mi) and gross storage capacity is 93,374.00 km^{3} (22,401.61 cu mi).

== Purpose ==
- Irrigation
- Hydroelectricity

== See also ==
- Dams in Maharashtra
- List of reservoirs and dams in India
