= Dongargaon Dam =

- Location within Maharashtra
- Official name: Dongargaon Dam D03049
- Location: Rajura
- Coordinates: 19.5947255°N 79.4009399°E
- Opening date: 2000
- Owners: Government of Maharashtra, India

Dam and spillways
- Type of dam: Earthfill
- Impounds: local river
- Height: 23 m (75 ft)
- Length: 572 m (1,877 ft)
- Dam volume: 285 km^{3} (68 cu mi)

Reservoir
- Total capacity: 12,440 km^{3} (2,980 cu mi)
- Surface area: 3,757 km^{2} (1,451 sq mi)

Dongargaon Dam is an earthfill dam on a local river near Rajura, Chandrapur district in the state of Maharashtra in India.

== Specifications ==
The height of the dam above the lowest foundation is 23 m (75 ft) while the length is 572 m (1,877 ft). The volume content is 285 km^{3} (68 cu mi) and gross storage capacity is 14,180.00 km^{3} (3,401.96 cu mi).

== Purpose ==
- Irrigation

== See also ==
- Dams in Maharashtra
- List of reservoirs and dams in India
