= Chandani Dam =

- Location within Maharashtra
- Official name: Chandani Dam D01203
- Location: Paranda
- Coordinates: 18.2543152°N 75.5327386°E
- Opening date: 1965
- Owners: Government of Maharashtra, India

Dam and spillways
- Type of dam: Earthfill
- Impounds: Chandani river
- Height: 17.18 m (56.4 ft)
- Length: 1,920 m (6,300 ft)
- Dam volume: 289 km^{3} (69 cu mi)

Reservoir
- Total capacity: 15,220 km^{3} (3,650 cu mi)
- Surface area: 813 km^{2} (314 sq mi)

Chandani Dam, is an earthfill dam on Chandani river near Paranda, Osmanabad district in the state of Maharashtra in India.

== Specifications ==
The height of the dam above lowest foundation is 17.18 m (56.4 ft) while the length is 1,920 m (6,300 ft). The volume content is 289 km^{3} (69 cu mi) and gross storage capacity is 20,700.00 km^{3} (4,966.19 cu mi).

== Purpose ==
- Irrigation

== See also ==
- Dams in Maharashtra
- List of reservoirs and dams in India
