= Harni Dam =

- Location within Maharashtra
- Official name: Harni Dam D01211
- Location: Tuljapur
- Coordinates: 17.8298316°N 76.0986579°E
- Opening date: 1965
- Owners: Government of Maharashtra, India

Dam and spillways
- Type of dam: Earthfill
- Impounds: local river
- Height: 16.55 m (54.3 ft)
- Length: 3,059 m (10,036 ft)

Reservoir
- Total capacity: 11,180 km^{3} (2,680 cu mi)
- Surface area: 317 km^{2} (122 sq mi)

Harni Dam, is an earthfill dam on local river near Tuljapur, Osmanabad district in the state of Maharashtra in India.

== Specifications ==
The height of the dam above lowest foundation is 16.55 m (54.3 ft) while the length is 3,059 m (10,036 ft). The gross storage capacity is 13,580.00 km^{3} (3,258.02 cu mi).

== Purpose ==
- Irrigation

== See also ==
- Dams in Maharashtra
- List of reservoirs and dams in India
