= Purnaneopur Dam =

- Location within Maharashtra
- Official name: Purnaneopur Dam D03045
- Location: Kannad
- Coordinates: 20.3873136°N 75.3191542°E
- Opening date: 1998
- Owners: Government of Maharashtra, India

Dam and spillways
- Type of dam: Earthfill
- Impounds: Purna river
- Height: 16.6 m (54 ft)
- Length: 2,725 m (8,940 ft)
- Dam volume: 506 km^{3} (121 cu mi)

Reservoir
- Total capacity: 9,340 km^{3} (2,240 cu mi)
- Surface area: 3,848 km^{2} (1,486 sq mi)

near Kannad, Aurangabad district in the state of Maharashtra in India.

== Specifications ==
The height of the dam above lowest foundation is 16.6 m (54 ft) while the length is 2,725 m (8,940 ft). The volume content is 506 km^{3} (121 cu mi) and gross storage capacity is 11,380.00 km^{3} (2,730.21 cu mi).

== Purpose ==
- Irrigation

== See also ==
- Dams in Maharashtra
- List of reservoirs and dams in India
