= Nagan Dam =

- Location within Maharashtra
- Official name: Nagan Dam D03102
- Location: Navapur
- Coordinates: 21.2056927°N 73.9750073°E
- Demolition date: N/A
- Owners: Government of Maharashtra, India

Dam and spillways
- Type of dam: Earthfill
- Impounds: Nagan river
- Height: 29.24 m (95.9 ft)
- Length: 2,940 m (9,650 ft)
- Dam volume: 1,800 km^{3} (430 cu mi)

Reservoir
- Total capacity: 22,760 km^{3} (5,460 cu mi)
- Surface area: 3,334 km^{2} (1,287 sq mi)

Nagan Dam, is an earthfill dam on Nagan river near Navapur, Nandurbar district in the state of Maharashtra in India.

== Specifications ==
The height of the dam above lowest foundation is 29.24 m (95.9 ft) while the length is 2,940 m (9,650 ft). The volume content is 1,800 km^{3} (430 cu mi) and gross storage capacity is 25,150.00 km^{3} (6,033.81 cu mi). It is built by Unity Multicons Pvt Ltd Solapur

== Purpose ==
- Irrigation

== See also ==
- Dams in Maharashtra
- List of reservoirs and dams in India
