= Malangaon Dam =

- Location within Maharashtra
- Official name: Malangaon Dam D01249
- Location: Sakri
- Coordinates: 21.0865919°N 74.0953051°E
- Construction began: 1970
- Opening date: 1987
- Owners: Government of Maharashtra, India

Dam and spillways
- Type of dam: Earthfill
- Impounds: Kan River
- Height: 23.78 m (78.0 ft)
- Length: 1,141 m (3,743 ft)
- Dam volume: 500 km^{3} (120 cu mi)

Reservoir
- Total capacity: 11,325 km^{3} (2,717 cu mi)
- Surface area: 248 km^{2} (96 sq mi)

Malangaon Dam is an earthfill dam on the Kan River near Sakri, Dhule district, in the state of Maharashtra in India. It is used for irrigation.

== Specifications ==
The height of the dam above its lowest foundation is 23.78 m (78.0 ft) while its length is 1,141 m (3,743 ft). Its volume is 500 km^{3} (120 cu mi) and its gross storage capacity is 13,023.00 km^{3} (3,124.38 cu mi).

== See also ==
- Dams in Maharashtra
- List of reservoirs and dams in India
