= Katepurna Dam =

- Location within Maharashtra
- Official name: Katepurna Dam D01237
- Location: Akola, Maharashtra
- Coordinates: 20.4801831°N 77.1568107°E
- Construction began: 1974
- Opening date: 1974
- Owner: Government of Maharashtra

Dam and spillways
- Type of dam: Earthfill
- Impounds: Katepurna river
- Height: 29.5 m (97 ft)
- Length: 2,000 m (6,600 ft)
- Dam volume: 693,000 m^{3} (24,500,000 cu ft)

Reservoir
- Total capacity: 86,350,000 m^{3} (3.049×10^{9} cu ft)
- Surface area: 12.430 km^{2} (4.799 sq mi)

The Katepurna Dam is an earthfill dam on the Katepurna River situated at Mahan, near Barshi Takali, Akola district, in the state of Maharashtra in India. It serves the city of Akola and the surrounding suburbs.it provides water to over 800,000 citizens of Akola and 69 surrounding villages.

== Specifications ==
The height of the dam above its lowest foundation is 29.5 m (97 ft), while the length is 2,000 m (6,600 ft). Its volume is 693,000 m^{3} (24,500,000 cu ft), and its gross storage capacity is 97,670,000 m^{3} (3.449×10^{9} cu ft).

== Purpose ==
- Irrigation
- Water Supply

== See also ==
- Dams in Maharashtra
- List of reservoirs and dams in India
