= Bor Dahegaon Dam =

- Location within Maharashtra
- Official name: Bor Dahegaon Dam D03074
- Location: Vaijapur
- Coordinates: 19.9365569°N 74.8856797°E
- Construction began: 1995
- Opening date: 1998
- Owners: Government of Maharashtra, India

Dam and spillways
- Type of dam: Earthfill
- Impounds: bor river
- Height: 16.7 m (55 ft)
- Length: 7 km (4.3 mi)
- Dam volume: 2TMC 0 km^{3} (0 cu mi)

Reservoir
- Total capacity: 0 km^{3} (0 cu mi)
- Surface area: 0 km^{2} (0 sq mi)

Power Station
- Installed capacity: 2TMC

Bor Dahegaon Dam, is an earthfill dam on local river near Vaijapur, Aurangabad district in state of Maharashtra in India.

== Specifications ==
The height of the dam above lowest foundation is 16.7 m (55 ft) while the length is 0 m (0 ft). The volume content is 0 km^{3} (0 cu mi) and gross storage capacity is 0.013400 km^{3} (0.003215 cu mi).

== Purpose ==
- Irrigation

== See also ==
- Dams in Maharashtra
- List of reservoirs and dams in India
