= Dhamna Dam =

- Location within Maharashtra
- Official name: Dhamna Dam D01322
- Location: Bhokardan
- Coordinates: 20.447079°N 75.8836466°E
- Opening date: 1974
- Owners: Government of Maharashtra, India

Dam and spillways
- Type of dam: Earthfill
- Impounds: raighol river
- Height: 13 m (43 ft)
- Length: 2,560 m (8,400 ft)
- Dam volume: 443 km^{3} (106 cu mi)

Reservoir
- Total capacity: 8,490 km^{3} (2,040 cu mi)
- Surface area: 433 km^{2} (167 sq mi)

Dhamna Dam, is an earthfill dam on local river near Bhokardan, Jalna district in state of Maharashtra in India.

== Specifications ==
The height of the dam above lowest foundation is 13 m (43 ft) while the length is 2,560 m (8,400 ft). The volume content is 443 km^{3} (106 cu mi) and gross storage capacity is 10,730.00 km^{3} (2,574.26 cu mi).

== Purpose ==
- Irrigation

== See also ==
- Dams in Maharashtra
- List of reservoirs and dams in India
