= Vihar Dam =

Vihar dam
- Location within Mumbai
- Official name: Vihar dam D04998
- Location: Mumbai
- Coordinates: 19.1514482°N 72.910552°E
- Opening date: 1860
- Owners: Government of Maharashtra, India

Dam and spillways
- Type of dam: Earthfill
- Impounds: Vihar river
- Height: 25.6 m (84 ft)
- Length: 817 m (2,680 ft)
- Dam volume: 353 km^{3} (85 cu mi)

Reservoir
- Total capacity: 41,410 km^{3} (9,930 cu mi)
- Surface area: 7,270 km^{2} (2,810 sq mi)

Vihar dam, is an earthfill dam on Vihar river in Mumbai, near Bhandup in the state of Maharashtra in India.

== Specifications ==
The height of the dam above its lowest foundation is 25.6 m (84 ft) while the length is 817 m (2,680 ft). The volume content is 353 km^{3} (85 cu mi) and gross storage capacity is 41,459.00 km^{3} (9,946.54 cu mi).

== Purpose ==
- Drinking water
- Water Supply
- hydroelectric power

== See also ==
- Dams in Maharashtra
- List of reservoirs and dams in India
