= Dham Dam =

- Location within Maharashtra
- Official name: Dham Dam D02889
- Location: Arvi
- Coordinates: 20.9601572°N 78.4492493°E
- Opening date: 1986
- Owners: Government of Maharashtra, India

Dam and spillways
- Type of dam: Earthfill
- Impounds: Dham river
- Height: 33.35 m (109.4 ft)
- Length: 1,728 m (5,669 ft)
- Dam volume: 2,737 km^{3} (657 cu mi)

Reservoir
- Total capacity: 62,510 km^{3} (15,000 cu mi)
- Surface area: 7,780 km^{2} (3,000 sq mi)

Dham Dam, is an earthfill dam on Dham river near Arvi, Wardha district in state of Maharashtra in India.

== Specifications ==
The reservoir shape resembles the shape of an imaginary dragon or a peacock shape in bird's eye view. It is a spillway type dam without the gates. The height of the dam above lowest foundation is 33.35 m (109.4 ft) while the length is 1,728 m (5,669 ft). The volume content is 2,737 km^{3} (657 cu mi) and gross storage capacity is 72,460.00 km^{3} (17,384.08 cu mi).

== Purpose ==
- Irrigation

== See also ==
- Dams in Maharashtra
- List of reservoirs and dams in India
