= Mehakari Dam =

- Location within Maharashtra
- Official name: Mehakari Dam D01214
- Location: Ashti
- Coordinates: 18.8671529°N 75.0028455°E
- Opening date: 1966
- Owners: Government of Maharashtra, India

Dam and spillways
- Type of dam: Earthfill
- Impounds: Mehakari river
- Height: 27.63 m (90.6 ft)
- Length: 1,308 m (4,291 ft)
- Dam volume: 163.5 km^{3} (39.2 cu mi)

Reservoir
- Total capacity: 13,000 km^{3} (3,100 cu mi)
- Surface area: 38 km^{2} (15 sq mi)

Mehakari Dam, (also called as Mekhari dam) is an earthfill dam on Mehakari River near Ashti, Beed district in the state of Maharashtra in India.

== Specifications ==
The height of the dam above lowest foundation is 27.63 m (90.6 ft) while the length is 1,308 m (4,291 ft). The volume content is 163.5 km^{3} (39.2 cu mi) and gross storage capacity is 16,130.00 km^{3} (3,869.79 cu mi).

== Purpose ==
- Irrigation

== See also ==
- Dams in Maharashtra
- List of reservoirs and dams in India
