= Ghodazari Dam =

- Location within Maharashtra
- Official name: घोडाझरी धरण
- Location: Nagbhid
- Coordinates: 20.5398383°N 79.6343994°E
- Opening date: 1923
- Owners: Government of Maharashtra, India

Dam and spillways
- Type of dam: Earthfill
- Impounds: Ghodazari river
- Height: 23.55 m (77.3 ft)
- Length: 731.7 m (2,401 ft)
- Dam volume: 90 km^{3} (22 cu mi)

Reservoir
- Total capacity: 38,000 km^{3} (9,100 cu mi)
- Surface area: 976 km^{2} (377 sq mi)

Ghodazari Dam (Marathi: घोडाझरी धरण) is an earthfill dam on Gorazari river near Nagbhid in Chandrapur district of the state of Maharashtra in India.

== Specifications ==
The height of the dam above lowest foundation is 23.55 m (77.3 ft) while the length is 731.7 m (2,401 ft). The volume content is 90 km^{3} (22 cu mi) and gross storage capacity is 45,080.00 km^{3} (10,815.27 cu mi).

== Purpose ==
- Irrigation - Located in Nagbhid Tehsil in the Chandrapur District, the dam irrigates land in Nagbhid and Sindewahi Tehsil, especially the Talodhi and Nawargaon region.
- Tourism - The dam is located in the centre of a dense forest, but is easily accessible by road. The surrounding jungle is full of flora and fauna. The beauty of the area is complemented by the "British era" resthouse and the small garden near the dam. In recent years the dam has become a notable location in the Chandrapur District because of the availability of a boating facility and srestaurants.

== See also ==
- Dams in Maharashtra
- List of reservoirs and dams in India
