= Borna Dam =

- Location within Maharashtra
- Official name: Borna Dam D01393
- Location: Ambejogai
- Coordinates: 18.8521844°N 76.5933009°E
- Opening date: 1983
- Owners: Government of Maharashtra, India

Dam and spillways
- Type of dam: Earthfill
- Impounds: Borna river
- Height: 22.3 m (73 ft)
- Length: 866 m (2,841 ft)
- Dam volume: 460 km^{3} (110 cu mi)

Reservoir
- Total capacity: 9,060 km^{3} (2,170 cu mi)
- Surface area: 2,191 km^{2} (846 sq mi)

Borna Dam, is an earthfill dam on Borna river near Ambejogai, Beed district in state of Maharashtra in India.

== Specifications ==
The height of the dam above lowest foundation is 22.3 m (73 ft) while the length is 866 m (2,841 ft). The volume content is 460 km^{3} (110 cu mi) and gross storage capacity is 10,908.00 km^{3} (2,616.97 cu mi).

== Purpose ==
- Irrigation

== See also ==
- Dams in Maharashtra
- List of reservoirs and dams in India
