= Khekaranalla Dam =

- Location within Maharashtra
- Official name: Khekaranalla Dam D05112
- Location: Kalmeshwar
- Coordinates: 21.5415074°N 78.9500845°E
- Opening date: 1988
- Owners: Government of Maharashtra, India

Dam and spillways
- Type of dam: Earthfill
- Impounds: KhekaraNalla river
- Height: 24.5 m (80 ft)
- Length: 330 m (1,080 ft)
- Dam volume: 306,000 m^{3} (10,800,000 cu ft)

Reservoir
- Total capacity: 23,810,000 m^{3} (841,000,000 cu ft)
- Surface area: 5,566,000 m^{2} (59,910,000 sq ft)

Khekaranalla Dam is an earthfill dam on KhekaraNalla river near Saoner, Nagpur district in state of Maharashtra in India.

== Specifications ==
The height of the dam above lowest foundation is 24.5 m (80 ft) while the length is 330 m (1,080 ft). The volume content is 306,000 m^{3} (10,800,000 cu ft) and gross storage capacity is 26,325,000 m^{3} (929,700,000 cu ft). Irrigation is the purpose of the dam.

== See also ==
- Dams in Maharashtra
- List of reservoirs and dams in India
