= Morana Dam =

Morana (Gureghar) Dam
- Location within Maharashtra
- Official name: Morana (Gureghar) Dam
- Location: Patan
- Coordinates: 17.2916632°N 73.834884°E
- Opening date: 2006
- Owners: Government of Maharashtra, India

Dam and spillways
- Type of dam: Earthfill
- Impounds: Morana river
- Height: 47.02 m (154.3 ft)
- Length: 420 m (1,380 ft)

Reservoir
- Total capacity: 36,990 km^{3} (8,870 cu mi)
- Surface area: 31.27 km^{2} (12.07 sq mi)

Morana (Gureghar) Dam, is an earthfill dam on Morana river near Patan, Satara district in the state of Maharashtra in India.

== Specifications ==
The height of the dam above lowest foundation is 47.02 m (154.3 ft) while the length is 420 m (1,380 ft). The gross storage capacity is 39,550.00 km^{3} (9,488.55 cu mi).

== Purpose ==
- Irrigation

== See also ==
- Dams in Maharashtra
- List of reservoirs and dams in India
