= Damsal Dam =

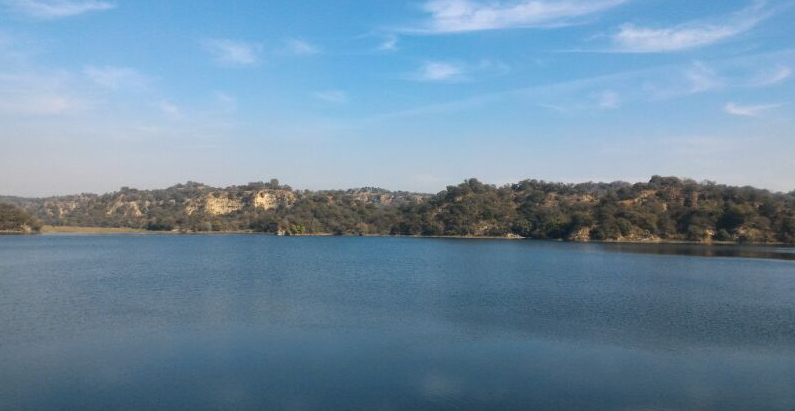

- Location within Punjab
- Official name: Damsal Dam
- Country: India
- Location: Mehingrowal, Hoshiarpur, Punjab
- Coordinates: 31.67°N 75.95°E
- Status: Operational
- Opening date: 2001
- Owners: Kandi Area Dam Maintenance Division, Punjab

Dam and spillways
- Type of dam: Embankment, earth-fill
- Impounds: Damsal River
- Height: 26 m (85 ft)
- Length: 160 m (525 ft)
- Width (crest): 6 m (20 ft)
- Width (base): 180 m (591 ft)

Reservoir
- Normal elevation: 527.9 m (1,732 ft)

Damsal Dam is an earth-fill dam in Mehingrowal of Hoshiarpur district, northern India. It is on the seasonal Damsal River and primarily serves for flood control and irrigation in the area. The dam is maintained by Kandi Area Dam Maintenance Division, Hoshiarpur.

The dam and reservoir are also called the Mehingrowal watershed and is situated about 20 km from Hoshiarpur town. It had construction cost of Rs. 1203.88 lacs; with a height 26.5 m (87 ft). It provides irrigation to 1,920 ha (4,700 acres) and has saved 2,400 ha (5,900 acres) of land from floods.
