= Barvi Dam =

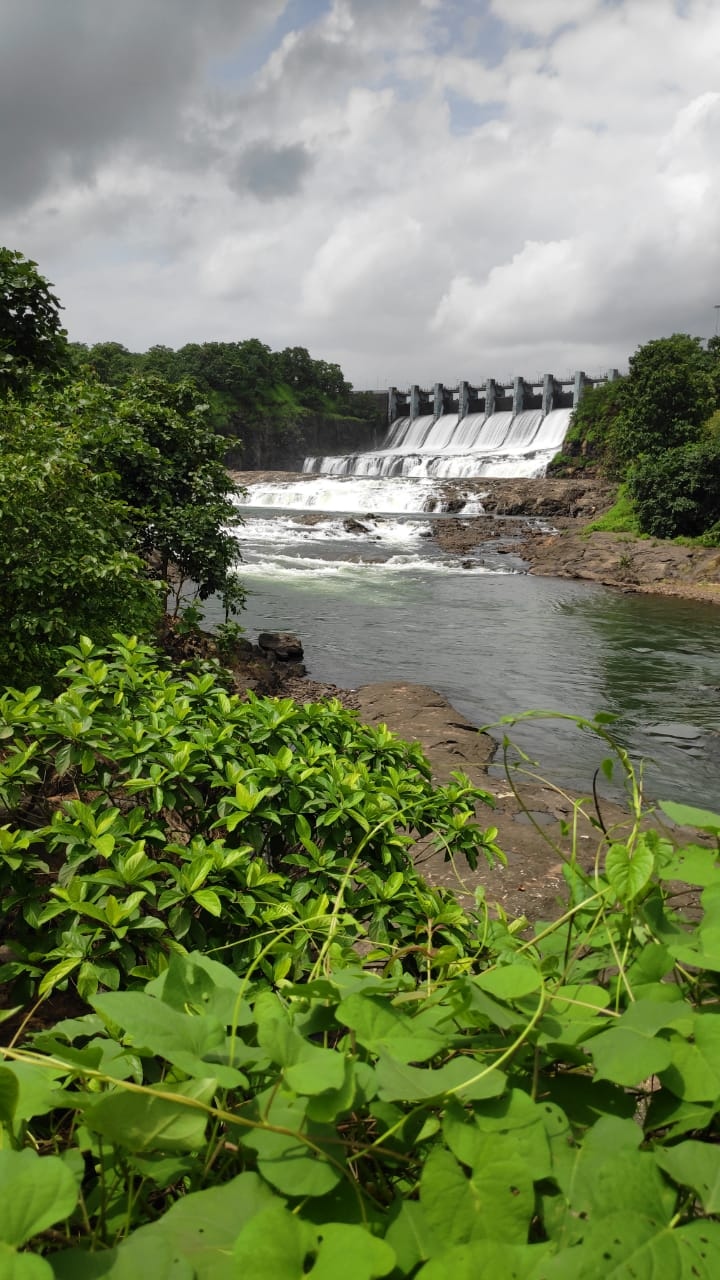
- View of Barvi Dam

- Location within Maharashtra
- Official name: Barvi Dam
- Location: Thane, Badlapur
- Coordinates: 19.1927152°N 73.3396625°E
- Opening date: 1978
- Owners: Government of Maharashtra, India

Dam and spillways
- Type of dam: Earthfill
- Impounds: Barvi river
- Height: 72.6 m (238 ft)
- Length: 746 m (2,448 ft)
- Spillway capacity: 1585m³/sec

Reservoir
- Total capacity: 341,000 km^{3} (82,000 cu mi)
- Surface area: 0.04 km^{2} (0.015 sq mi)

Barvi Dam is an earthfill dam on the Barvi River near Badlapur, Thane district, in the state of Maharashtra in India.

== Specifications ==
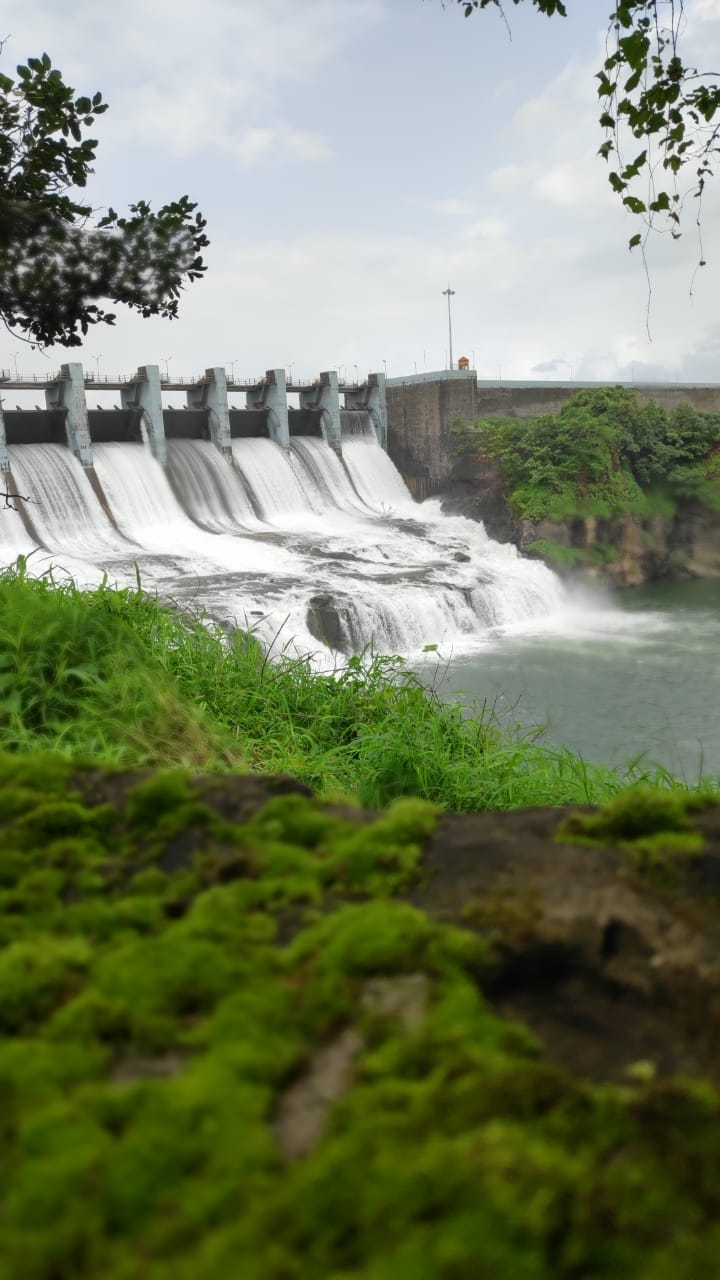
Barvi Dam lies in Badlapur

The height of the dam above lowest foundation is 48.78 m (160.0 ft) while the length is 746 m (2,448 ft) with a spillway capacity of 1585 m³/s. The live storage capacity of the dam is 176.94 Mcm(million cubic meters) The dam is primarily used for drinking water needs of Thane district and Navi Mumbai.
