= Mongra Barrage =

Dam in Chhattisgarh, India

Built across the river Shivnath in the state of Chhattisgarh, the project of Mongra Barrage includes construction of concrete barrage helping in diverging water. The project also involves installation of 10 Radial Gates. It has a length of 182.025 M along with storage capacity of 40.15 Mcumec. Materials in construction is supplied by Anandsheel Hydraulics. The electric hoist work of 15 ton was awarded to Agro Engineers by Soma Enterprises, Pune. The construction of the barrage caused major displacement of the local villagers. Promised compensation from the government, only few of them received it. According to local villagers, there are many people who got compensation even without their names in the list of affected people, but those who were really affected are still waiting for their turn. The residents of nearby villages of Mongra Barrage complained that even after dryness of the river, authorities do not release the water from barrage. Illegal mining has not stopped even after various complaints from the villagers. According to the villagers, they keep on taking rounds of government offices but no response to their complaint is provided.
