= Sangam Barrage =

Barrage across Penna river in AP, India

Sangam Barrage or Sangam Anicut was constructed across Penna River during 1882–1886 with the thought of supplying water to the canals of Nellore, Kanupur, Kavali and Kanigiri. This barrage is the main source of irrigation of about 3.85 lakh acres of land. Each year the water level is increased by 0.90 meters for providing commandability to the increasing demand of the canals of Kanupur and Kavali canals.

From many years the practice of placing sand bags over the barrage has been resulting in wastage of lakhs of rupees for government every year. The barrage needed a new construction which is in progress from about 8 years. The work had to be completed by October 2017. The deadline of the work was extended till March 2019.

In January 2021, Government officials told that major civil works of the barrage are complete and work was going on at a brisk pace. The work of the Sangam barrage will be completed by March and will be inaugurated in the month of April 2021. On 8 March 2022, Chief Minister YS Jagan told that all the pending work of the barrage will be completed within two weeks. This statement was given after the questions raised on the slow pace of work. It will be named after late Mekapati Goutham Reddy, former minister of Andhra Pradesh, said CM YS Jagan in the same press meet.
