= List of tourist attractions in Mumbai =

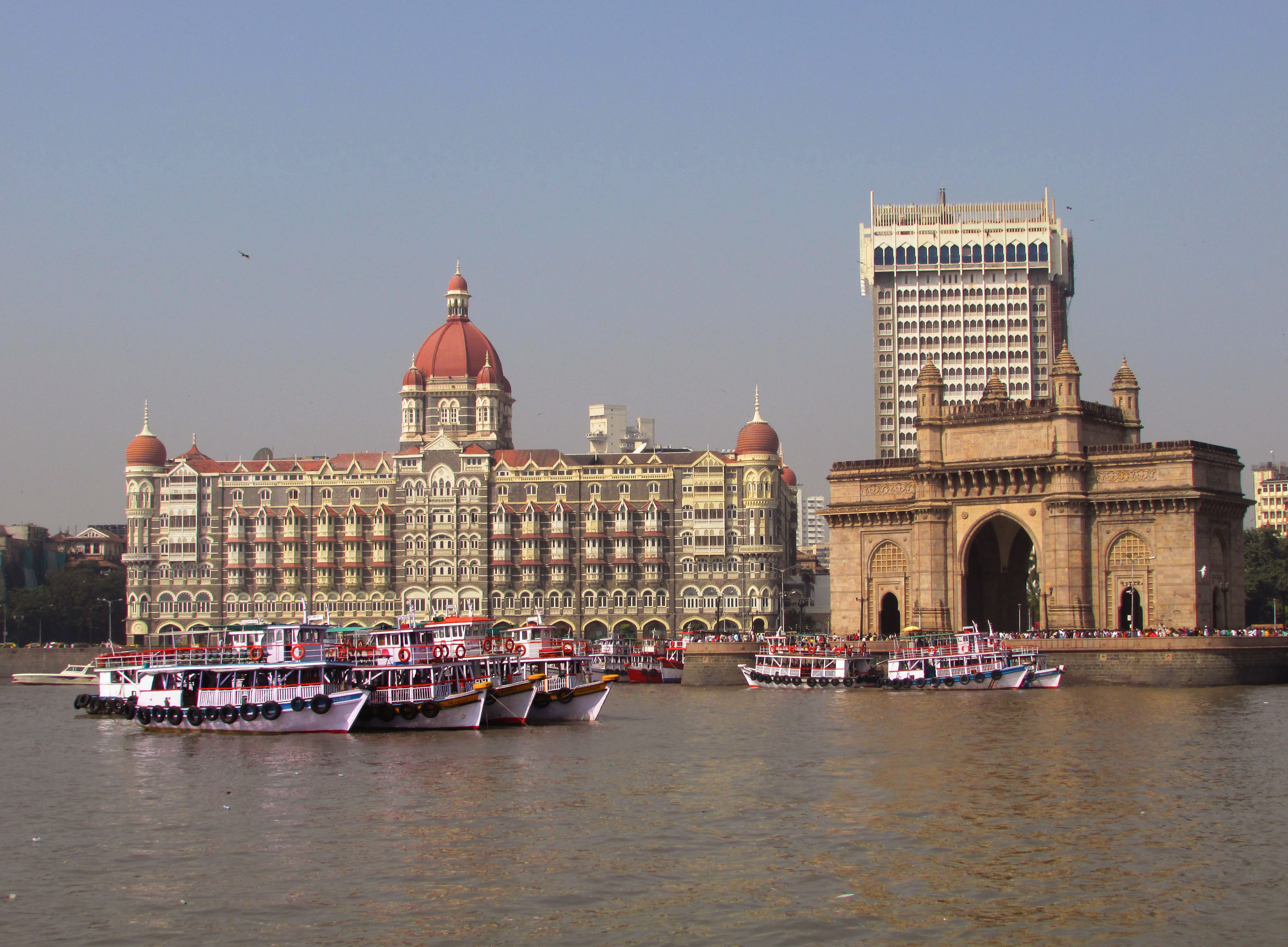
Gateway of India and Taj Mahal Palace Hotel, Apollo Bunder.

Mumbai, India has centuries of history and many sites of tourist interest.

== Archaeological sites ==
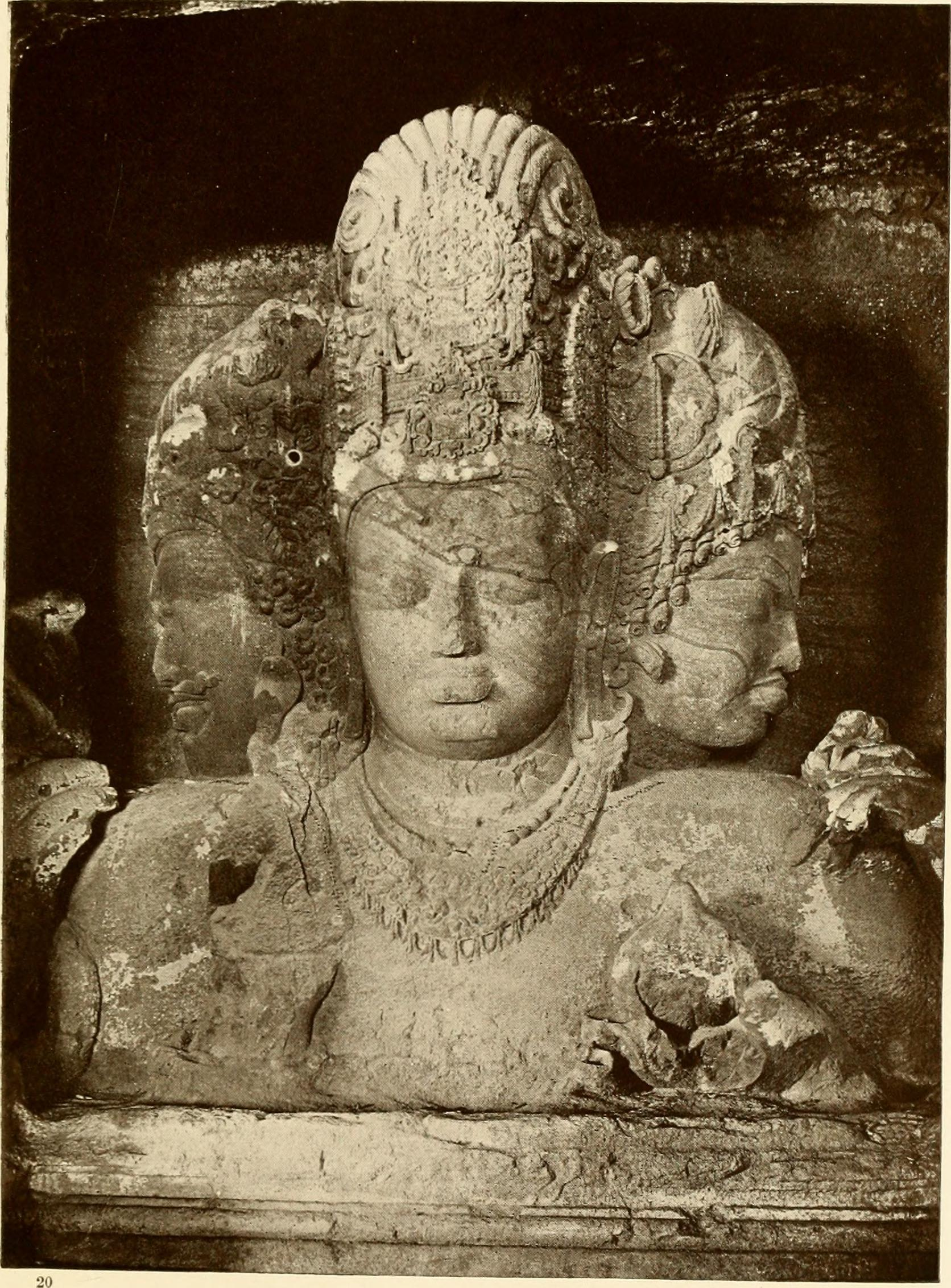
A 1913 image of the Trimurti located at the Elephanta Caves, a UNESCO heritage site

=== Caves ===
- Elephanta Caves
- Jogeshwari Caves
- Kanheri Caves
- Mahakali Caves
- Mandapeshwar Caves

=== Forts ===
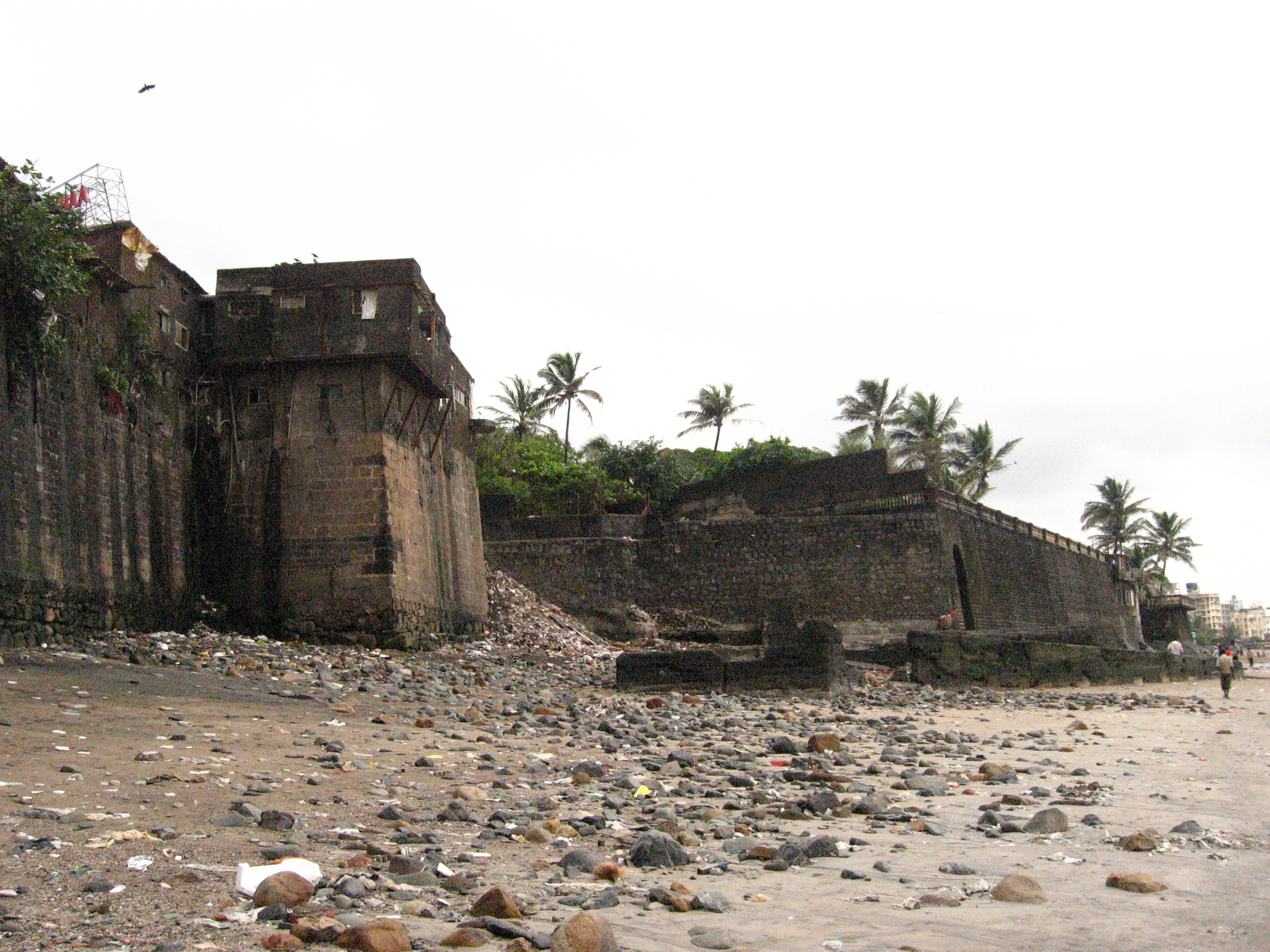
Mahim Fort

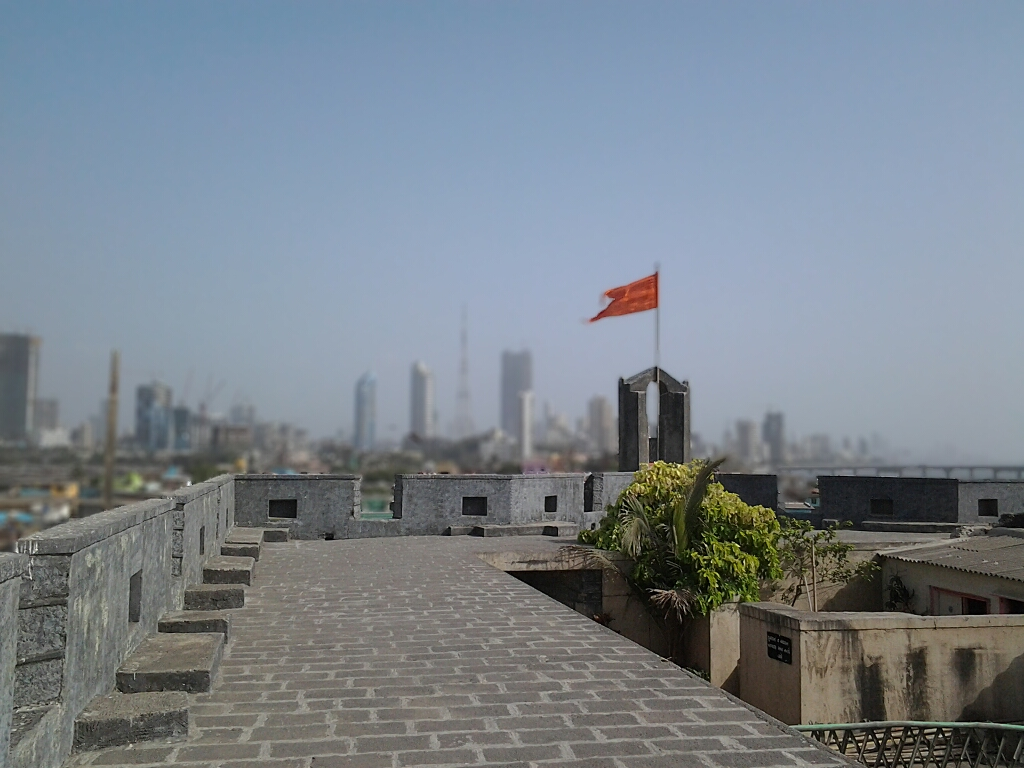
Worli Fort

- Bandra Fort (Castella de Aguada)
- Belapur Fort
- Bombay Castle
- Dongri Fort
- Fort George, Bombay
- Ghodbunder Fort
- Madh Fort
- Mahim Fort
- Mazagon Fort
- Riwa Fort
- Sewri Fort
- Sion Hillock Fort
- Vasai Fort
- Worli Fort

== Museums ==
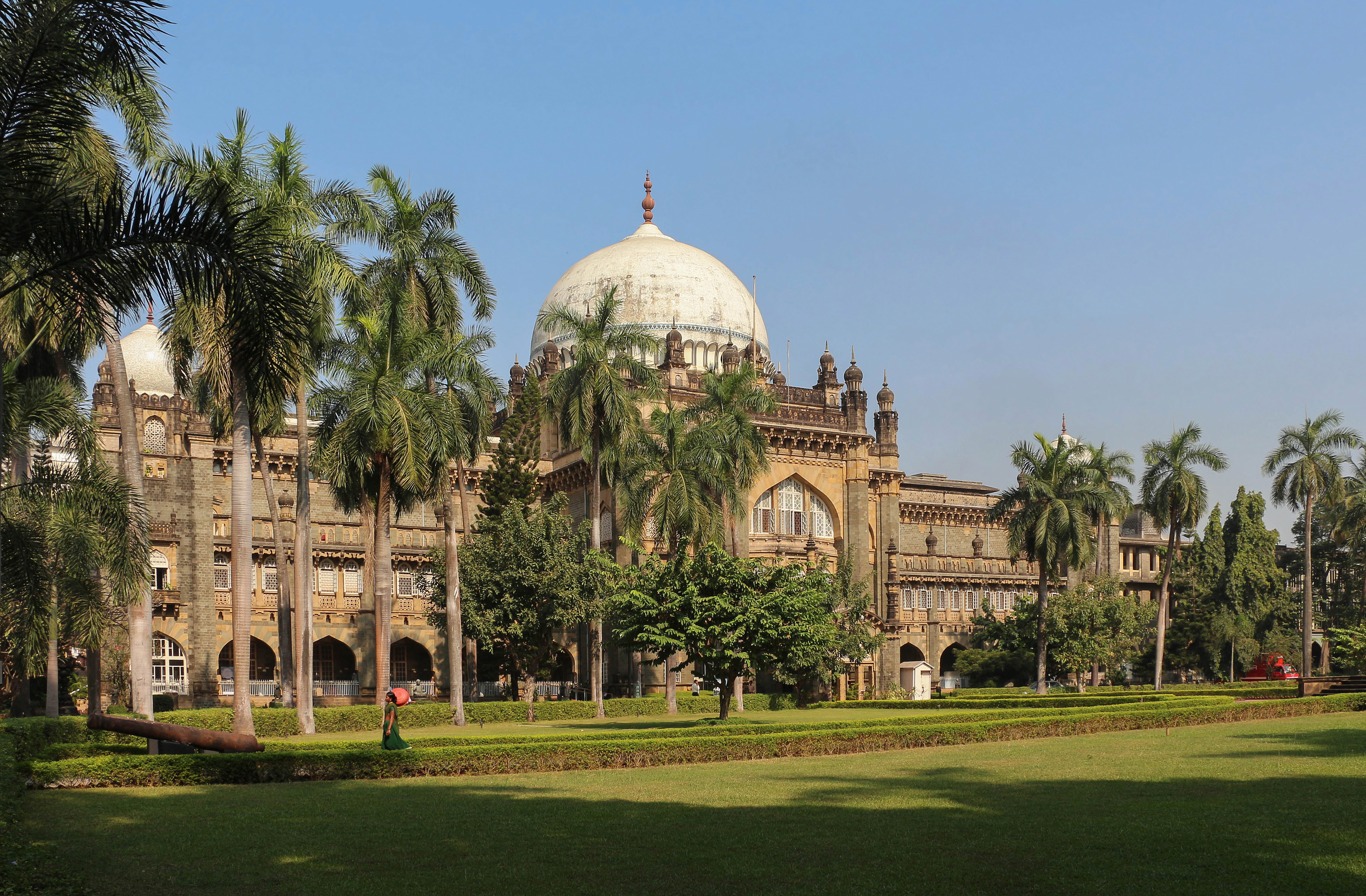
Chhatrapati Shivaji Maharaj Vastu Sangrahalaya (formerly Prince of Wales Museum of Western India)

- Antarang – Sex Health Information Art Gallery
- Chhatrapati Shivaji Maharaj Vastu Sangrahalaya
- Cowasji Jehangir Hall
- Dr. Bhau Daji Lad Museum
- Mani Bhavan
- National Gallery of Modern Art
- National Museum of Indian Cinema
- Nehru Science Centre

== Beaches ==
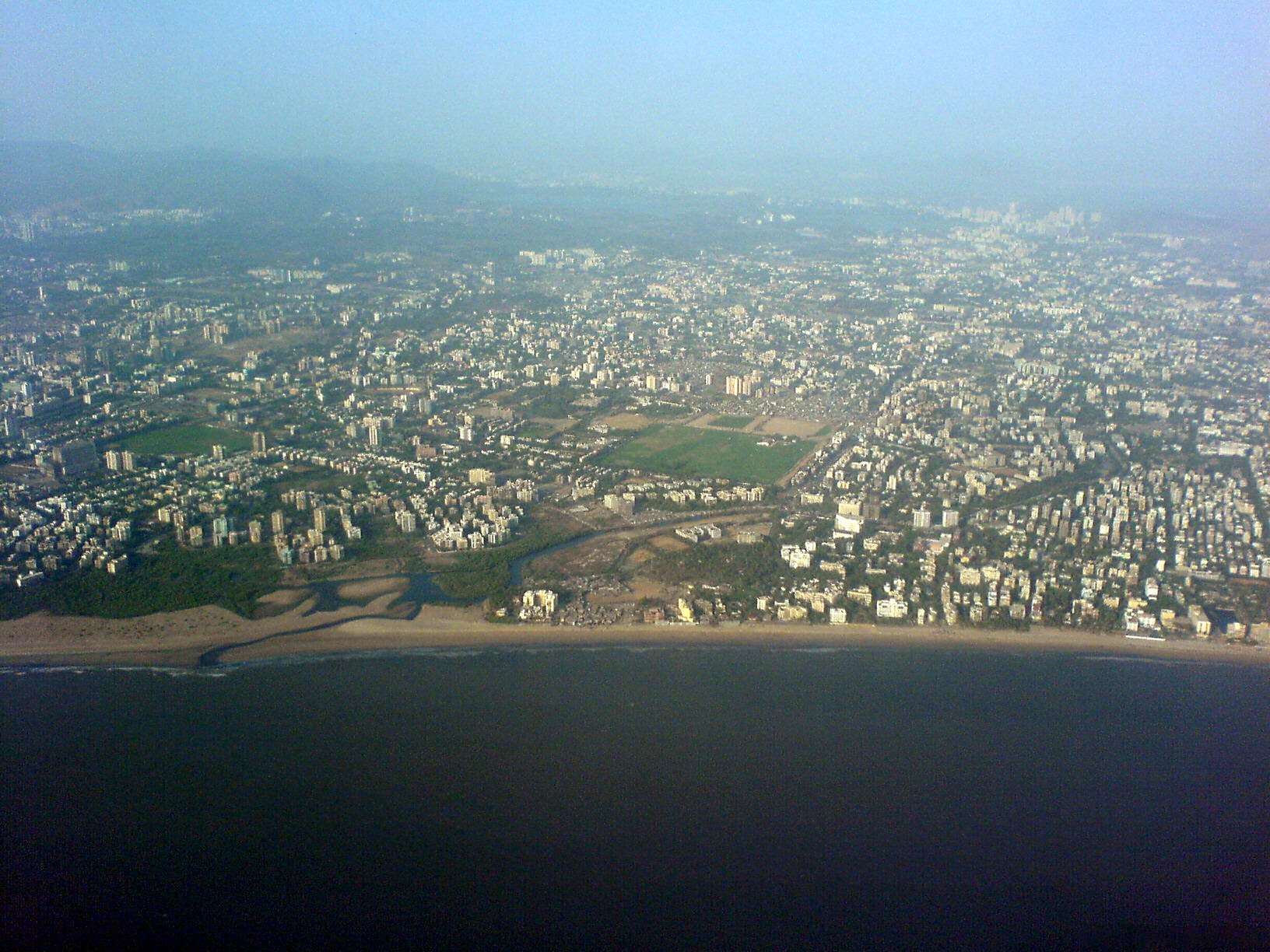
Aerial view of Juhu beach

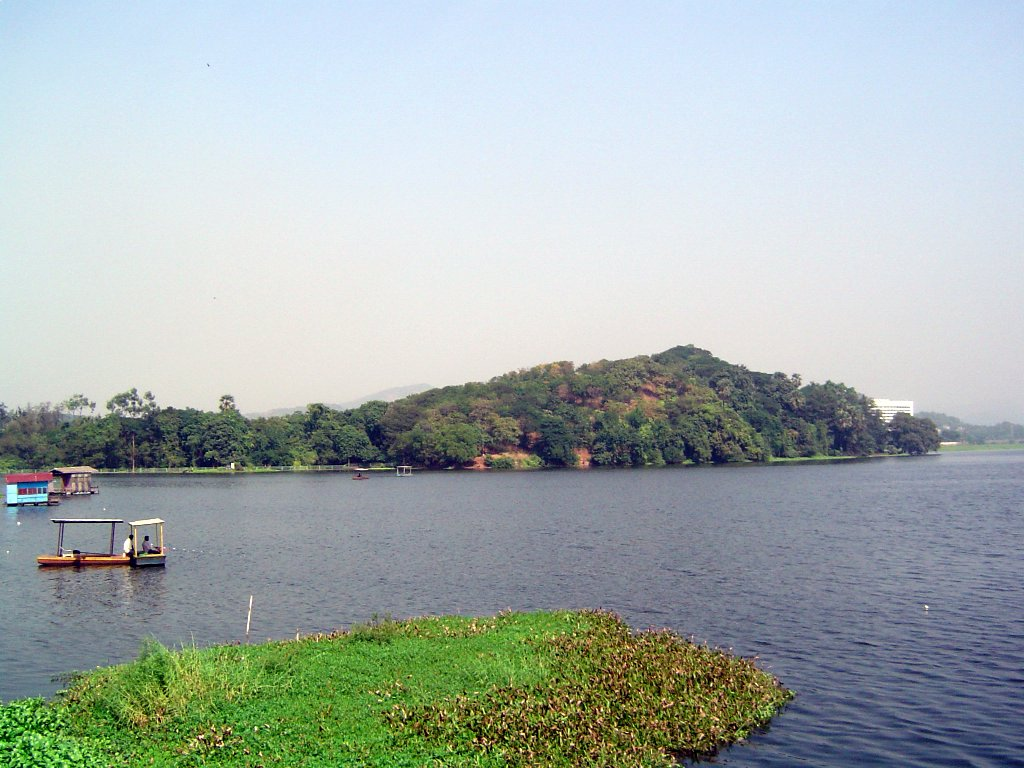
Powai Lake

- Aksa Beach
- Girgaon Chowpatty
- Juhu Beach
- Kalamb Beach
- Marvé Beach
- Versova Beach

== Ecotourist sites ==
=== Protected areas and others ===
- Karnala Bird Sanctuary
- Panje-Dongri wetlands
- Sanjay Gandhi National Park
- Thane Creek Flamingo Sanctuary
- Turtle Mass Nesting Site, Versova Beach

=== Dams and lakes ===
- Bandra Talao
- Modak Sagar
- Powai Lake
- Tulshi Dam and Tulsi Lake
- Vihar Dam and Vihar Lake

== Amusement parks, gardens and grounds ==
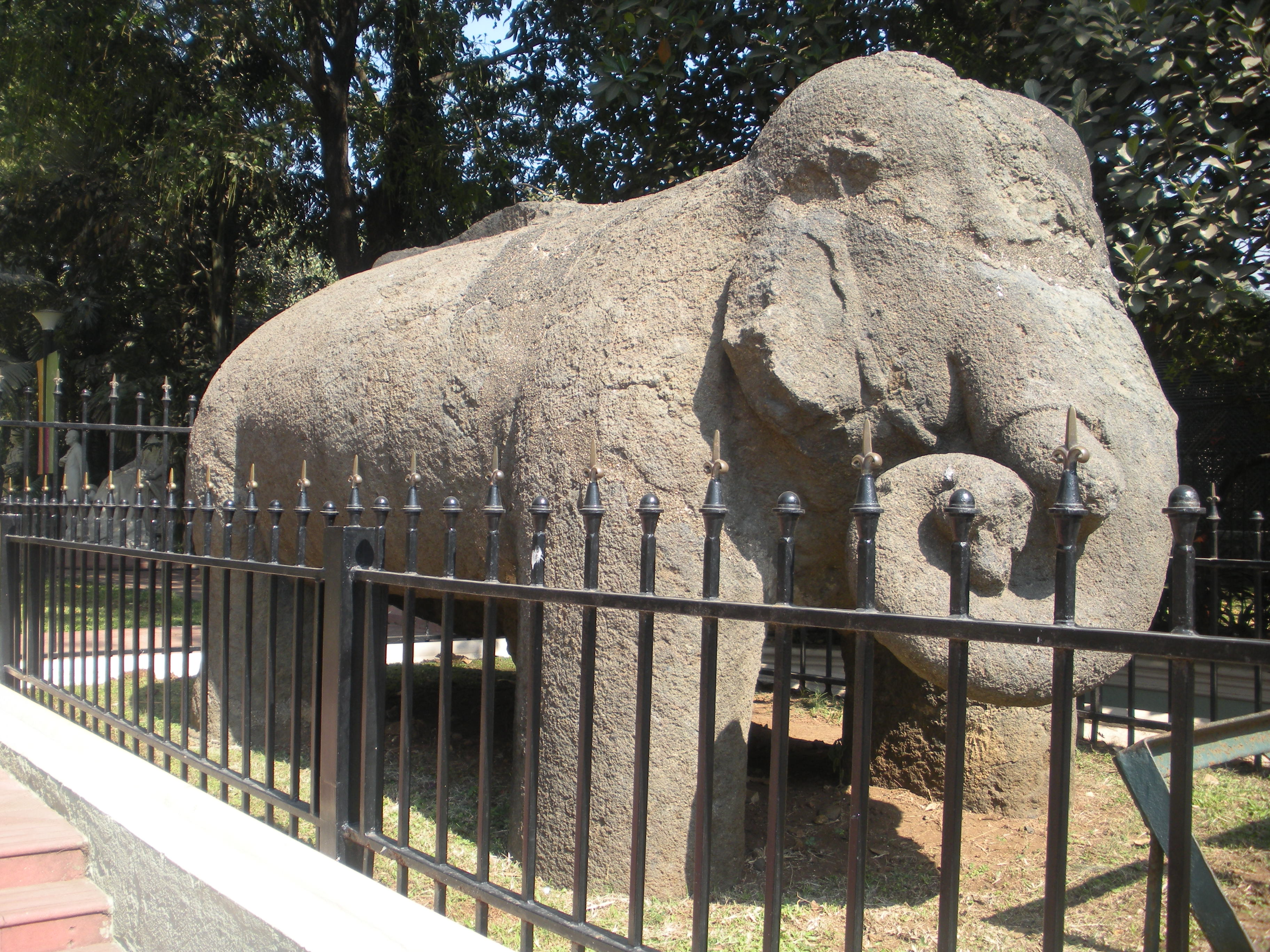
The elephant sculpture from the Elephanta Caves is installed at the Jijamata Udyaan.

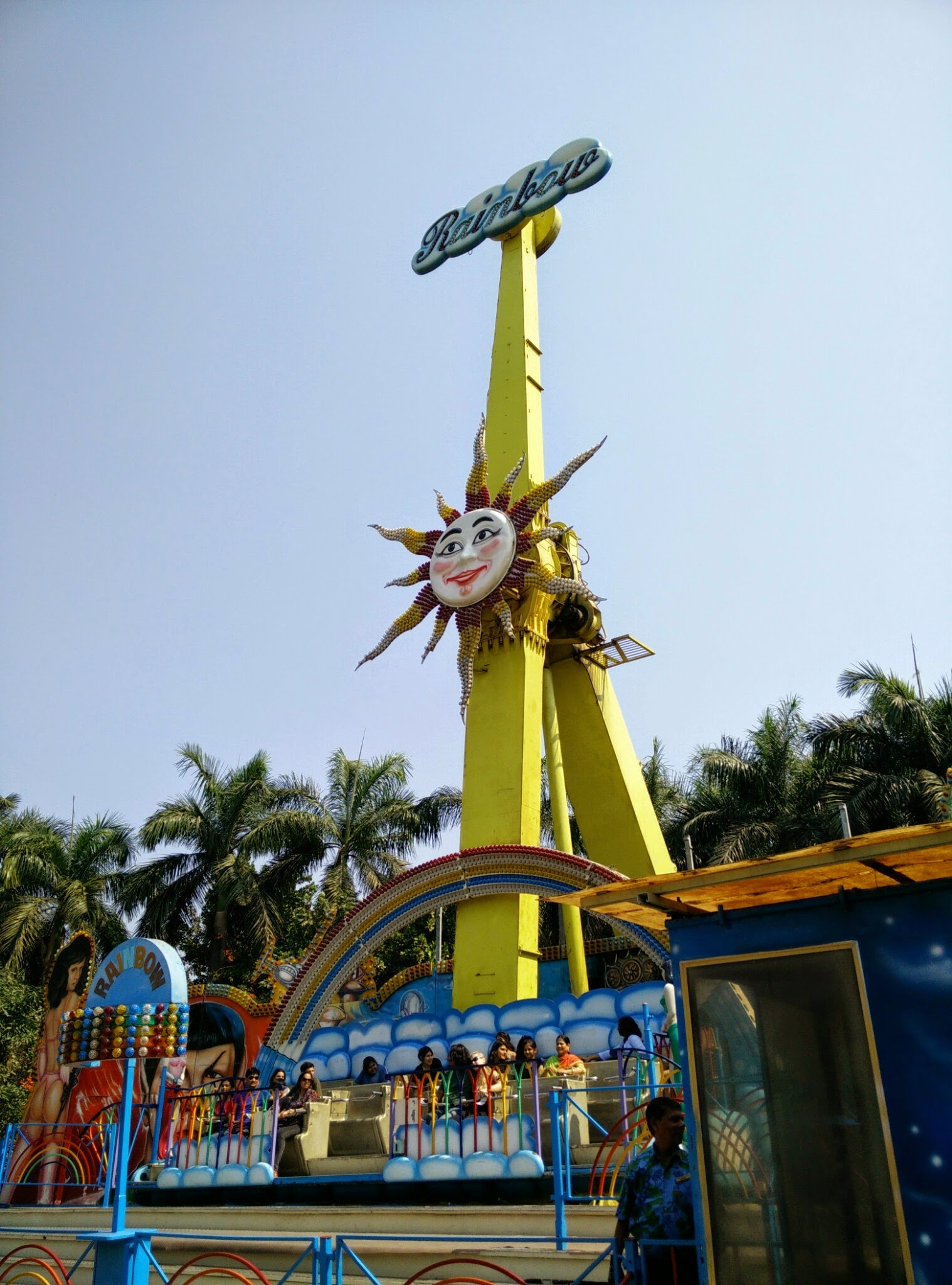
A rainbow ride in EsselWorld

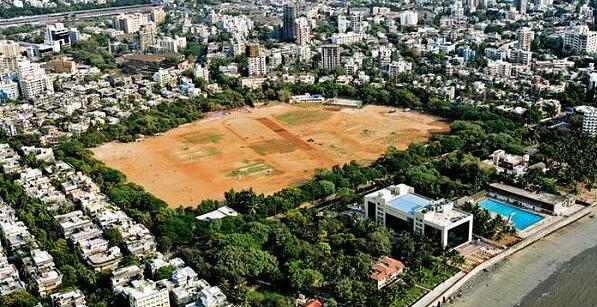
Shivaji Park aerial view in Dadar

- Adlabs Imagica
- Andheri Sports Complex
- B.P.T. Ground
- Bandra Kurla Complex Ground
- Brabourne Stadium
- Colaba Woods
- Cooperage Ground
- Cross Maidan
- Dadaji Kondadev Stadium
- DY Patil Stadium
- EsselWorld
- Gilbert Hill
- Gowalia Tank
- Hanging Gardens of Mumbai
- Horniman Circle Gardens
- Jijamata Udyaan
- Jogger's Park
- Joseph Baptista Gardens
- Kamala Nehru Park
- Mahalaxmi Racecourse
- Mahindra Hockey Stadium
- Middle Income Group Club Ground
- Oval Maidan
- Sardar Vallabhbhai Patel Indoor Stadium
- Shivaji Park
- Wankhede Stadium

== Cinemas and film studios ==
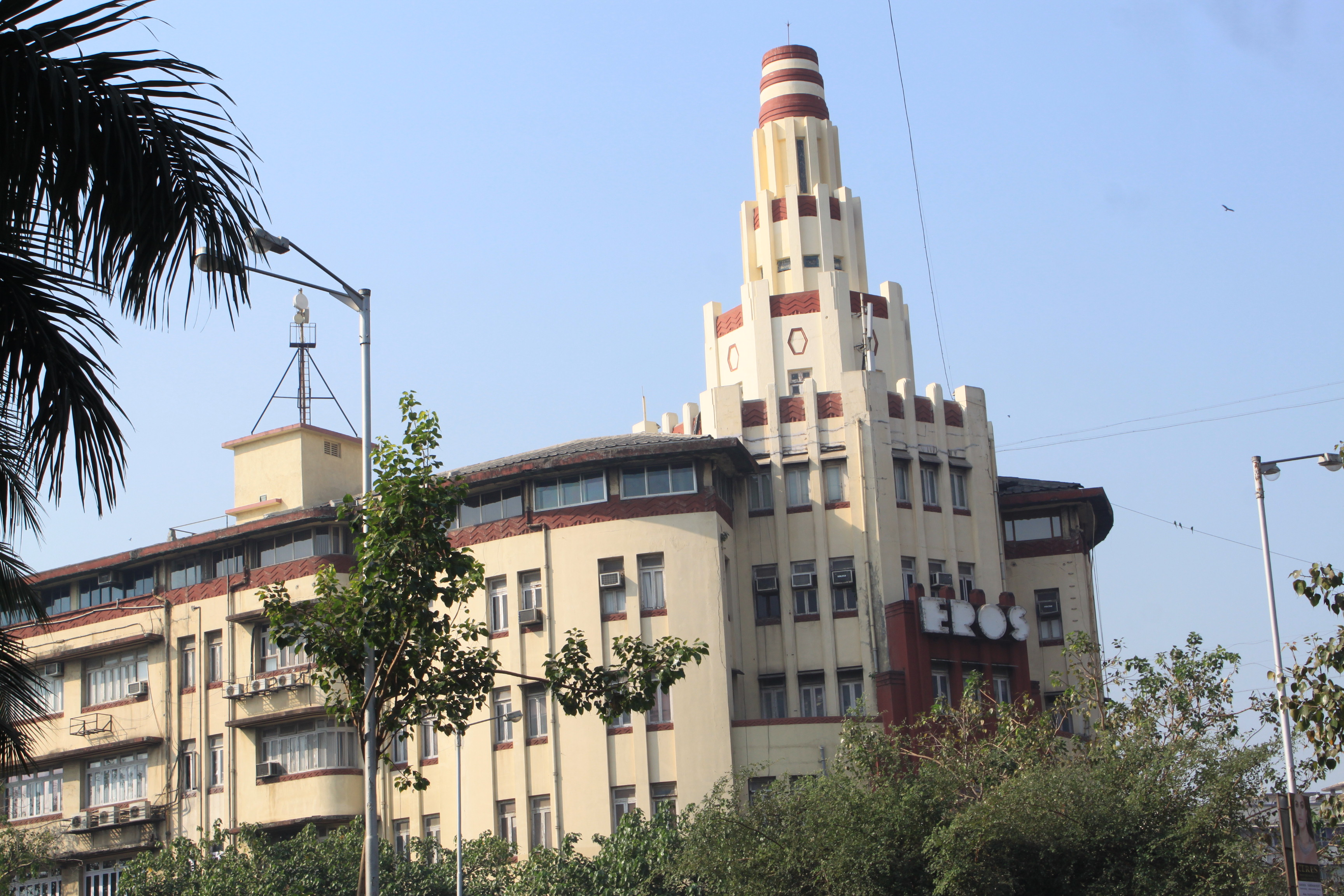
Eros Cinema

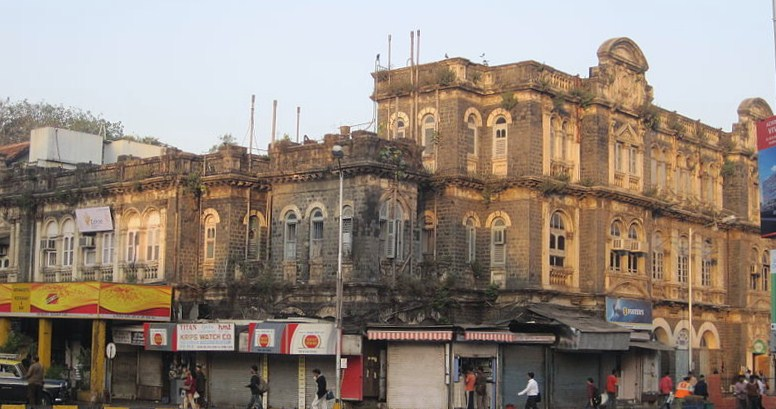
Capitol Cinema Mumbai

- Bombay Talkies
- Capitol Cinema
- Coronation Cinema
- Dadasaheb Phalke Chitranagari
- Eros Cinema
- Filmistan
- Kamalistan Studios
- Liberty Cinema
- Maratha Mandir
- Mehboob Studio
- Metro Big Cinemas
- New Empire Cinema
- Plaza cinema
- R. K. Studio
- Rajkamal Kalamandir
- Ranjit Studios
- Regal Cinema
- Royal Opera House
- Sterling Cineplex
- Wadia Movietone

== Malls and markets ==
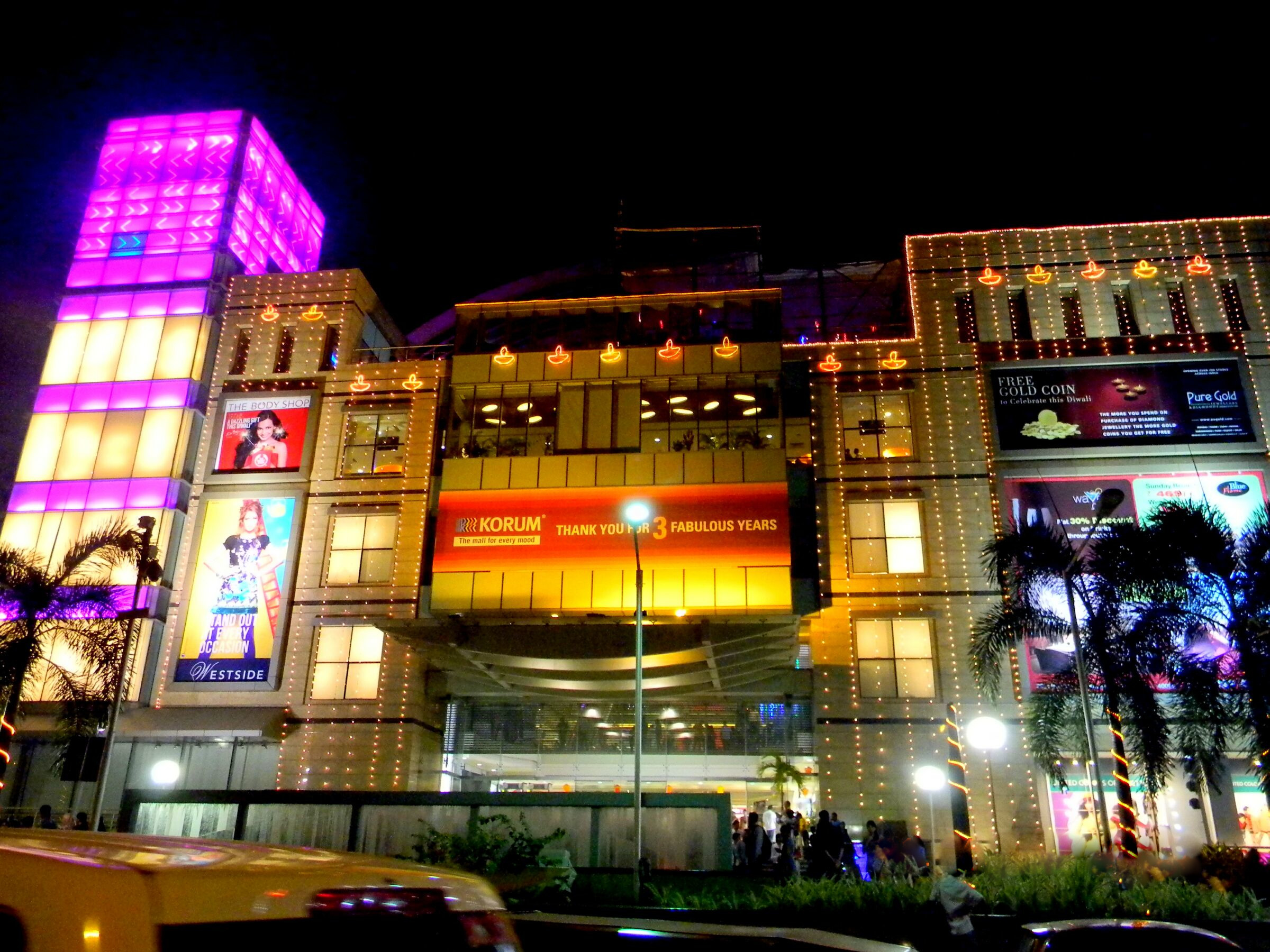
Korum Mall

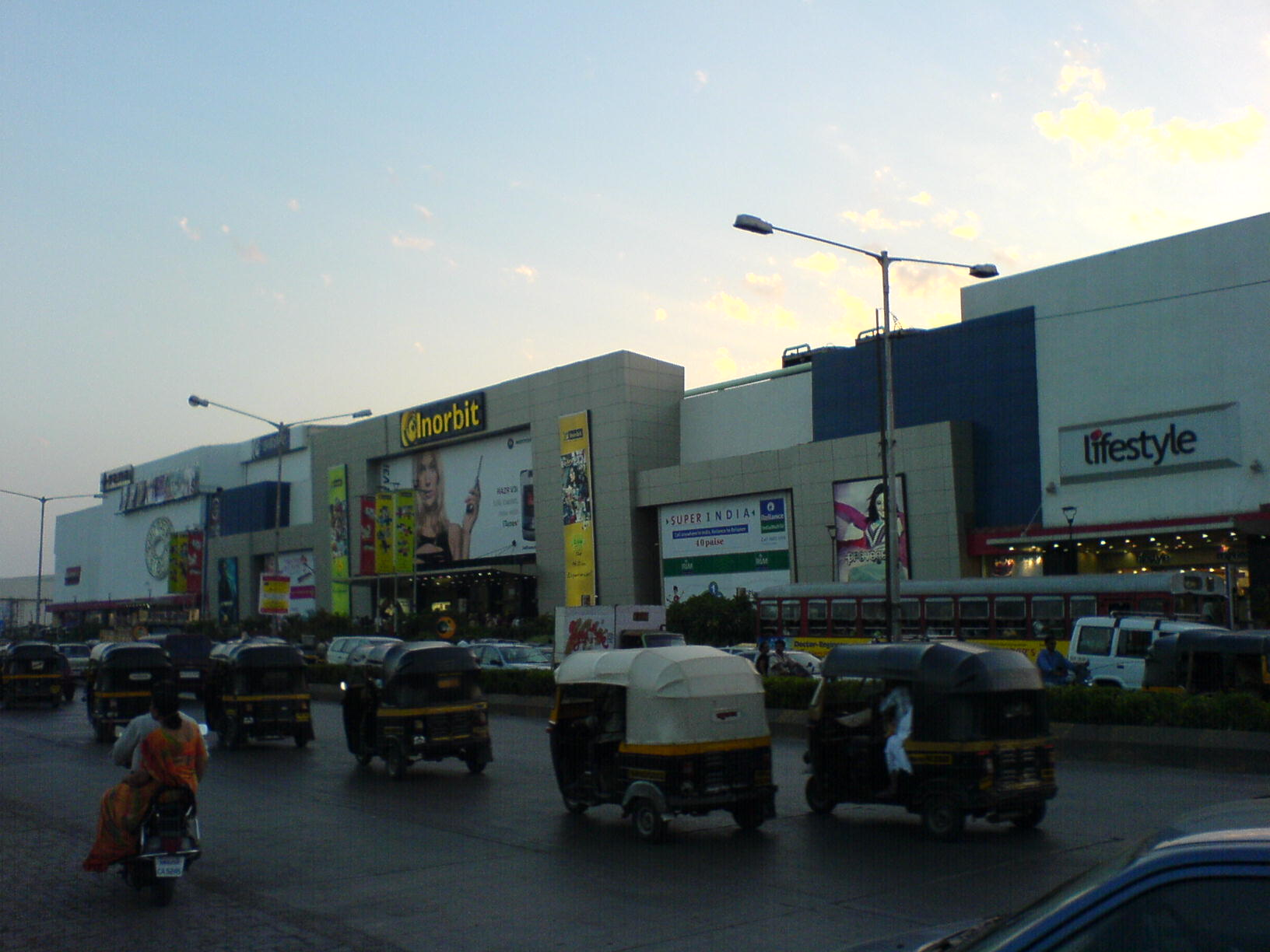
Inorbit Mall

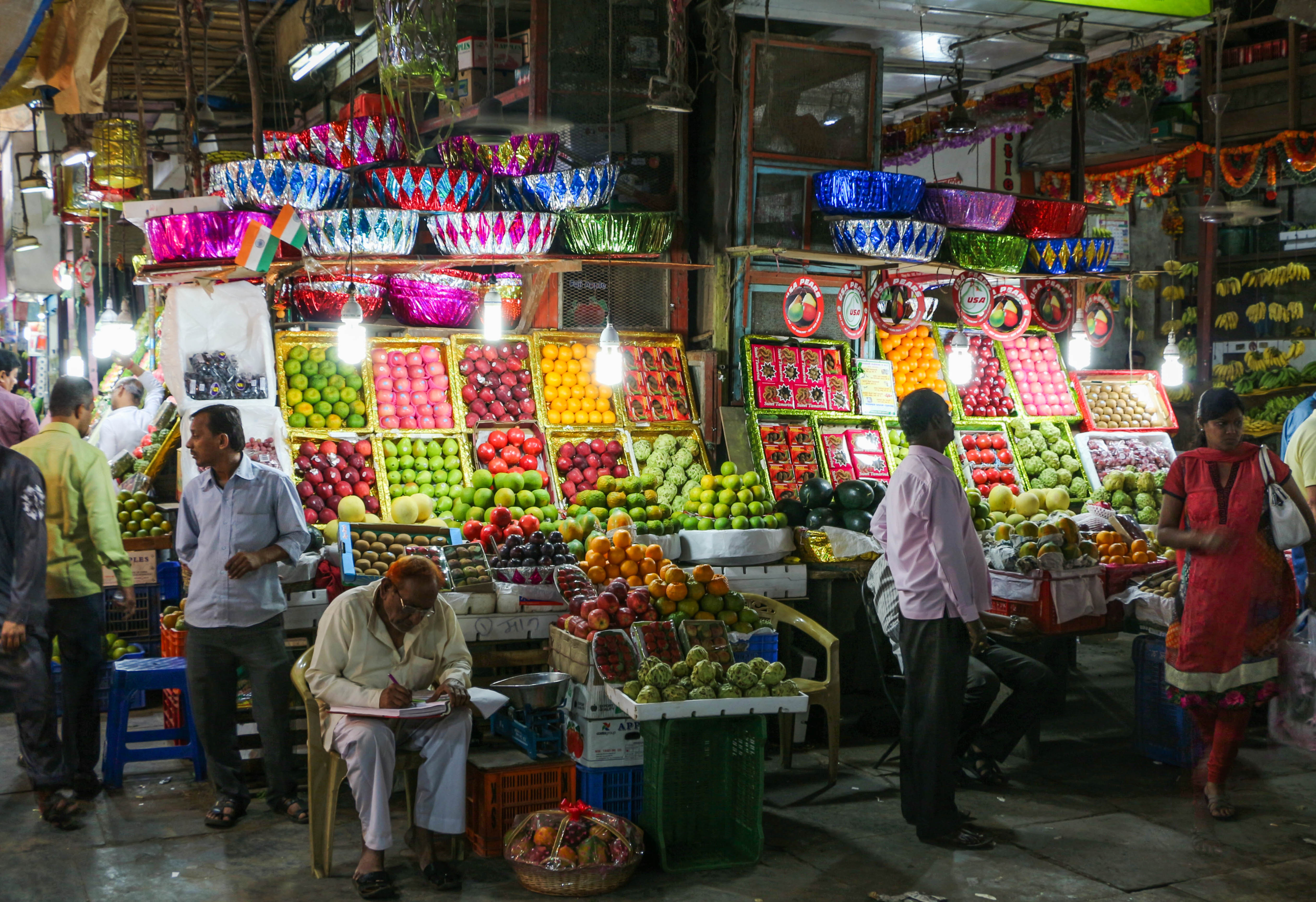
Fruit for sale in the Mahatma Jyotiba Phule Mandai

- Chor Bazaar
- Colaba Causeway
- Crawford Market
- Crossroads Mall
- Dava Bazaar
- Dharavi
- Fashion Street
- Hill Road
- Zaveri Bazaar
- High Street Phoenix
- Phoenix Marketcity
- Inorbit Mall, Malad
- Inorbit Mall, Vashi
- Infinity Mall, Andheri
- Infiniti Mall, Malad
- Lamington Road
- Linking Road
- Lohar Chawl
- Mahatma Jyotiba Phule Mandai
- Metro Junction Mall
- Princess Street
- R City Mall
- R-Mall
- Raghuleela Mall, Vashi
- Raghuleela Mega Mall
- Viviana Mall

== Places of worship ==
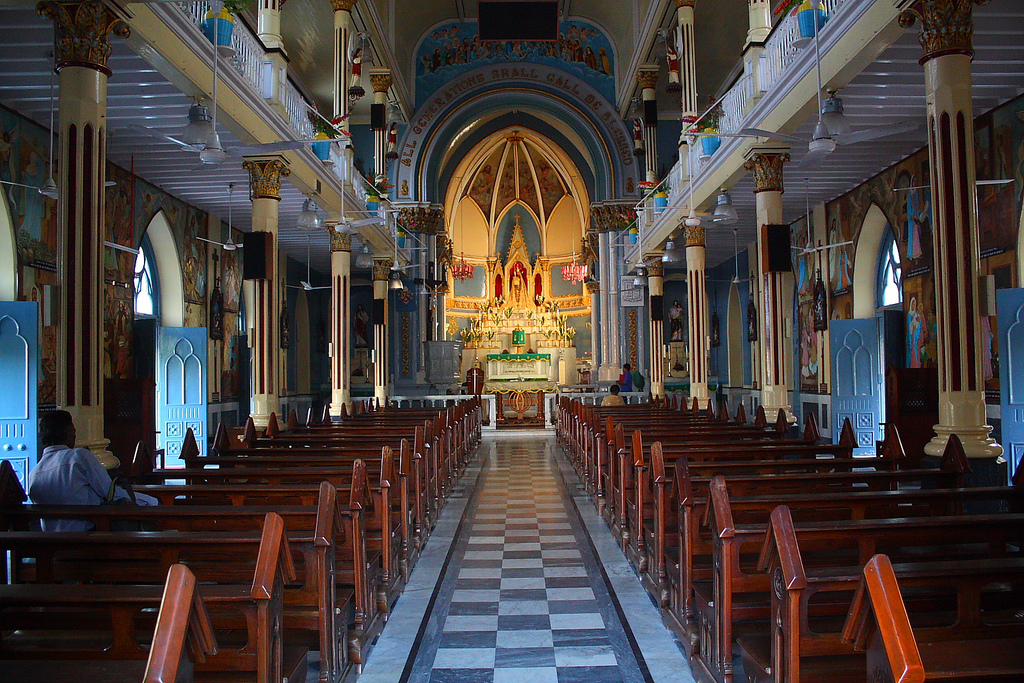
The altar of Mount Mary Church, Bandra

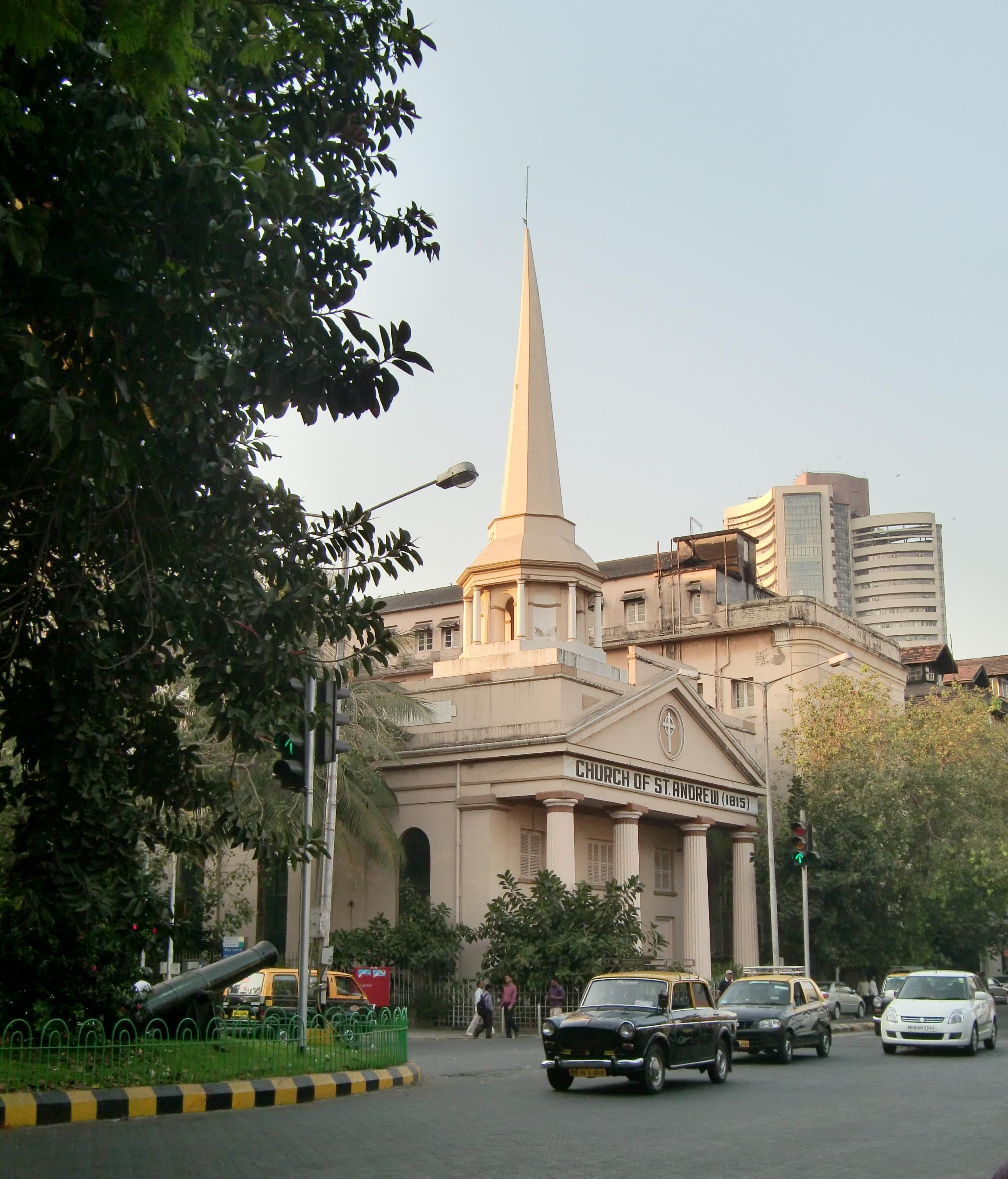
St. Andrew's Church

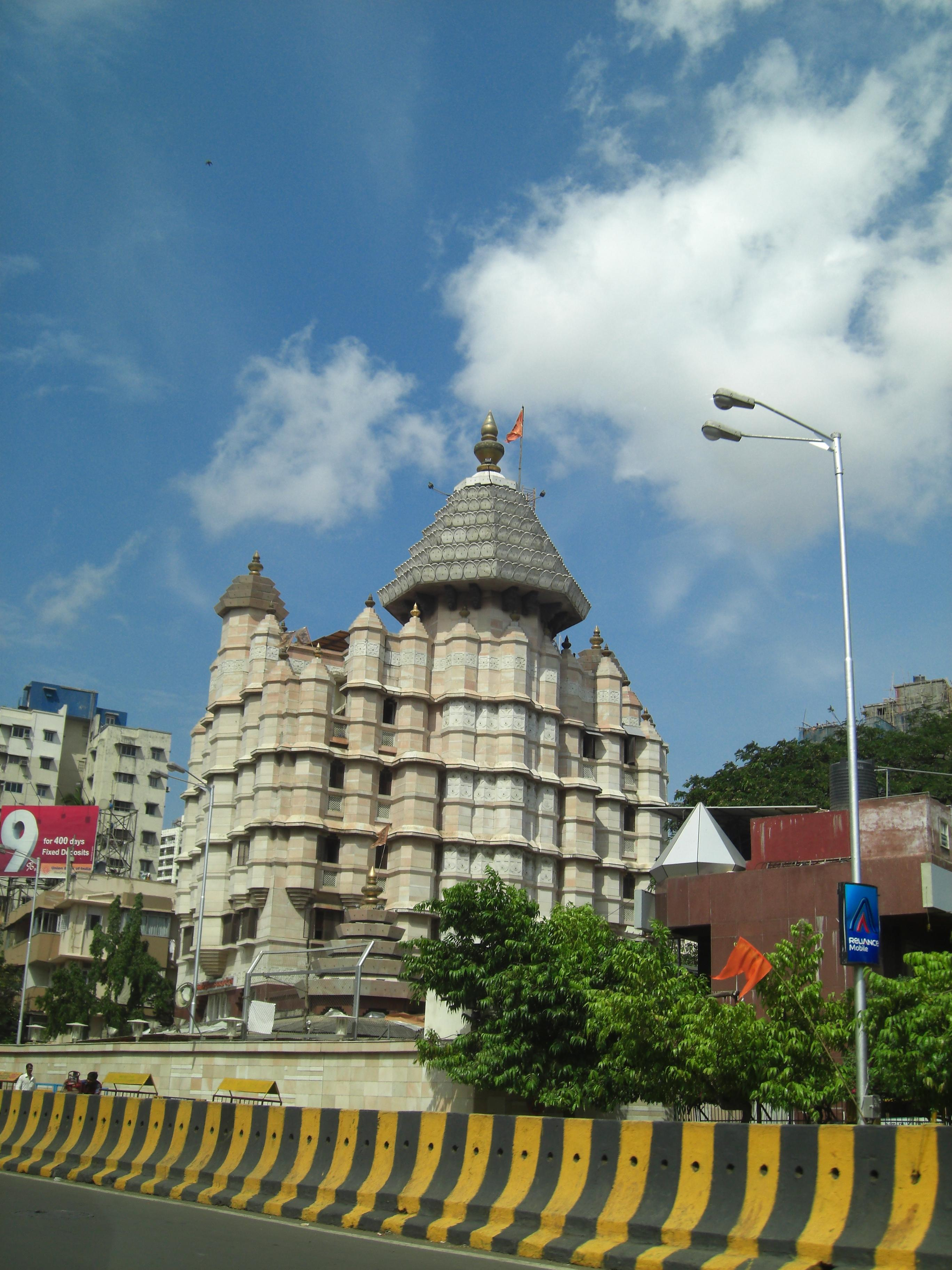
Siddhivinayak Temple

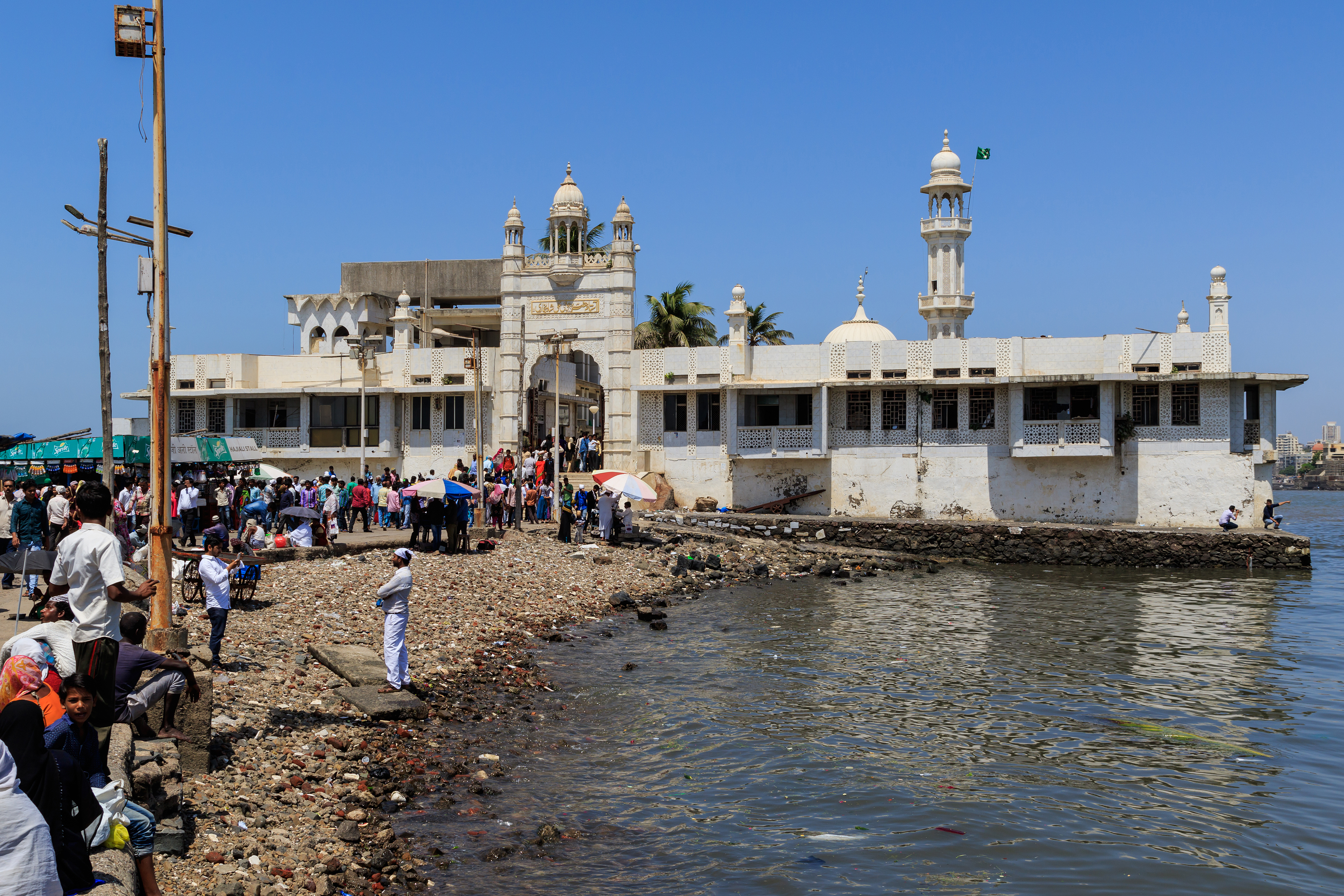
Haji Ali Dargah

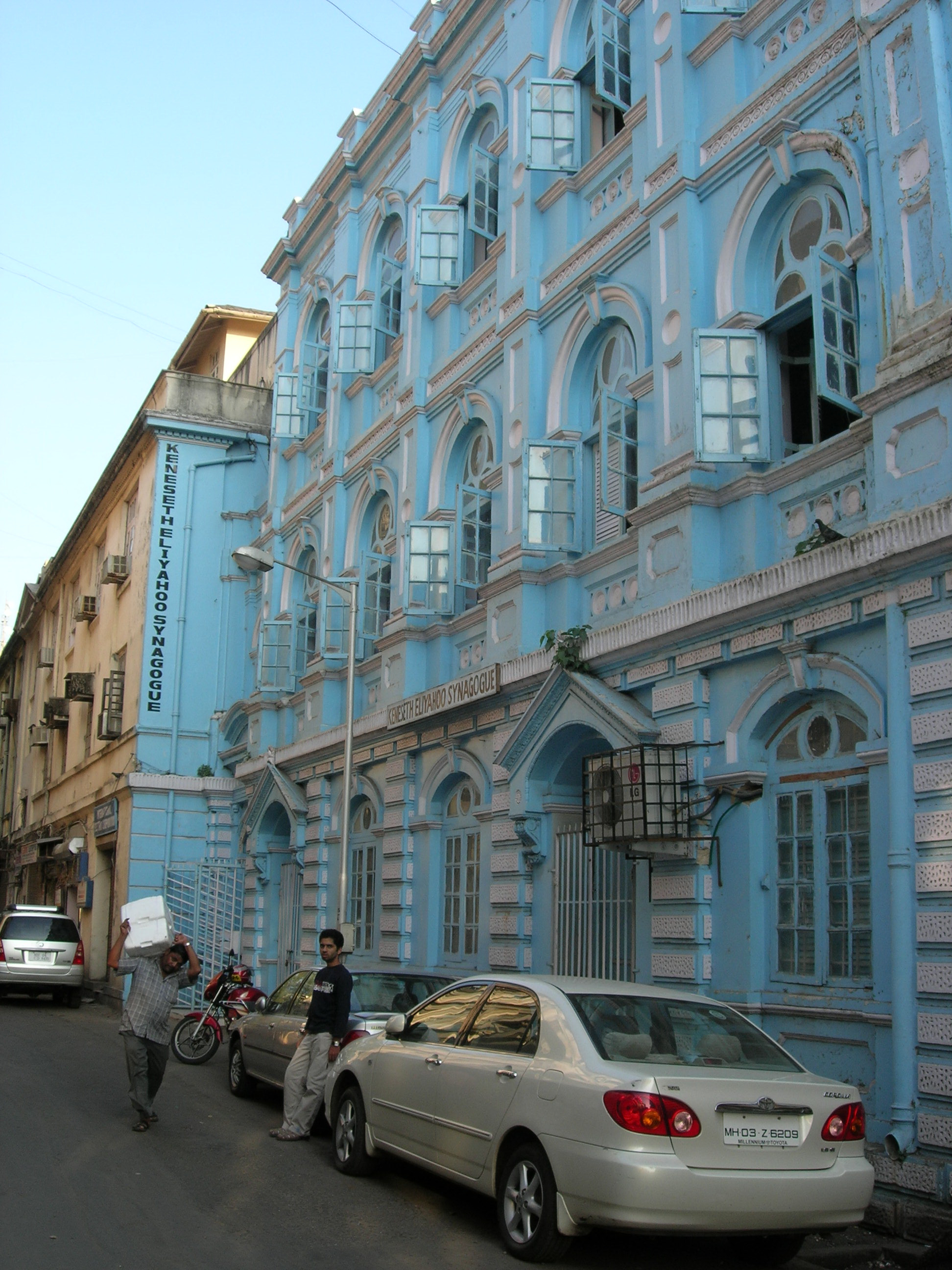
Knesset Eliyahoo synagogue

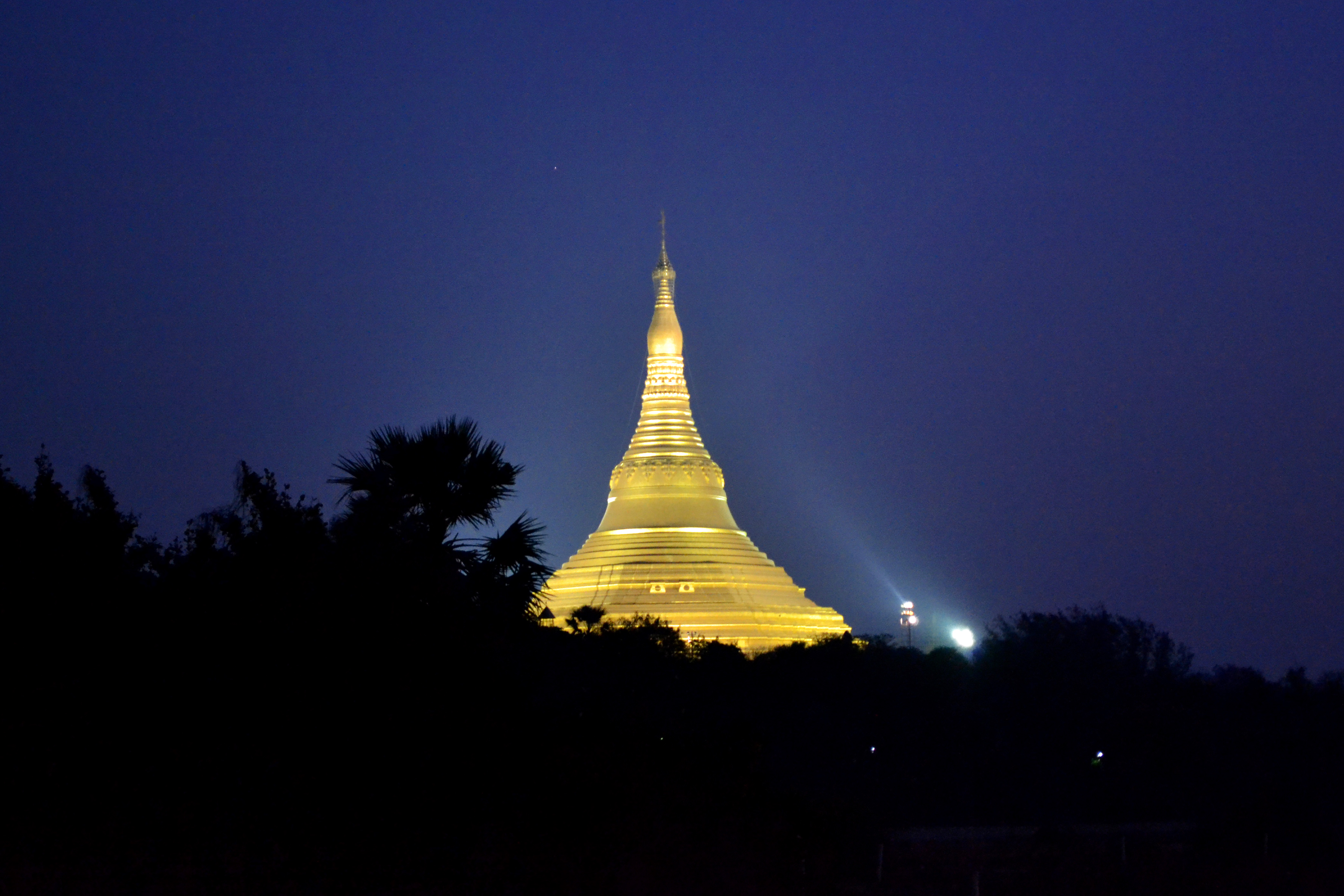
Night view of the Global Vipassana Pagoda

=== Hindu temples ===
- Babulnath
- Jivdani Mata
- Jogeshwari Caves
- Kadeshwari Devi Temple
- Lalbaugcha Raja
- Mahalakshmi Temple
- Mumba Devi Temple
- Shaneshwar Sansthan
- Shreebalajimandir
- Shri Swaminarayan Mandir
- Siddhivinayak Temple
- Wagheshwari Temple
- Walkeshwar Temple

=== Masjid or shrines ===
- Haji Ali Dargah
- Jama Masjid
- Makhdoom Ali Mahimi
- Raudat Tahera

=== Synagogues ===
- Gate of Mercy Synagogue
- Knesset Eliyahoo
- Magen David Synagogue (Byculla)
- Nariman House

=== Others ===
- Global Vipassana Pagoda
- Godiji Parshwanath Jain Temple, Pydhonie
- Gurudwara Khalsa Sabha, Matunga

== UNESCO World Heritage Sites ==
- Chhatrapati Shivaji Maharaj Terminus
- Elephanta Caves
- Ellora Caves
- Ajanta Caves
- Victorian Gothic and Art Deco Ensembles of Mumbai
