= Balaji =

Balaji may refer to:

== Religion ==
- Venkateswara, one of the incarnations of Vishnu
  - Balaji Mandir (disambiguation), a list of temples
- Balaji, a child form of deity Hanuman
  - Mehandipur Balaji Temple, in Rajasthan, India
  - Punrasar Balaji Temple, in Rajasthan, India
  - Salasar Balaji Temple, in Rajasthan, India

== Organisations ==
- Balaji Wafers, a FMCG group based in Rajkot, Gujarat
- Balaji Motion Pictures, a film production house in Mumbai, India
- Balaji Telefilms, a film production house in Mumbai, India

== People ==
=== Given name ===
- Balaji, an Indian name (for persons with the name see)
- Balaji Huddar, the nickname of Gopal Mukund Huddar (1902–1981), Indian anti-colonial activist and anti-fascist soldier
- Balaji K. Kumar, American/Indian film director
- Balaji Srinivasan, American entrepreneur, investor, and futurist

=== Surname ===
- K. Balaji (1934–2009), South Indian producer and actor
- PB Balaji, Indian business executive, CEO of Jaguar Land Rover
- Suchir Balaji (1998–2024), artificial intelligence researcher and whistleblower

== Other uses ==
- Balaji (leopard), a leopard in the Sri Venkateswara Zoological Park
- Balaji, Iran, a village in West Azerbaijan Province, Iran
