= Balaji Mandir =

Balaji Mandir may refer to a number of temples dedicated to the Hindu deity Balaji, also known as Venkateswara:

== India ==
=== Rajasthan ===
- Mehandipur Balaji Temple, a temple of Hanuman in Rajasthan, India
- Punrasar Balaji Temple, a temple of Hanuman in Rajasthan, India
- Salasar Balaji Temple, a temple of Hanuman in Rajasthan, India

=== Other Indian states ===
- Bageshwar Dham Balaji Temple, in Chhatarpur, Madhya Pradesh
- Balaji Mandir, Pune, in Pashan, Pune, India
- Balaji Temple, Ketkawla, in Pune, Maharashtra, India
- Chilkoor Balaji Temple, a temple of Balaji near Hyderabad, India
- Shreebalajimandir, in Mumbai, Kandivali, Charkop, India
- Sri Balaji Temple, T. Nagar, in Chennai, Tamil Nadu, India
- Unao Balaji Sun Temple, in Madhya Pradesh, India

== Elsewhere ==
- Tividale Tirupathy Balaji Temple, in Tividale, West Midlands, England
- Balaji Temple, San Jose, California
- Sri Venkateswara Temple of Austin, Texas
