= Korum Mall =

Coordinates: 19.202°N 72.965°E

- Location: Thane, Maharashtra, India
- Opened: 2 September 2009
- Developer: Kalpataru Limited
- Floors: 2 Basements + Ground Atrium + 4 Floors
- Website: www.korum.in

Korum Mall is a shopping mall located in Thane city of Maharashtra state in India. It is a home to a number of branded shops. It is a project of Kalpataru Limited.

== Features ==
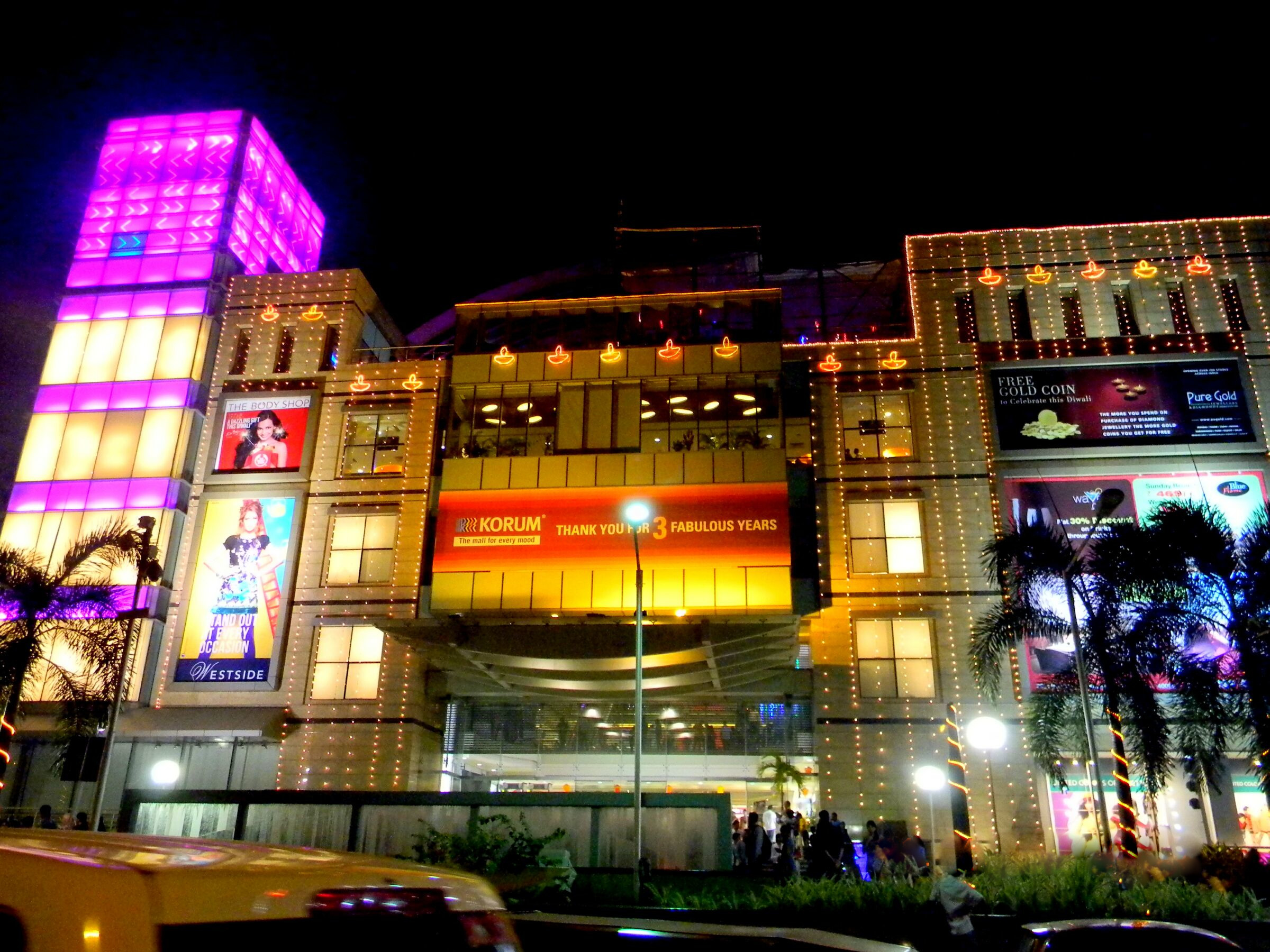
Outside view of the mall

Inside view of the mall

The mall is located in Thane city, off the Eastern Express Highway. Its constructed area is 10 lakhs square feet and retail (GLA) area spreads over 4.5 lakhs square feet. The grand atrium covers 25,000 sq ft. The mall has a 20,000 square feet (1,900 m^{2}) hobby and leisure store, a 70,000 sq ft Hypermarket, a 15,000 square feet (1,400 m^{2}) family entertainment centre, a four-screen Inox Multiplex with a seating capacity of over 1000 seats, a food court that can seat 550 people, and basement parking as well as a separate car park building can park up to 1100 Cars and 700 two wheelers.

== See also ==
- Viviana Mall
