= Raghuleela Mall =

Raghuleela Mall may refer to:

- Raghuleela Mall located at Vashi.
- Raghuleela Mall located at Kandivili.
