= K. Raheja Realty =

Real estate company

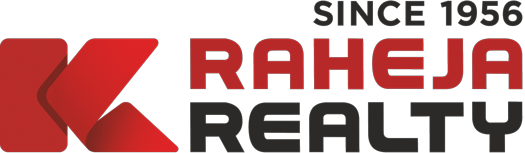
- Industry: Real estate
- Founded: 1956
- Headquarters: Mumbai, India
- Area served: India
- Key people: Sandeep Raheja (Chairman & managing director)
- Subsidiaries: Infiniti Mall
- Website: www.krahejarealty.com

K. Raheja Realty is an Indian real estate company, headquartered in Mumbai, Maharashtra. The company was founded in 1956 and is led by Sandeep Raheja, who serves as both the chairman and managing director. K. Raheja Realty operates across multiple sectors including residential, commercial, retail, and hospitality development. The company owns and manages various real estate assets in India and operates Infiniti Mall, a chain of shopping malls.

== History ==
K. Raheja Realty was founded as K Raheja Construction in 1956 and is located in Mumbai, Maharashtra. Sandeep Raheja, a graduate of The Academy of Architecture, Mumbai, serves as the chairman and managing director of the company. The company is involved in the development of residential, industrial, and commercial projects in Mumbai, Bengaluru, Coimbatore, Chennai, and Pune. It expanded its operations into the hospitality sector through its wholly owned subsidiary, K Raheja Resorts & Hospitality Services (KRRHS). It operates three hotels: The Retreat Madh, Ramada Plaza Palm Grove, and The Carlton. In 2001, K Raheja acquired a four-star property in Chennai, previously known as Hotel Sreelekha, through its subsidiary KRRHS. K Raheja Resorts entered into a management agreement with Marriott International Inc to launch the Courtyard by Marriott brand in India. In 2018, Conrad Hotels, a hotel chain owned by American hospitality company Hilton Worldwide, opened its first Conrad hotel in India. This hotel is managed by Hilton Worldwide and owned by Palm Grove Beach Hotels, a subsidiary of K Raheja Realty.

== Subsidiaries ==
=== Infiniti Mall ===
Infiniti Mall is a chain of shopping malls in India, operating as a subsidiary of K. Raheja Realty. The first Infiniti Mall began operations in Andheri, Mumbai, in 2004. It is the city's third oldest shopping mall. A second mall was launched in Malad in May 2011.

=== Sheila Gopal Raheja Foundation ===
K. Raheja Realty's philanthropic arm, the Sheila Gopal Raheja Foundation, was established in 1998 as a Public Charitable Trust under the Bombay Public Trust Act. Named after the late Sheila Raheja, the wife of the late Gopal Raheja, it focuses on education and charitable causes. The foundation facilitated the creation of educational institutions like the L S Raheja School of Architecture and the Sheila Raheja Institute of Hotel Management. In 2022, it partnered with Tata Memorial Hospital and the ImPaCCT Foundation for the 'HOPE 2022' initiative, supporting children with cancer.

== Projects ==
- The Retreat Hotel and Convention Centre
- The Carlton
- Ramada Plaza by Wyndham Palm Grove
- Conrad Pune
- Courtyard by Marriott
- JW Marriott Mumbai Juhu
- Raheja Residency, Mumbai

== Awards ==
In 2023, the company received two awards: 'Landscape Project of the Year' and 'Residential Complex of the Year' for its residential project Raheja Residency at the 15th Realty+ Conclave & Excellence Awards. In 2024, K Raheja was awarded the Maharashtra Gaurav Award, a state recognition for contributions to real estate in tier 2 and 3 cities. The award ceremony was held at Taj Hotels in Mumbai, where the company was awarded by Uday Samant, Minister of Industries, Government of Maharashtra. Additionally, the company received the 'Ultra Luxury Residential Project of the Year' award for its Raheja Residency project at the Times Business Awards, North 2024. The award was presented by renowned film actor Suniel Shetty during the ceremony held at The Grand in New Delhi on 3 April 2024.
