= Balaji Wafers =

Indian snack food company

Balaji Wafers Private Limited
- Trade name: Balaji Wafers
- Type: Private limited
- Industry: Food products
- Founded: 1974; 52 years ago
- Founder: Chandubhai Virani; Kanubhai Virani; Bhikhubhai Virani
- Headquarters: Rajkot, Gujarat, India
- Key people: Chandubhai Virani; Bhikhubhai Virani; Keyur Virani; Mihir Virani; Pranay Virani; Shyam Virani
- Products: Potato chips; Namkeen
- Revenue: ₹5,500 crore (US$580 million) (2023)
- Number of employees: 1,987
- Website: balajiwafers.com

Balaji Wafers is a snack food manufacturer and distributor in India. Founded in 1974, it produces and distributes a variety of potato chips and other grain-based snack foods.

== History ==
The company is owned by Chandubhai Virani, who was born into a family of farmers in Jamnagar district Gujarat. At the age of 15, Chandubhai and his brothers Bhikhubhai and Meghjibhai migrated to Dhundhoraji, a small village in Kalavad Taluka, Jamnagar district of Gujarat. Their father, Popatbhai Virani, was a farmer who sold ancestral agricultural land and gave the brothers ₹20,000 (US$210) to venture into business.

The family chose the name because there was a Balaji temple just outside the cinema where they started their wafer business.

The Viranis invested in farm equipment but did not succeed and lost the money. The brothers then started a wafer business from a canteen at Astron Cinema in Rajkot, Gujarat, in 1974. Until 1989, the wafers were produced at the Viranis' house and distributed in and around Rajkot city.

In 1989, the brothers set up their potato wafer facility near Rajkot at Aji G.I.D.C. (Industrial Zone). Balaji Wafers Private Limited was established in 1992 with four facilities spread across the nation. Balaji Wafers then set up a fully automatic plant near Metoda G.I.D.C. which is in the area of the village Vajdi, outside Rajkot.

== Market shares ==
Balaji's share of the local potato and vegetable chips market grew from 9.5% in 2008 to 13.7% in 2012, according to Euromonitor International. Balaji has a share of 71% in the western market. In Gujarat, it has a share of 90%. The Economic Times recognized Balaji Wafers as Sultan of Wafers.

The company posted sales of ₹5,010 crore (US$520 million) for fiscal year 2023.

Balaji Wafers is also a member of the Federation of Sweets & Namkeen Manufacturers (FSNM).
