= Kadeshwari Devi Temple =

- Kadeshwari Devi Mandir
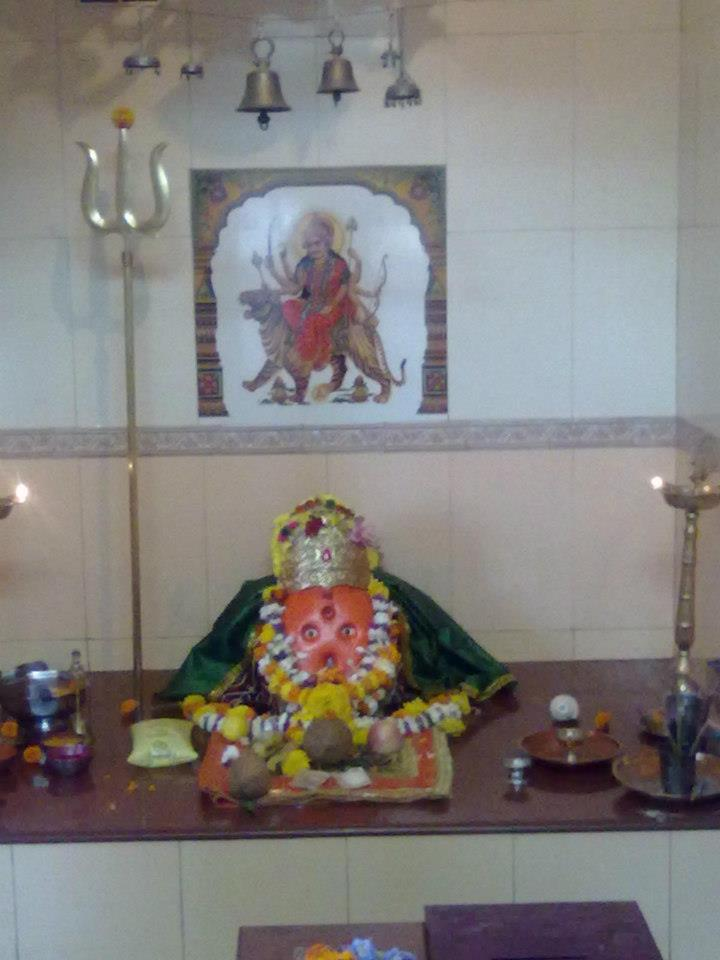
- Kadeshwari Devi's idol in the temple

- Location within Mumbai

Religion
- Affiliation: Hinduism
- District: Mumbai
- Deity: Kadeshwari

Location
- Location: Bandra
- State: Maharashtra
- Country: India
- Interactive map of Kadeshwari Devi Temple
- Coordinates: 19°2′32.8″N 72°49′11.34″E

Kadeshwari Devi Temple is a Hindu temple located in Bandra, Mumbai, India. The temple is dedicated to mother goddess Kadeshwari situated on the top of hill behind Bandra Fort in Land's End, Bandstand, Mumbai.

The idol of Kadeshwari is in the form of Shakti. It is approximately 2 kilometers from Bandra railway station.

Due to the sea water constantly eroding the foundation of the temple and of the peripheral walls of the Bandra Fort, Brihanmumbai Municipal Corporation had plans to construct a bund in 2006.
