= Wagheshwari Temple =

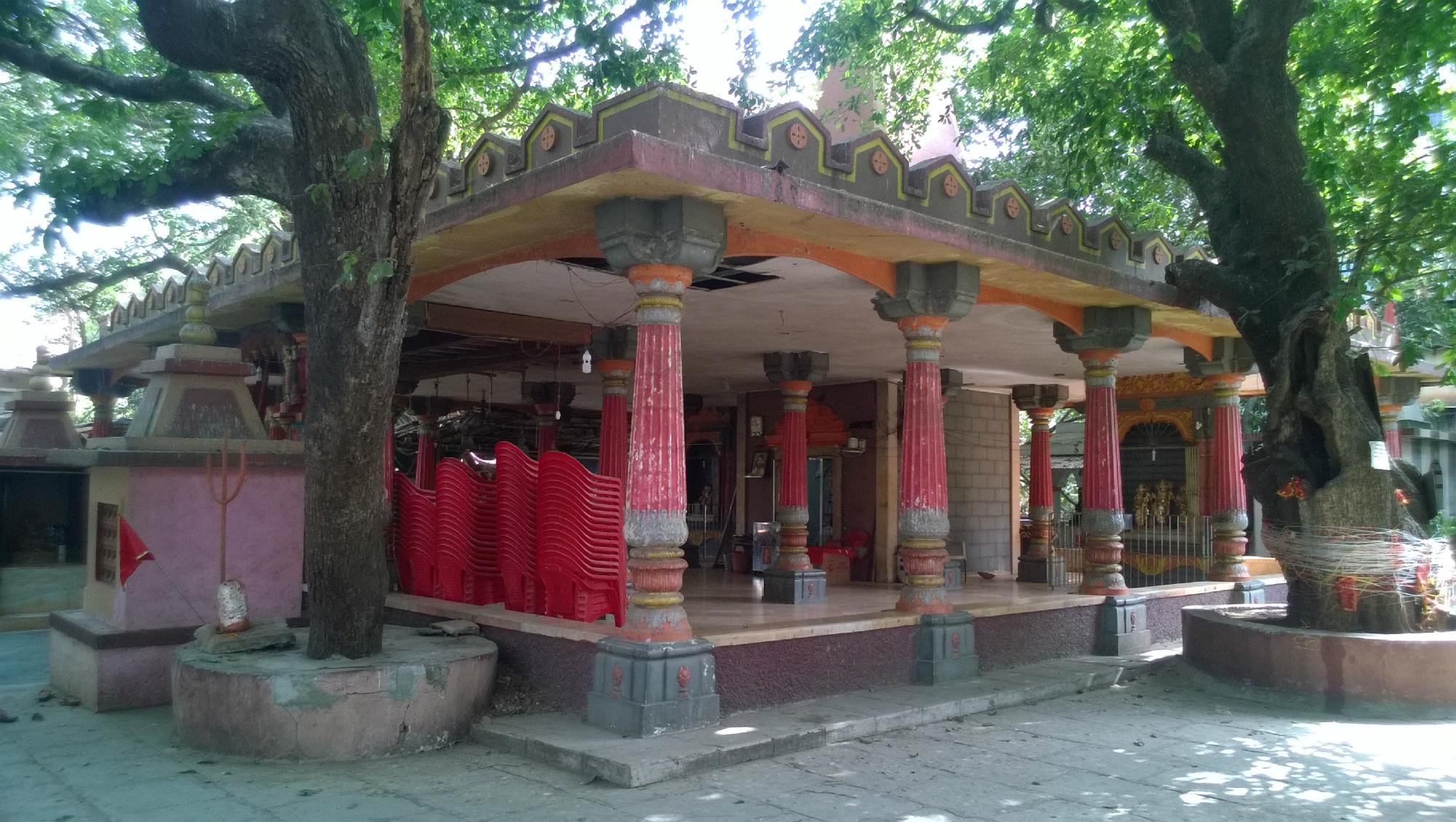
- View of Wageshwari Temple at Goregaon East

- Location within Mumbai, Maharashtra

Religion
- Affiliation: Hinduism
- District: Mumbai Suburban
- Deity: Wagheshwari Mata
- Festival: Navratri

Location
- Location: Gokuldham Colony
- State: Maharashtra
- Country: India
- Interactive map of Wagheshwari Temple
- Coordinates: 19°10′31.3″N 72°52′23.5″E

Architecture
- Type: Hindu Temple

Wagheshwari Temple is one of the famous temples of Mumbai situated near Gokuldham Colony in Goregaon East. It is dedicated to Hindu Goddess Bhagwati. The deity is also known as Wagheshwari Mata who is supposed to be the Goddess Parvati in her form of Goddess Durga or an incarnation of Goddess Saraswati in her form of Vagdevi

The entrance of the temple is decorated with huge sculptures of elephants. An important tradition in this temple is the sindoor ceremony where married women apply red powder on each other's foreheads. Sindoor is considered a sacred symbol of marriage for Hindu women, and thus the ceremony holds an important place in the lives of these women.
