= Jogeshwari Caves =

Caves in Mumbai, India

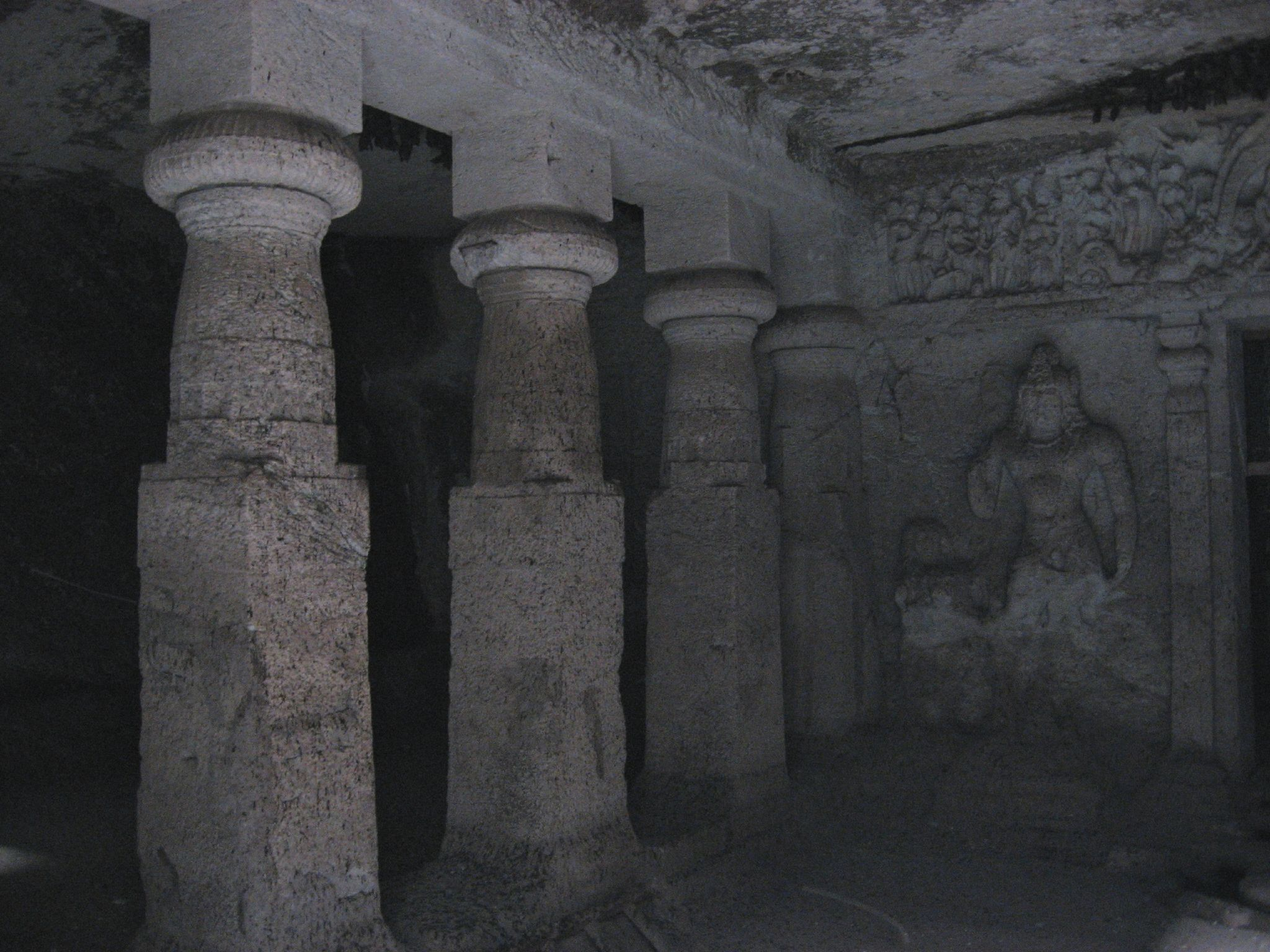
- Jogeshwari caves interior
- Interactive map of Jogeshwari Caves
- Location: Jogeshwari (E), Mumbai
- Coordinates: 19.1391°N 72.8568°E
- Elevation: 15 m (49 ft)
- Entrances: 3
- Difficulty: easy

The Jogeshwari Caves are some of the earliest Hinduism cave temple sculptures located in the Mumbai suburb of Jogeshwari, India. The caves date back to the sixth century, Chalukya dynasty. They were found during the excavation of Ajanta and Elephanta in Maharashtra. These caves belong to the Hindu deity Jogeshwari. According to historian and scholar Walter Spink, Jogeshwari is the earliest major cave temple in India and (in terms of total length) "the largest".

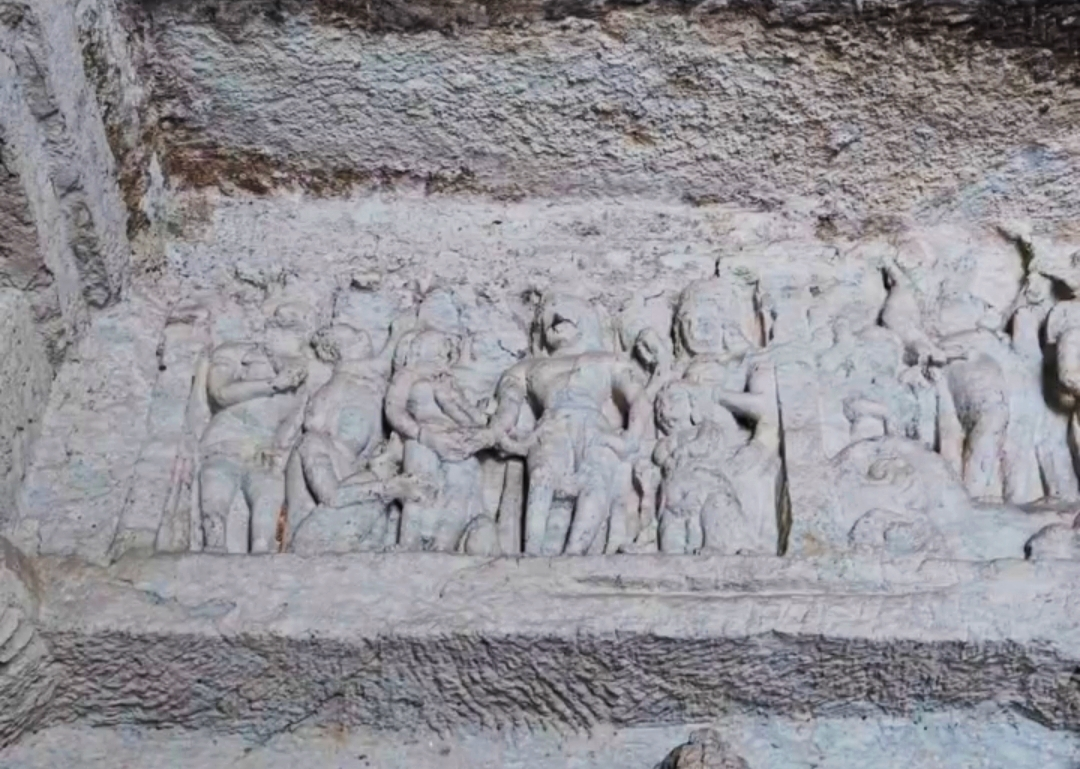

The caves are located off the Western Express Highway, and are surrounded by encroachments. The caves are accessed through a long flight of stairs into the main hall of this cavernous space. It has many pillars and a Lingam at the end. Idols of Dattatreya, Hanuman, and Ganesh line the walls. There are also relics of two doorkeepers. The cave also has a murti and footprints of the goddess Jogeshwari (Yogeshwari), after whom the area is named. The goddess is considered a Kuladevi by some Marathi people and also worshipped by some migrant groups from Gujarat. These caves are the earliest Pashupata Caves in Mumbai. The caves contain six sculptural panels depicting different episodes from Shaivism, including the marriage of Shiva and Parvati, Andhakasura Vad, Shiva accepting Ravana as his disciple, Shiva and Parvati playing dice, Nataraja and Lakulisha Shiva. The cave also includes sculptures and pillars of Mahayana Buddhist architecture.
