= Infiniti Mall =

- Location: Malad, Mumbai; Andheri, Mumbai;
- Coordinates: 19.184758°N 72.8316178°E
- Opened: 2004
- Developer: K Raheja Realty
- Owner: K. Raheja Realty
- Parking: Available
- Website: www.infinitimall.com

Infiniti Mall is a chain of shopping malls in India. It is a subsidiary of K Raheja Realty, which has been in the business of construction and property development since the 1960s. The first Infiniti Mall opened in 2004, in Andheri, Mumbai. Infiniti Mall launched their second property in Mumbai, at Malad, in May 2011.

== Infiniti Mall, Andheri ==
Infiniti Mall, Andheri located at Oshiwara Link Road, Andheri (West), was built in 2004 and is spread across 310,000 square feet (29,000 m^{2}) with 65 stores, a six-screen multiplex (PVR Icon), food court, Family Entertainment Center and restaurants besides shopping. The Andheri branch is the third oldest mall in Mumbai, as well as the second oldest in Mumbai Suburban.

== Infiniti Mall, Malad ==
The Infiniti Mall located in Malad West is the larger of the two malls. It includes an indoor rollercoaster and 35,000 sq. ft. food court, as well as a PVR Cinema multiplex.

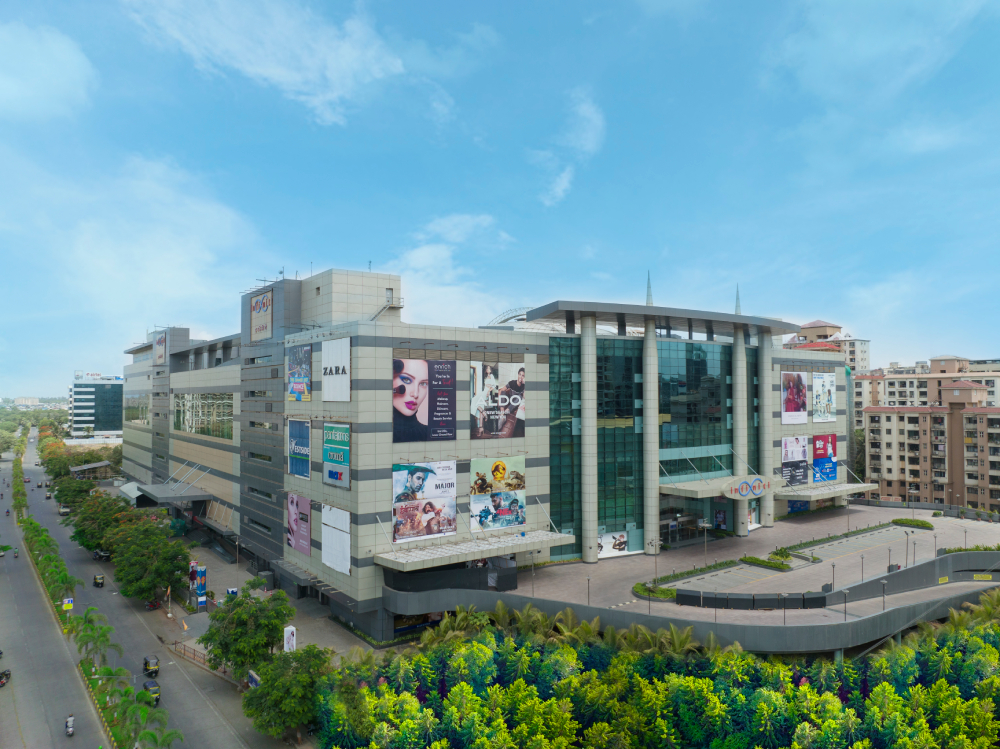
Infiniti Mall - Malad

== Awards and recognition ==
- 2014: Retail Property of the Year - West Zone Award.
- 2014: Most Admired Shopping Centre of the Year - Metro (West) award.
- 2021: Mumbai International Shopping Centre Awards (MISCA).
- 2023: IMAGES Most Admired Shopping Centre of the Year – CSR (Community Healthcare), awarded to Infiniti Mall, Malad.
