= Shaneshwar Sansthan =

Temple dedicated to Shani in Mumbai

Shaneshwar Sansthan is the open temple of Lord Shree Shani in Dombivli near Mumbai city. Here Shani Sansthan means a spiritual organisation established for Lord Shree Shani. This Sansthan was established by the spiritual master Sadguru Shree Omkar Maharaj on 15 January 2008. Thousands of devotees from all over Mumbai city daily visit this temple to get blessings of the Lord Shree Shani.
