= Balaji Temple, San Jose =

Hindu temple

Balaji Matha & Temple
- Location in California

Religion
- Affiliation: Hinduism
- Deity: Lord Balaji and Mahalakshmi

Location
- Location: San Jose
- State: California
- Country: United States
- Coordinates: 37.42386245727539°N 121.96757507324219°W

Website
- https://www.balajitemple.net

The Balaji Temple in San Jose is a Hindu temple located in San Jose, California. Balaji Temple is a spiritual, non-profit organization dedicated to sharing the universal truths of the Vedas and Upanishads in India. The temple was established by Swami Narayananda in the year 2006 in Sunnyvale. The permanent center in San Jose was inaugurated in the year 2012 from May 30 - June 3. The ceremony was attended by Dave Cortese, serving on the Santa Clara Board of Supervisors and the Mayors of Milpitas and Sunnyvale. The temple also received a certification of recognition from the California State Assembly for the contribution to the community.

In 2010, Balaji temple opened a sister center in Bangalore, India that's helping the community by offering free yoga classes and Meditation. The temple also received a donation of 23 acre land in Hollister, CA, and is used for retreats.

The temple inaugurated a shrine dedicated to Sai Baba and Panduranga deities in 2013.

Balaji temple celebrates all major Hindu Festivals like Shiv Rathri, Navrathri, Diwali. The Temple’s annual Guruvandana Puja is celebrated to glorify God and honor the Guru for the services rendered to the welfare of the people and the community.
