= Punrasar =

- Village
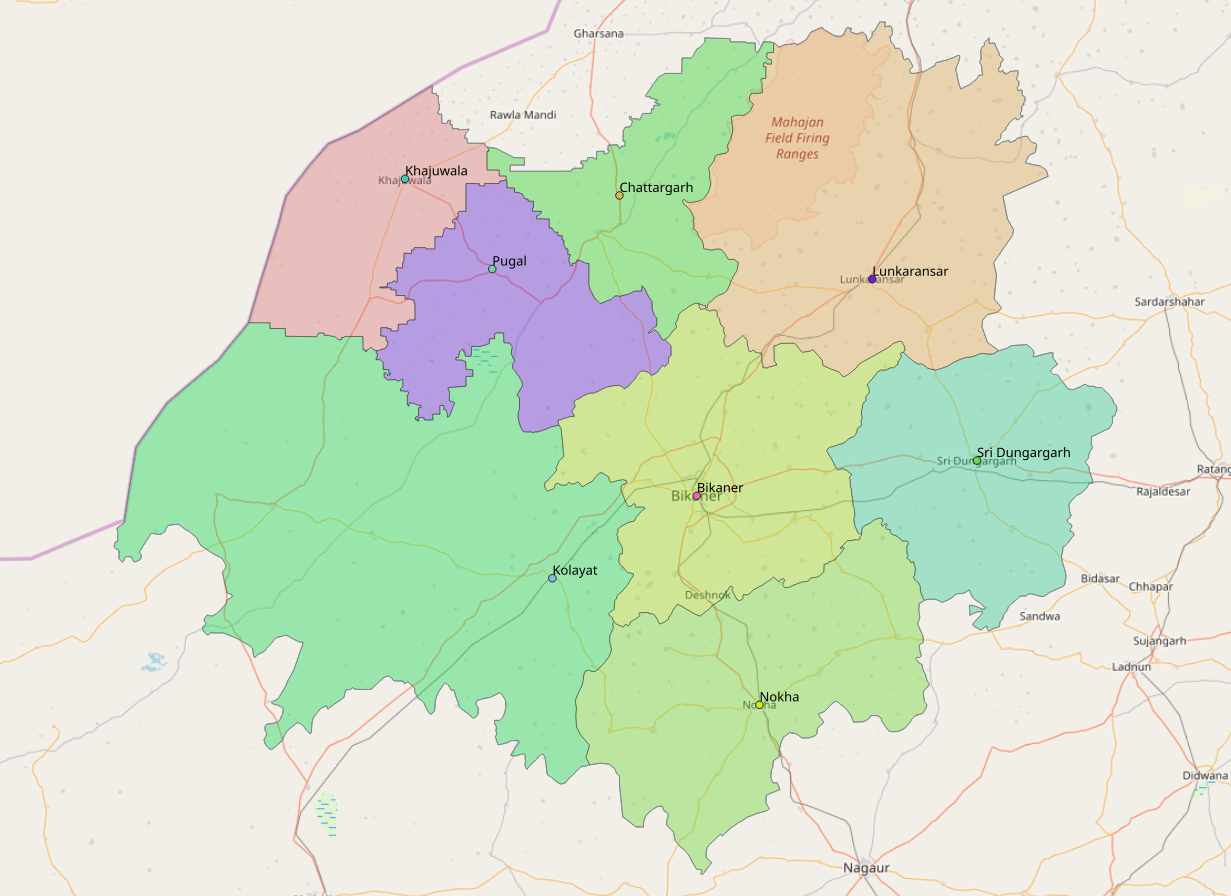
- Location within Bikaner District Location within Rajasthan Location within India
- Coordinates: 28.209041°N 73.78713°E
- Country: India
- State: Rajasthan
- District: Bikaner

Languages
  - Official: Hindi
- Time zone: UTC+5:30 (IST)
- ISO 3166 code: RJ-IN

Punrasar is a village in the Bikaner district of Rajasthan, Indian.

== Demographics ==
According to the 2011 Indian Census, Punrasar village has a population of 979, of which 500 are males and 479 are females.

== Geography ==
Punrasar is located at 28.209041°N 73.78713°E.

== Punrasar Balaji Temple ==
Punrasar Balaji is a famous holy site in the village dedicated to the Hindu deity Hanuman.
