= Punrasar Balaji Temple =

Temple of Hanuman in Rajasthan, India

Shri Punrasar Hanumanji
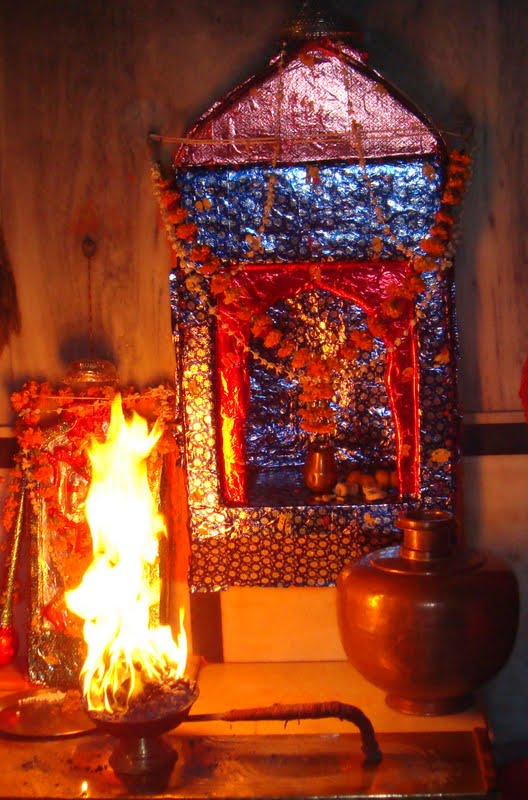

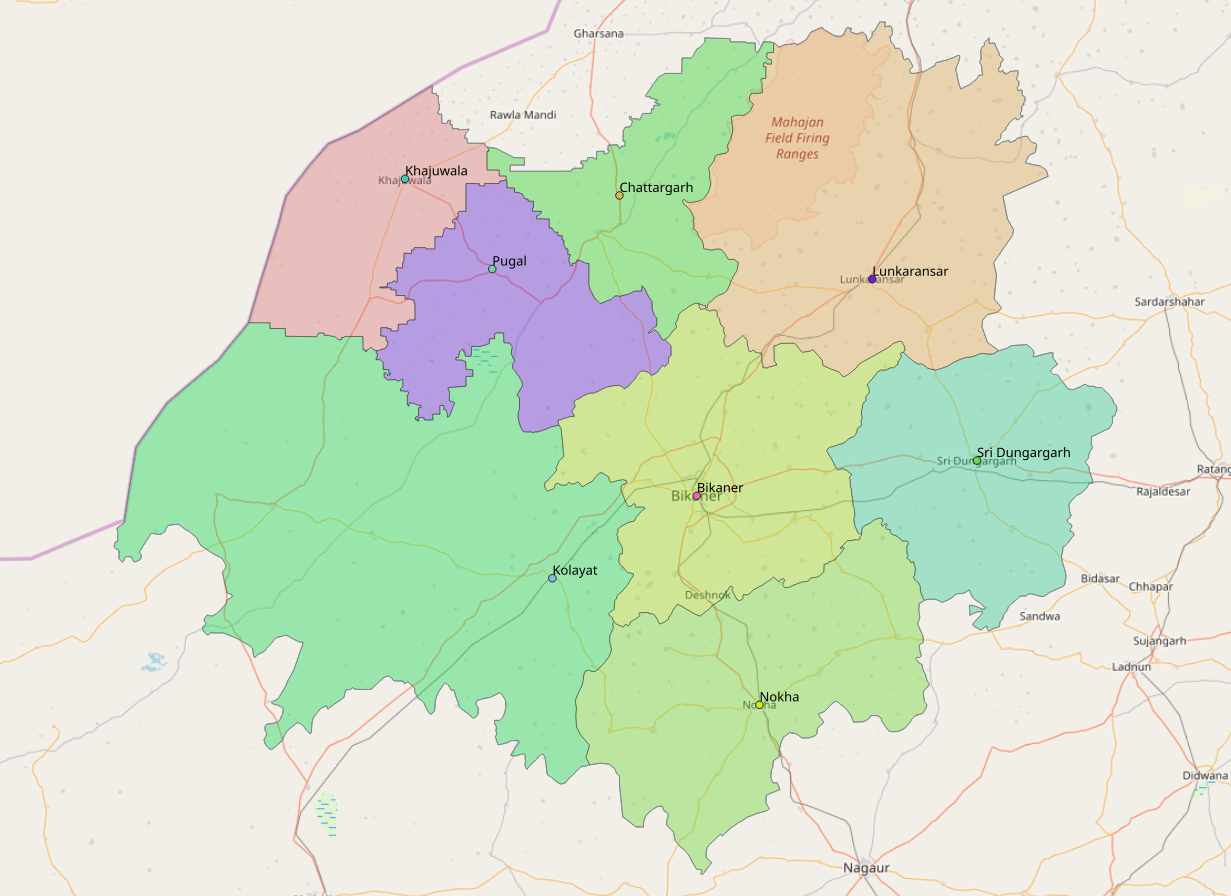
- Location within Bikaner District Location within Rajasthan

Religion
- Affiliation: Hinduism
- District: Bikaner
- Deity: Hanuman

Location
- Location: Punrasar
- State: Rajasthan
- Country: India
- Interactive map of Shri Punrasar Hanumanji
- Coordinates: 28.209041°N 73.787130°E

Architecture
- Established: 1718

Punrasar Balaji is a temple dedicated to the Hindu deity Hanuman in Rajasthan, India.

== Temple ==
Punrasar Balaji temple was established on Jaisth Sudhi Purnima of Vikram Samvat 1775. This place is surrounded by the sand dunes and is about 57 km away from Bikaner. Besides the main Nij Temple, there is also a statue of Hanumanji at the tree of Khejdi. At Khejdi, the ancient Hindu custom of Jhadula (cutting the hairs of new born children) takes place. Churma Prasadi, a sweet dish made up of wheat flour, butter and sugar is provided to the devotees of by the Pujari and his family members as the prasad. The prasad is first offered to Hanumanji for bhog and is then distributed to the devotees.

Three famous fairs are held every year in Punrasar. They take place on Chaitra Sudhi Purnima, Asoj Sudhi Purnima and the month of Bhadrapad each. There are many rooms situated in the temple premises which are available for the devotees at no cost. There also exists a newly constructed Dharamshala having A.C. and Non A.C. Rooms named Jairam Dharamshala. A Bhojnalaya(for food) is also running by Temple governing Body ( i.e. Mandir sri Punrasar Hanumanji Pujari Trust) at free of Cost which is famous for its delicious food.

== Location ==
Punrasar is a part of Bikaner district in Rajasthan and it is situated on the National Highway 11. It is 57 km away from Bikaner, 43 km from Shri Dungargarh and 15 km away from Seruna.

== History ==
According to local legend, during a severe famine in 1774, villagers left Punrasar in search of food and employment. Among them was Jairam Das Bothra, a member of the Jain Bothra Baniya community, who traveled to Punjab to procure grain. On his return journey, one of his camels' legs broke, leaving the animal unable to walk. Bothra convinced his companions to continue back to the village without him.

While sleeping, he was repeatedly awakened by a voice calling out to him, though he saw no one upon looking around. Seeking protection, Bothra prayed to Hanuman and requested that the speaker reveal themselves. Hanuman is said to have then appeared in the guise of a pandit, assuring Bothra that his hardships were over. The pandit directed him to a nearby statue of Hanuman, instructing him to bring it back to Punrasar and consecrate it there to ensure the village's prosperity. When Bothra pointed out that his injured camel prevented him from traveling, the pandit assured him the animal was healed; Bothra was astonished to find the camel completely recovered. He successfully brought the statue back to his village and established the temple. Per the deity's instructions, successive generations of the Bothra family have personally served as the temple's caretakers .
