= Balaji Temple, Ketkawla =

Balaji Temple, Ketkawle
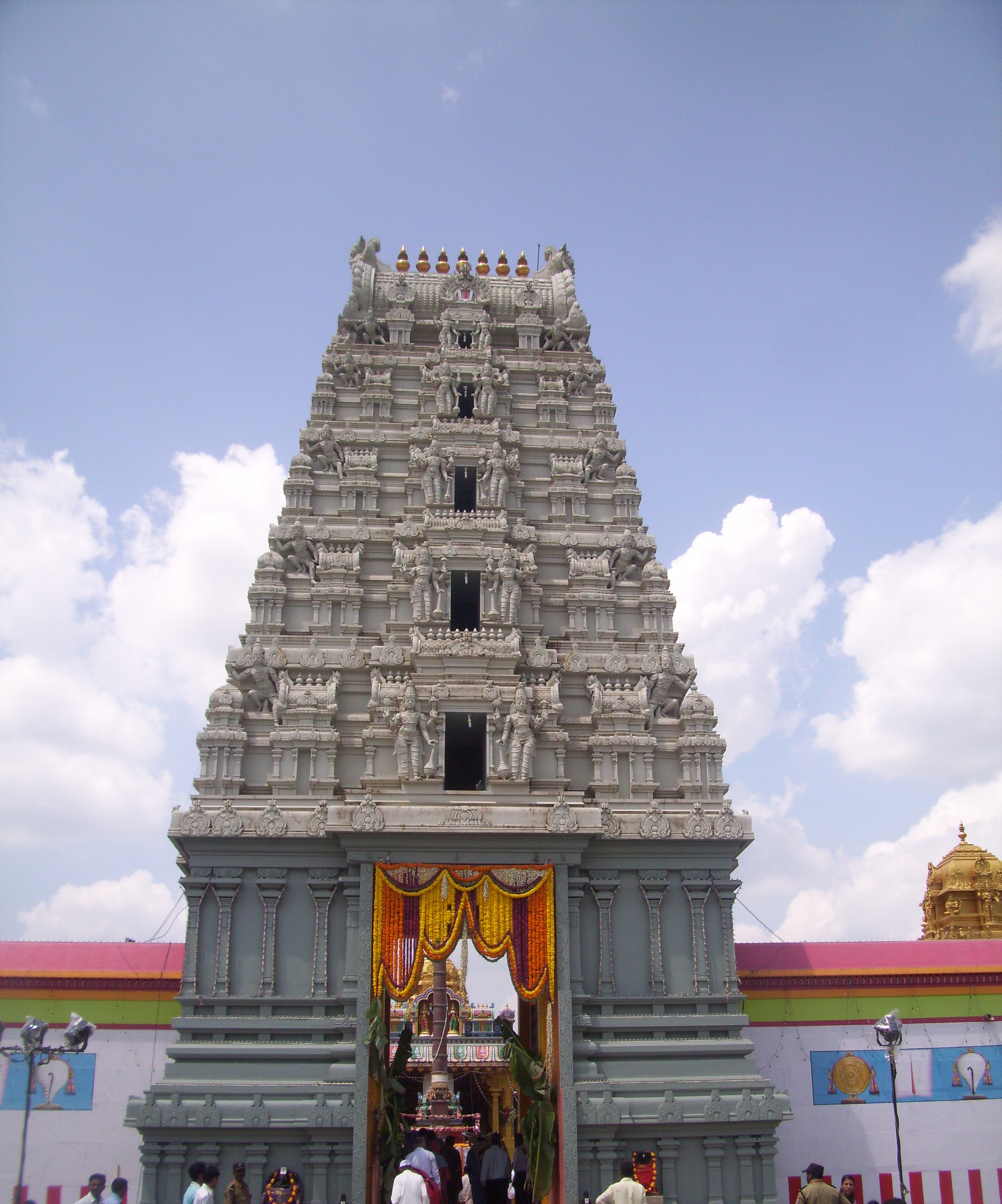

- Location in Maharashtra

Religion
- Affiliation: Hinduism
- District: Pune
- Deity: Balaji

Location
- Location: Ketkawale
- State: Maharashtra
- Country: India
- Interactive map of Balaji Temple, Ketkawle
- Coordinates: 18.256573°N 73.932640°E

Balaji Temple of Ketkawle, is copy of the original Tirumala Venkateswara Temple located 60 km from Pune, Maharashtra. It is on Pune-Bangalore highway.

== History ==
- This temple is a replica of the original Tirupati Temple located in Tirumala.
- Everything is perfect copy of the idol, Sanctorum, wood work, priests are abode of the Lord Venkateswara at Tirumala.
- The Venkateshwara charitable trust built the temple from 1996 to 2003.
- Created by the V H Group spending 27 Crore Rs.

== Infrastructure and architecture ==
The temple was built as a replica of the Tirumala Venkateswara Temple at Tirupati. It follows the style of traditional South Indian temple architecture. The main tower (gopuram) and sanctum are designed and looks similar to the original temple. The main idol of Lord Venkateswara is made of black granite and is about 9 feet tall, while the temple tower is around 30 feet high. The complex also has smaller shrines for other deities. The temple layout is planned to help visitors move easily and includes facilities to support religious activities.
