= Tulshi Dam =

Tulshi dam
- Location within Mumbai
- Official name: Tulshi dam D04951
- Location: Mumbai
- Coordinates: 19.1885788°N 72.9186201°E
- Opening date: 1879
- Owners: Government of Maharashtra, India

Dam and spillways
- Type of dam: Earthfill; Gravity
- Impounds: Tulshi river
- Height: 26 m (85 ft)
- Length: 186 m (610 ft)

Reservoir
- Total capacity: 10,273 km^{3} (2,465 cu mi)
- Surface area: 1,350 km^{2} (520 sq mi)

Tulshi dam, is an earthfill and gravity dam on Tulshi river in Mumbai near Mulund in the state of Maharashtra in India.

== Specifications ==
The height of the dam above its lowest foundation is 26 m (85 ft) while the length is 186 m (610 ft). The gross storage capacity is 10,429.00 km^{3} (2,502.05 cu mi).

== Purpose ==
- Drinking water
- Water supply

== See also ==
- Dams in Maharashtra
- List of reservoirs and dams in India
