= Lake Shore Mall (Thane) =

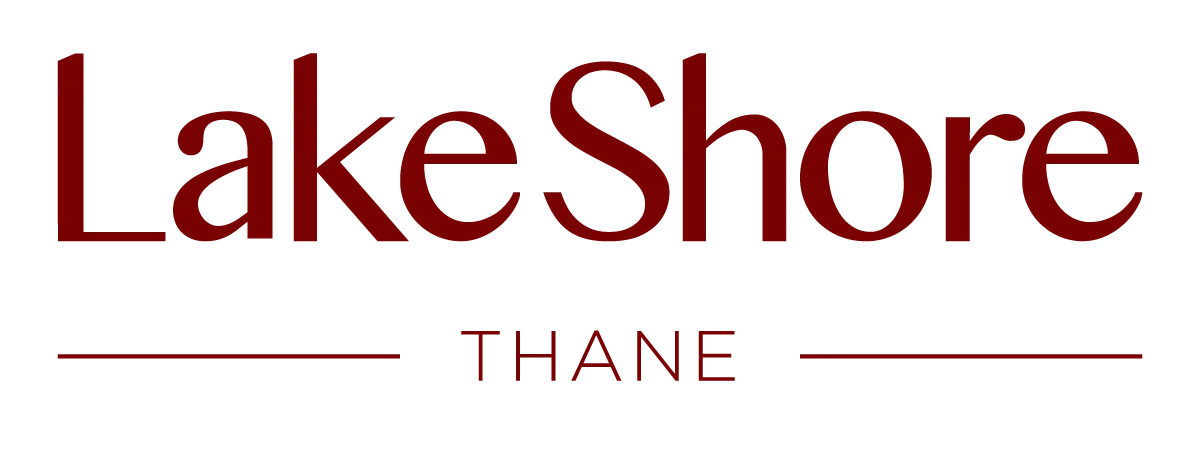
- Location: Thane, Maharashtra, India
- Coordinates: 19.2086°N 72.9717°E
- Opened: 2013
- Developer: Salsette Developers Private Limited
- Owner: Salsette Developers Private Limited
- Num. of stores: 250+
- Num. of anchor tenants: 20
- Floor area: 1,000,000 square feet (93,000 m^{2})
- Website: lakeshorethane.com

Lake Shore Mall, formerly Viviana Mall, is a shopping mall located in Thane West, Thane, Maharashtra. Located on the Eastern Express Highway, it is well-connected with all areas of the city. It has a wide range of retail and entertainment outlets at the mall. Built on a 13-acre plot and spread over an area of 1.7 million sq ft, the mall has a leasable area of approx 1 million sq ft and also (Cinépolis) movie theatre. The mall has The Game Palacio, an arcade open for everyone to play in. The mall has over 250 stores which comprises 19 large and mini anchors tenants.

== Features ==
It is strategically located to cater to the catchments area of Thane, Mulund, Powai, Ghatkopar and other central suburbs of Mumbai. The mall is also easily accessible via Powai to the western suburbs of Mumbai. The mall also has a 900 KVA rooftop solar power plant built on its rooftop. This initiative has made it the first mall to generate 91,000 watts monthly through solar energy. It has over 250 leading brands in its prime retail and leisure space. The mall is India's first and only visually-impaired friendly mall and has launched "XRCVC-Viviana Extension" a resource centre for the visually impaired.

== Specialists ==
The mall has more than 250 stores, including 20 anchor tenants.

It has one of the largest multiplexes in India with Cinepolis, a megaplex with 14 screens, along with an arcade and play area called Funcity.

== Awards ==
The mall has been named ‘The Best Retail Project of 2014’ across Mumbai Metropolitan Region (MMR) in an event held at Taj Palace, New Delhi.

In the same year, the mall also received two awards at the Asia Real Estate Awards 2014 namely ‘Retailer of the Year Award’ and ‘Impactful Design and Visual Merchandise Award’.
