= Shree Balaji Mandir =

Temple in India

Shree Balaji Mandir is a temple at Charkop, Kandivali, India. It was constructed in 2011.
