= Raghuleela Mall, Kandivali =

Raghuleela Mega Mall
- Location: West Kandivali, Mumbai, India
- Coordinates: 19.213467°N 72.849128°E
- Address: Behind Poisar Depot
- Opened: 2009
- Developer: Wadhwa group
- Num. of stores: 800
- Floor area: 400,000 sq ft (37,000 m^{2})
- Floors: 4
- Website: raghuleelamegamall.in

Raghuleela Mega Mall is a mall in Kandivali, a suburb of Mumbai. Developed by Raghuleela Properties Pvt. Ltd., the mall has a gross leasable area of 400,000 sq ft (37,000 m^{2}) on four floors and more than 800 shops. Raghuleela Mega Mall is one of the most popular malls strategically located between Borivali & Kandivali in Mumbai. The mall was developed by the Vijay Associates (Wadhwa). The mall is centrally air-conditioned and includes twelve imported escalators and two capsule lifts.

The mall has an INOX multiplex theatre on the second floor which has four auditoriums including 3D silver screens that can accommodate 1275 seats in all.

== Numismatic Showroom - Coins & Currency Shop ==
' SNS Coins Investment Gallery is on the 2nd floor. Gp 8A - 2nd Floor Raghuleelaa Mega Mall Kandivali west Mumbai India

Dealing in Old Coins & Currency snscoins.in

== Attached play park ==
The mall's 12,000 sq ft (1,100 m^{2}) play park, Jungle Kingdom, is on the third floor. There is also a bowling alley, video game section, and Dashing Cars Joint.

== See also ==
- Raghuleela Mall, Vashi
