= Nashik =

City in Maharashtra, India

Nashik Nāśika (Marathi) Nasik
- Metropolis
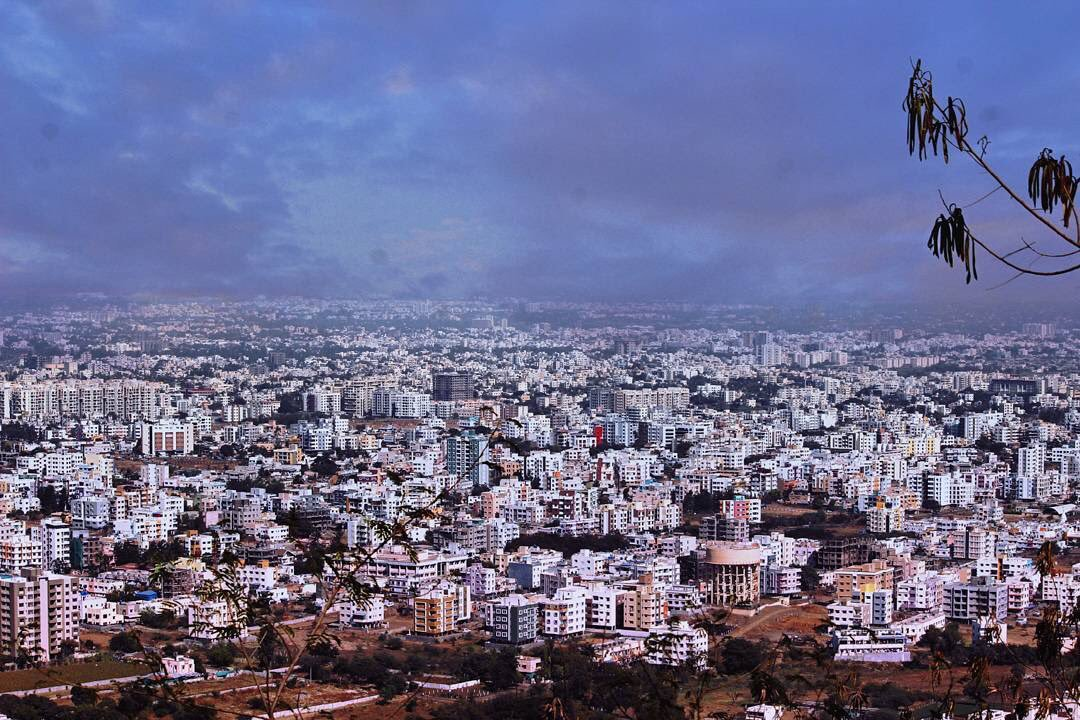
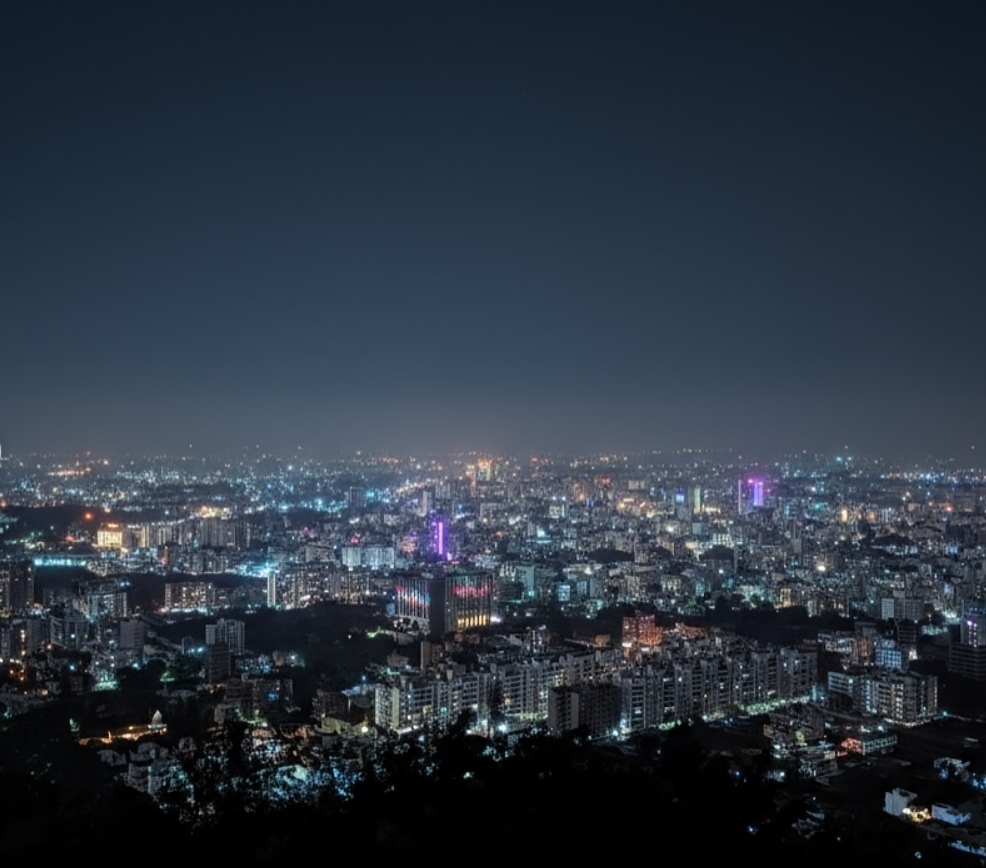
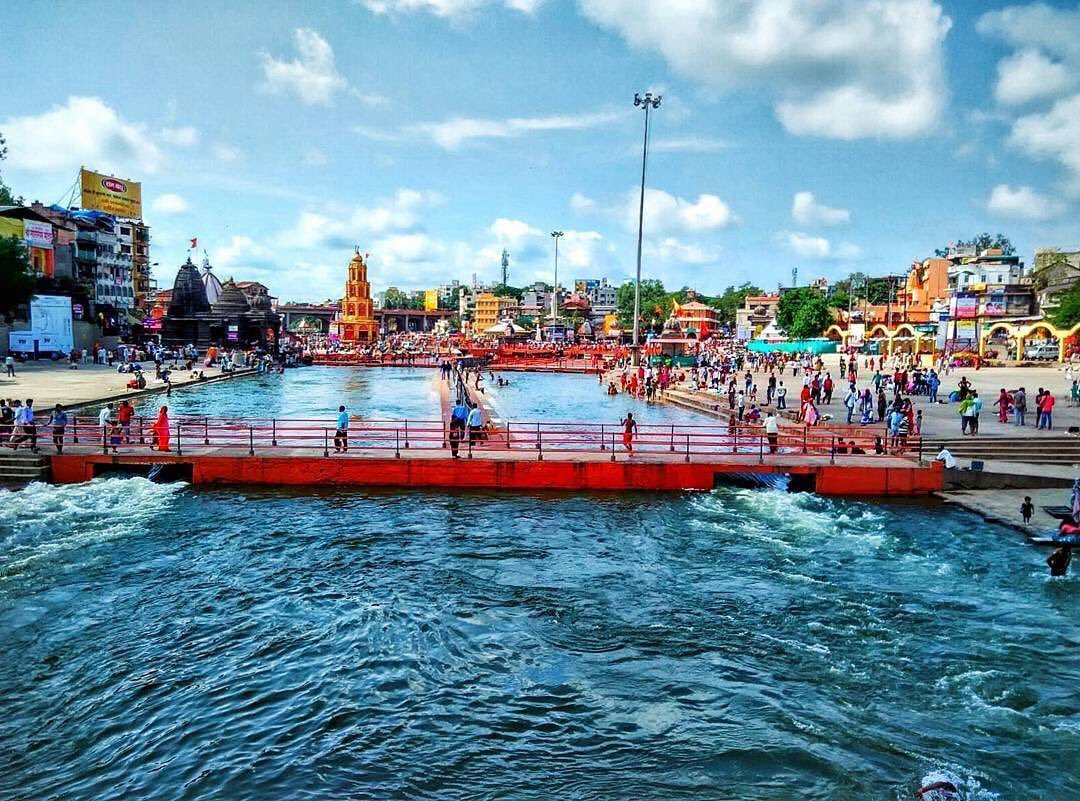
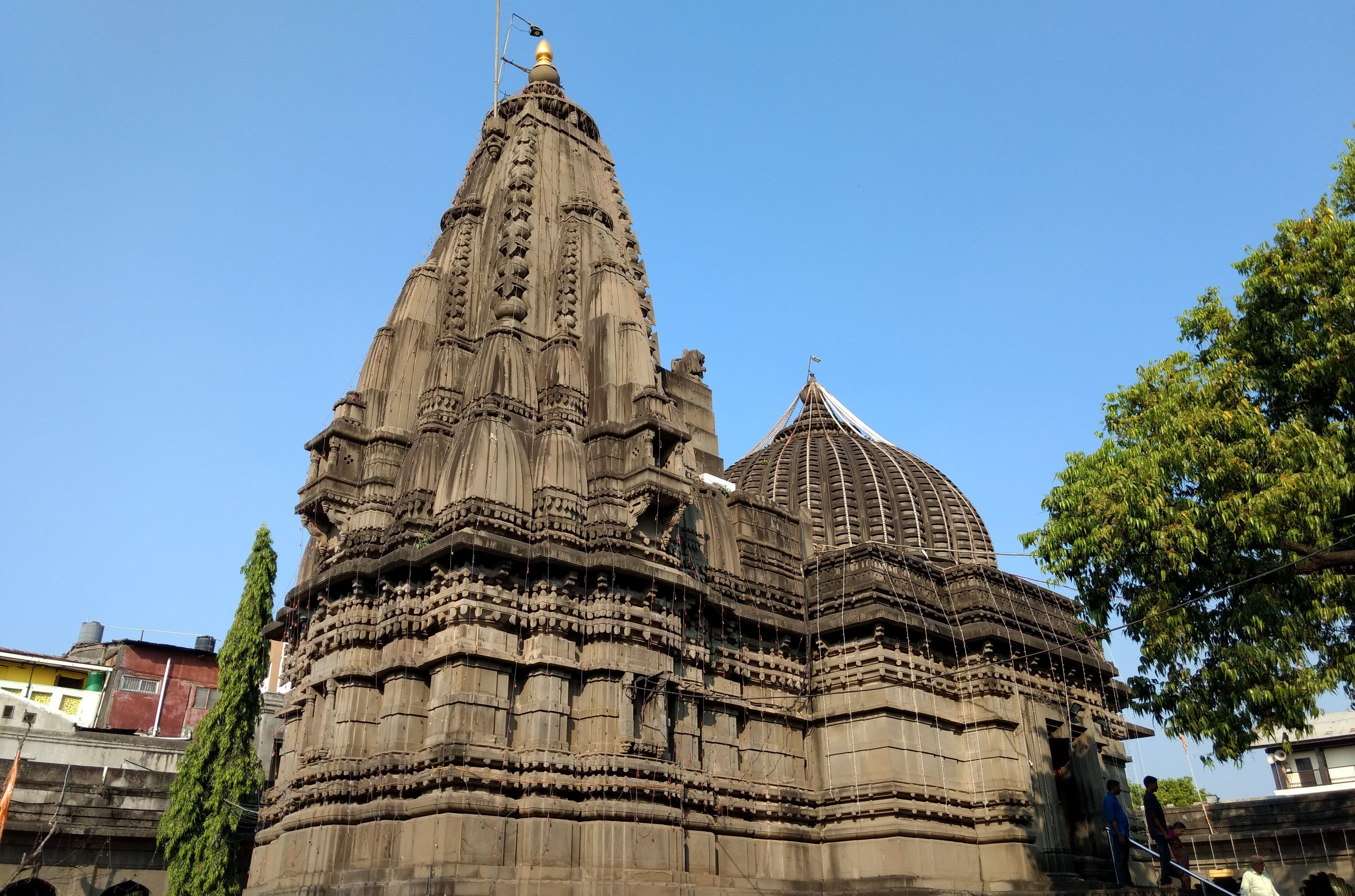
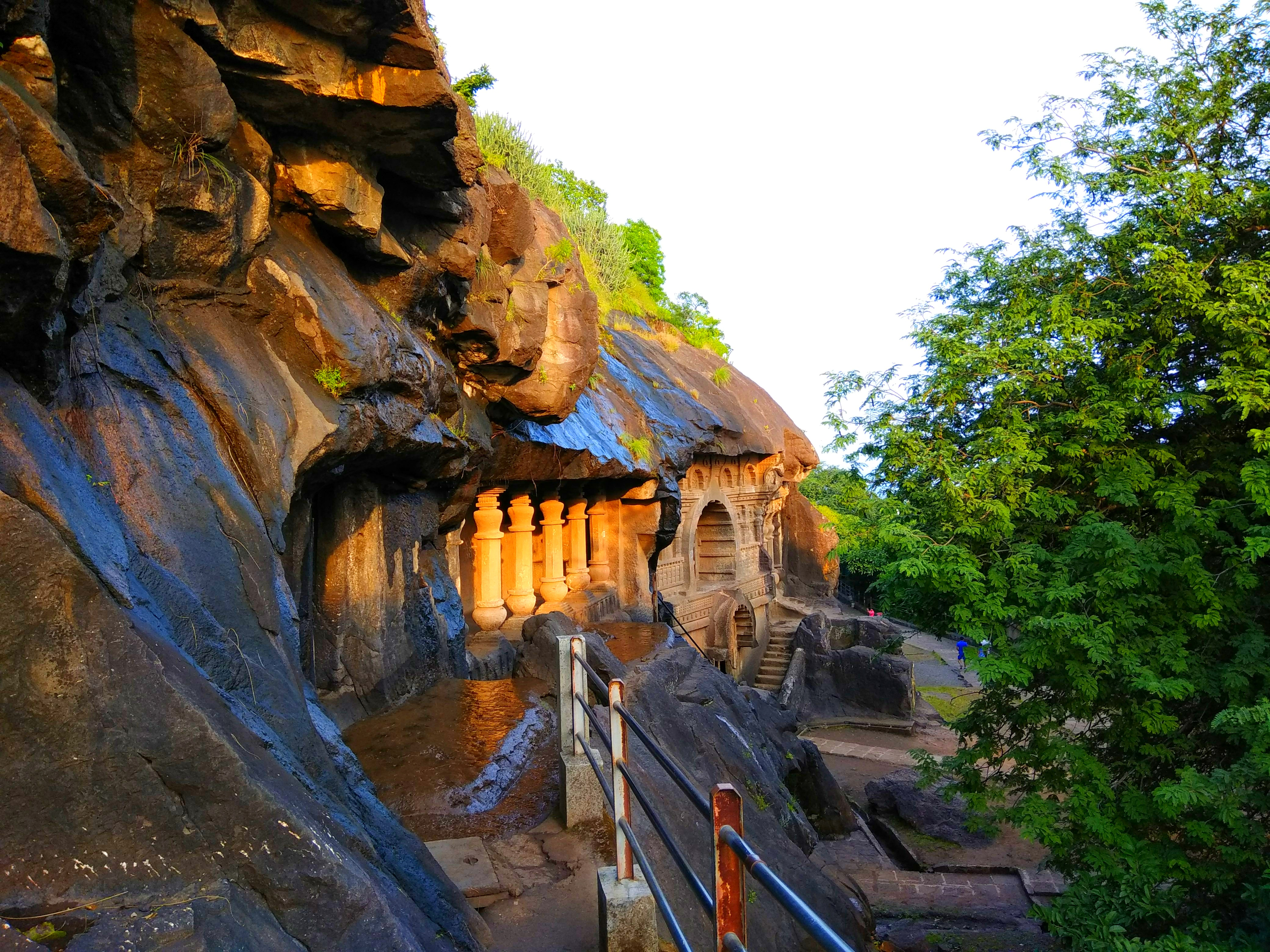
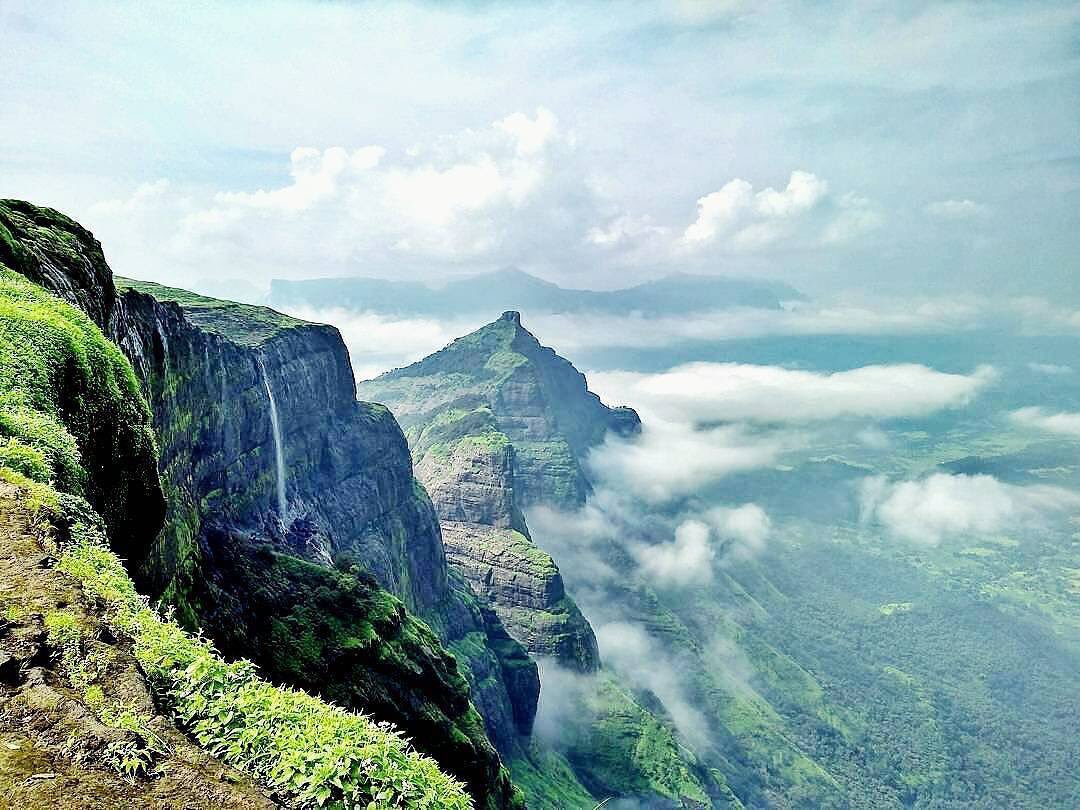
- Clockwise from top: Nashik City skyline, Nashik City at Night, Kalaram Temple, View of Nashik mountains, Pandavleni Caves, and Godavari Ghat
- Nickname: Wine Capital of India
- Location of Nashik in Maharashtra
- Coordinates: 19°59′51.0″N 73°47′23.3″E
- Country: India
- State: Maharashtra
- District: Nashik
- Division: Nashik

Government
  - Type: Municipal Corporation
  - Body: Nashik Municipal Corporation
  - Mayor: Himgauri Aher (BJP)
  - Guardian Minister: Girish Mahajan
  - Municipal Commissioner and Administrator: Ashok Karanjkar
  - District Magistrate and Collector: Ayush Prasad, IAS
  - Member of Parliament: Rajabhau Waje (Shiv Sena (UBT))

Area
  - Metropolis: 267 km^{2} (103 sq mi)
- Elevation: 602.48 m (1,976.6 ft)
- Highest elevation (at Salher Peak): 1,567 m (5,141 ft)

Population (2011)
  - Metropolis: 1,486,053
  - Density: 5,570/km^{2} (14,400/sq mi)
  - Metro: 1,562,769
  - Metro rank: India: 29th
- Demonym(s): Nashikkar, Nashikites

Language
  - Official: Marathi
- Time zone: UTC+5:30 (IST)
- PIN: 422 001
- Telephone code: 91(253)
- Vehicle registration: MH-15 (Nashik City), MH-41(Malegaon)
- Nominal GDP (Nashik District): ₹195,406 crore (US$21 billion) (2023-24)
- Sex ratio: 894 ♀ / 1000 ♂
- HDI: ▲0.746 (high)
- Literacy: 89.85%
- Website: nashik.gov.in nmc.gov.in nashikmrda.in

Nashik, (Note: /ˈnɑːʃɪk/; Marathi: [naːʃik];) formerly Nasik, is a city in the northern region of the Indian state of Maharashtra situated on the banks of the river Godavari, about 165 km (103 mi) northeast of the state capital Mumbai. The city lies in the Nashik Metropolitan Region. It is the administrative headquarters of Nashik district. Nashik is the 4th largest city in Maharashtra after Mumbai, Pune and Nagpur, and the largest city in Northern Maharashtra. It is also one of the fastest developing Tier-2 cities in India.

Nashik is one of the Hindu pilgrimage sites of the Kumbh Mela, which is held every 12 years.

According to the Ramayana, Nashik is where Lakshmana cut off the nose of the demoness Surpanakha on the banks of the Godavari River. It is also called Panchavati. It was known as "Gulshanabad" during the Mughal period.

== History ==
=== Mythology ===
Nashik was known as "Padmanagar" during the Satya Yuga, "Trikantak" during the Treta Yuga, "Janasthana" during the Dvapara Yuga, and finally "Navashikh" or "Nashik" during the Kali Yuga, according to Hindu traditions. Nashik is significant in history, social life, and culture. The city is located on the banks of the Godavari River, making it a sacred site for Hindus around the world. During his 14-year exile from Ayodhya, Rama, the king of Ayodhya, is said to have made Nashik his home.

According to Hindu tradition, Nashik is associated with the epic Ramayana: it is the place where Lakshmana severed the nose of the demoness Shurpanakha on the banks of the Godavari River during the 14-year exile of Rama, Sita, and Lakshmana. The area around Panchavati is considered sacred and features several temples and holy sites.

=== Nashik Tram ===
The Nashik Tram was started from the Old Municipal Building on the main road to Nashik Road railway station around 1889. The tram served the people of Nashik for almost 44 years. The tram station was at the Main Road, and the tram reached the Nashik Road railway station via the present Main Road, Bhadrakali Market, Ghasbazar, and Phalke Road. It covered a distance of about eight to ten kilometres, and the stretch used to be covered with dense jungle at the time. In the article 'Nashik-then', poet Kusumagraj wrote: "If the carriages were full, the tram would leave. It would ring the bell and drive out of the village to the main road and then to the grass market.

=== Revolutionary activities ===
In the 1900s, the Hindu nationalist Vinayak Damodar Savarkar along with his brother, founded a secret society named Abhinav Bharat in Nasik under the name "Mitra Mela" which was one among many in Maharashtra. On 21 December 1909, Anant Kanhere, a Abhinav Bharat member and student from Aurangabad, assassinated Nashik's governor A. M. T. Jackson while he was watching a play in a theatre. Kanhere was arrested on the spot, and after investigation, police arrested Vinayak Savarkar and others for conspiring against the government to instigate an armed rebellion. The case was known as the "Nasik Conspiracy Case - 1910".

In 1930, the Nashik Satyagraha was launched under the leadership of B. R. Ambedkar for the entry of Dalits in Kalaram Mandir. In 1931, a meeting of the Bombay Province Charmakar Parishad was organised in Nashik to work out the Chambhars' position concerning the Second Round Table Conference in which Ambedkar was going to participate. In 1932, he organised his temple entry movement for the abolition of untouchability in Nashik.

== Geography ==
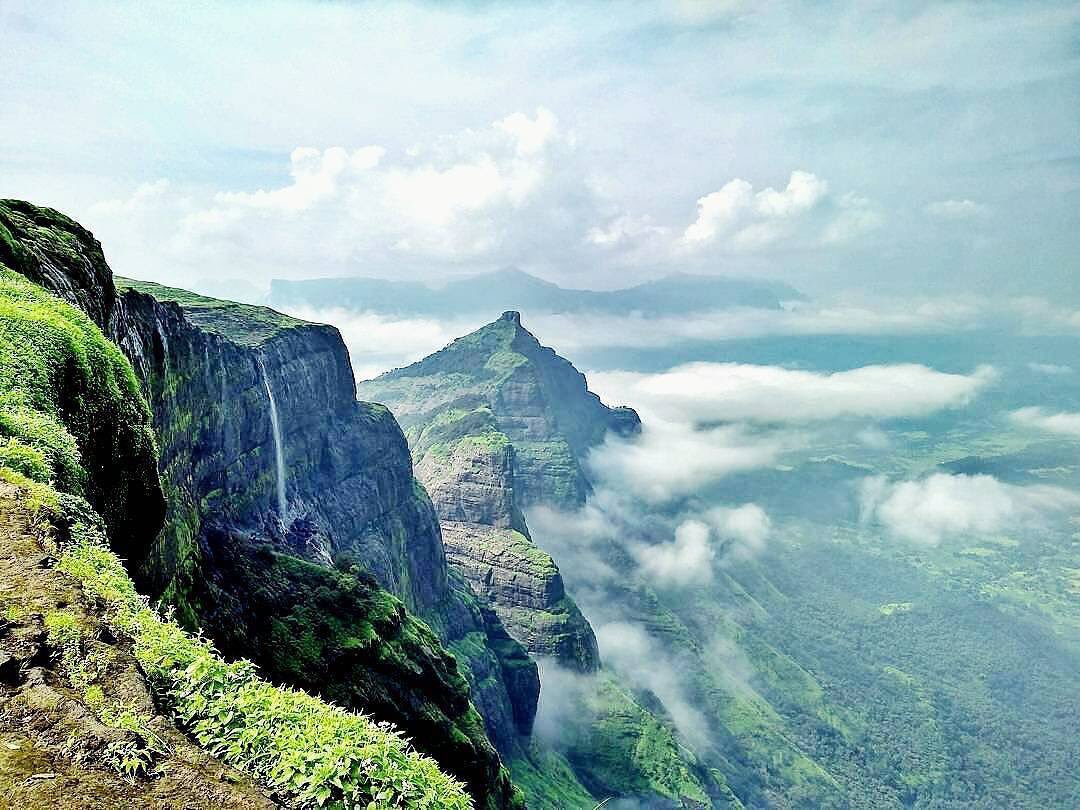
Nashik has lush mountainous terrain

Nashik lies in the northern part of Maharashtra state, 584 m (1,916 ft) from the mean sea level.

The river Godavari originates from the Brahmagiri Mountain, Trimbakeshwar, about 24 km (15 mi) from Nashik, and flows through the old residential settlement, now in the central part of the city. Due to the high pollution created by factories in proximity to the city, the river was dying at an alarming rate. It has since been successfully cleaned.

Nashik lies on the western edge of the Deccan Plateau, an ancient volcanic formation.

Trimbakeshwar is about 30 km (19 mi) from the city, it is where from river Godavari originates. The land area of the city is about 259.13 km^{2} (100.05 sq mi).

=== Climate ===
The city's tropical location and high altitude combine to give it a relatively mild version of a tropical wet and dry climate (Köppen Aw). Temperatures rise slightly in October, but this is followed by the cool season from November to February. The cool season sees warm temperatures of around 28 °C or 82.4 °F during the day, but cool nights, with lows averaging 10 °C or 50 °F, and extremely dry air.

Climate data for Nashik (Ozar Airport) 1991–2020, extremes 1965–present
Month	Jan	Feb	Mar	Apr	May	Jun	Jul	Aug	Sep	Oct	Nov	Dec	Year
Record high °C (°F)	40.2 (104.4)	38.6 (101.5)	40.4 (104.7)	42.8 (109.0)	44.8 (112.6)	43.3 (109.9)	35.4 (95.7)	34.3 (93.7)	36.5 (97.7)	38.5 (101.3)	44.0 (111.2)	44.4 (111.9)	44.8 (112.6)
Mean daily maximum °C (°F)	29.0 (84.2)	31.5 (88.7)	34.9 (94.8)	37.6 (99.7)	37.4 (99.3)	32.1 (89.8)	28.0 (82.4)	27.6 (81.7)	29.1 (84.4)	31.7 (89.1)	30.6 (87.1)	29.4 (84.9)	31.6 (88.9)
Mean daily minimum °C (°F)	10.4 (50.7)	12.6 (54.7)	16.2 (61.2)	20.0 (68.0)	22.4 (72.3)	23.2 (73.8)	22.3 (72.1)	21.6 (70.9)	21.2 (70.2)	18.6 (65.5)	14.7 (58.5)	11.8 (53.2)	17.8 (64.0)
Record low °C (°F)	0.4 (32.7)	0.6 (33.1)	5.7 (42.3)	8.8 (47.8)	13.5 (56.3)	18.3 (64.9)	17.0 (62.6)	17.0 (62.6)	13.5 (56.3)	9.8 (49.6)	4.4 (39.9)	2.2 (36.0)	0.4 (32.7)
Average rainfall mm (inches)	0.6 (0.02)	3.2 (0.13)	7.5 (0.30)	1.1 (0.04)	10.2 (0.40)	120.1 (4.73)	240.6 (9.47)	196.5 (7.74)	169.4 (6.67)	68.0 (2.68)	26.2 (1.03)	2.3 (0.09)	845.9 (33.30)
Average rainy days	0.1	0.1	0.7	0.1	1.1	6.6	14.4	12.5	10.0	4.5	1.7	0.3	52.0
Average relative humidity (%) (at 17:30 IST)	32	25	20	20	30	64	81	82	78	54	44	39	47
Source: India Meteorological Department

Nashik has been ranked 19th in the "National Clean Air City" (under Category >10L Population cities) rankings according to 'Swachh Vayu Survekshan 2024 Results'

== Demographics ==
Religions in Nashik City (2011)
Religion	Percent
Hinduism	85.21%
Islam	8.91%
Buddhism	3.18%
Jainism	1.10%
Christianity	1.00%
Other or not stated	0.60%

Nashik is the fourth largest city in Maharashtra in terms of population after Mumbai, Pune, and Nagpur. According to the Census of India, 2011, Nashik had a population of 1,486,053. Males are 782,517 in number and females 703,536. The Metropolitan Nashik population was 1,561,809, of which 821,921 were males and 739,888 were females. Nashik city had an average literacy rate of 89.85%: male literacy was 93.40%, and female literacy was 85.92%.

The sex ratio is 894 per 1,000 males for Nashik city. The child sex ratio is 865 girls per 1,000 boys. 11.42% of the population is under 6 years of age. In the census year 2001, the Nashik Urban Agglomeration had a population of 1,152,326. Thus, it was the fourth largest urban area in Maharashtra after Mumbai, Pune and Nagpur. The projected population of Nashik urban agglomeration (which includes abutting urban areas like Deolali) as of 11 November 2012 is 1,562,769.

Language in Nashik City (2011)
1. Marathi (76.7%)
2. Hindi (11.8%)
3. Urdu (3.26%)
4. Gujarati (2.16%)
5. Marwari (1.26%)
6. Others (4.83%)

At the time of the 2011 census, 76.69% of the population spoke Marathi, 11.80% Hindi, 3.26% Urdu, 2.16% Gujarati and 1.26% Marwari as their first language.

== Governance and politics ==
=== Civic administration ===
Nashik city is governed by the Nashik Municipal Corporation. Nashik is the district headquarters of the Nashik District, 185 km (115 mi) away from Mumbai. The city has developed on both banks of the Godavari, which divides the city into almost equal halves.

The ward committee consists of councillors representing the electoral wards within the territorial area of the ward committee. There are six ward committees namely Nashik (E), Nashik (W), Nashik Road, Panchavati, CIDCO and Satpur. The main function of the committees is to approve the cost of works for the wards, incorporate the expenses in the budget among others.

=== Municipal finance ===
According to financial data published on the CityFinance Portal of the Ministry of Housing and Urban Affairs, the Nashik Municipal Corporation reported total revenue receipts of ₹1,996 crore (US$240 million) and total expenditure of ₹1,345 crore (US$162 million) in 2022–23. Tax revenue accounted for about 15.9% of the total revenue, while the corporation received ₹1,194 crore in grants during the financial year.

=== Civic services ===
The Nashik Municipal Corporation (NMC) is planning to start major civic projects in 2020. The municipal corporation will prioritise new smart roads, 800 CCTVs, and LED streetlights. It will also implement a smart parking system and the Goda beautification project. For water infrastructure, two new water treatment plants will be built and existing sewage treatment plants will be upgraded.

==== Solid waste management ====
In the Nashik Municipal Corporation area about 225 MT of solid waste is generated per day. Unlike other Indian cities, this garbage is collected by vehicles titled 'Ghantagadi' (meaning the vehicle with a bell): a system which has resulted in smaller versions of the ghantagadi plying in the congested old city areas. A plant has been set by the Nashik Municipal Corporation near Pandavleni Caves to process the garbage and convert it into compost.

==== Digital services ====
The NMC provides an online website for various civic services like birth certificate registration, medical services, taxes, development services, etc.

== Economy ==
=== Agriculture ===
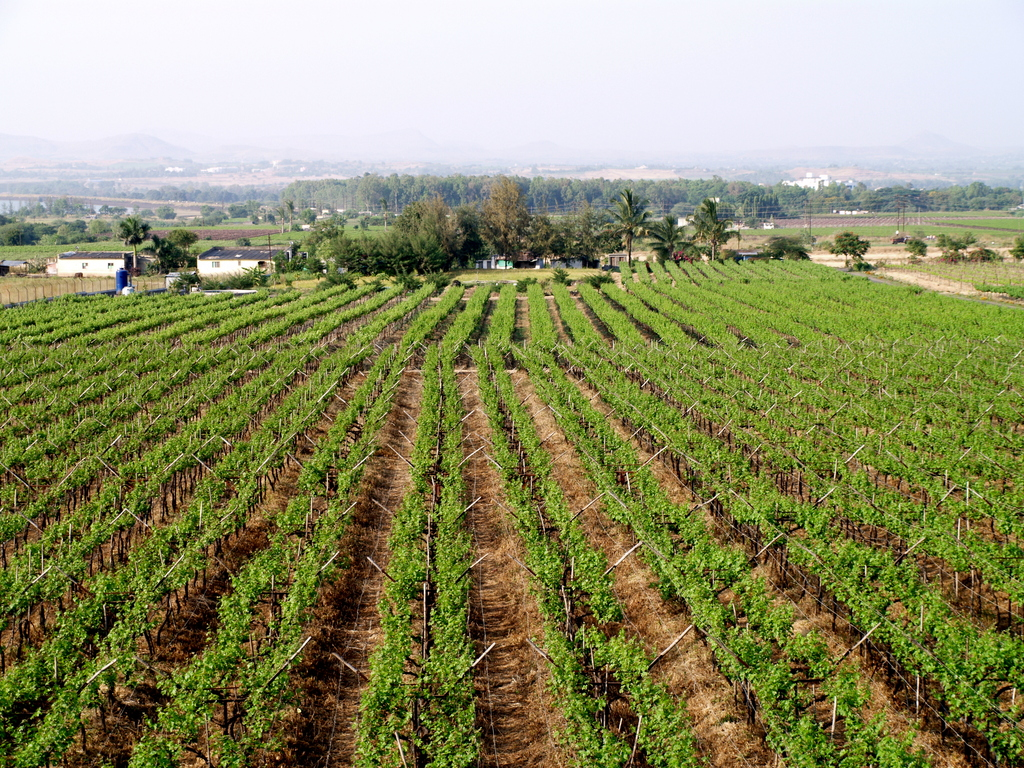
A grape vineyard in Nashik.

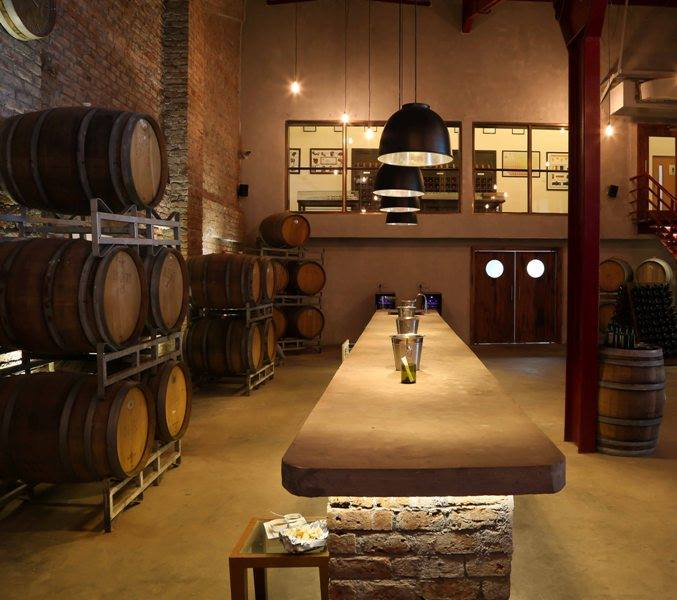
Tasting cellar at Sula Vineyards

In early 1925, the table grape revolution was started in Ozar, a small town near Nashik, by Raosaheb Jairam Krishna Gaikwad. Today, table grapes are exported to Europe, the Middle East, and Asia.

The total cultivatible area in Nashik district is 864,000 hectares, of which the average Kharif crop area is 663,200 hectares, and the average Rabbi crop area is 136,500 hectares. The sown area is 658,763 hectares (99%) and the forest land is 340,000 hectares (21.75%). The uncultivable area is 23,000 hectares (1.48%).

=== Industry ===
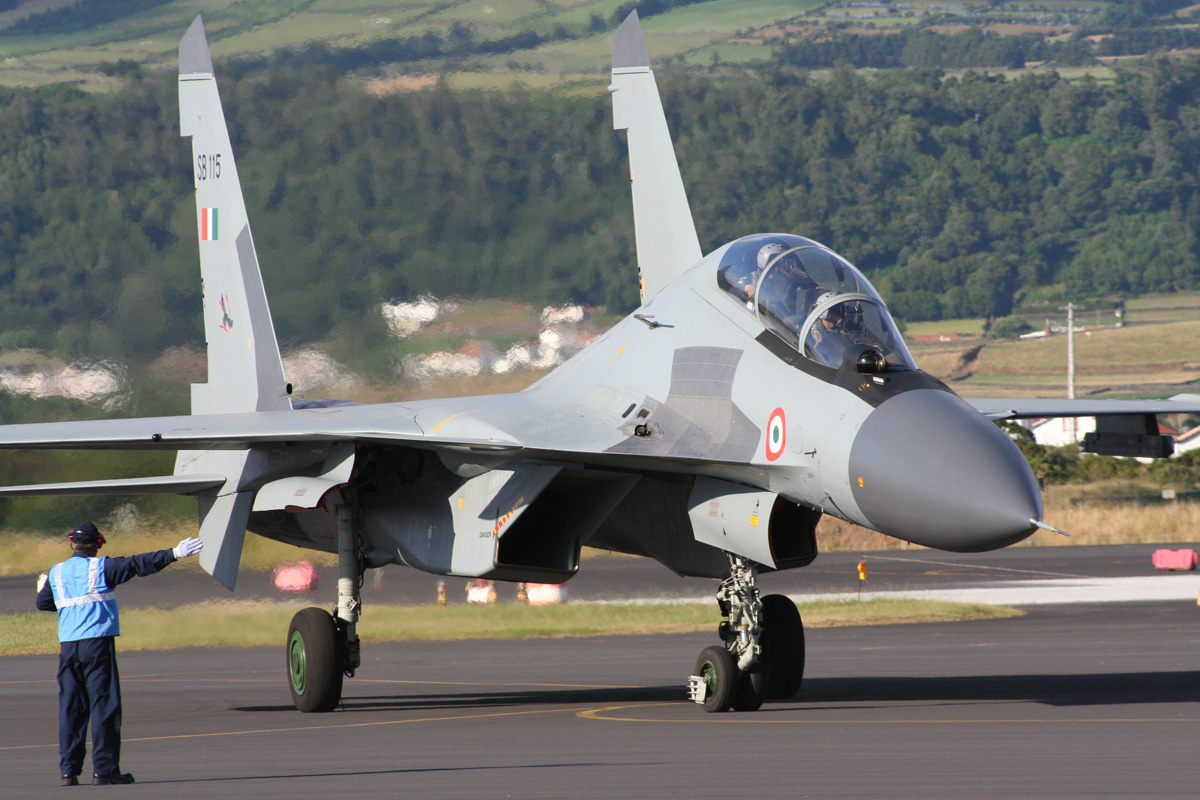
Sukhoi Su-30MKI is manufactured at Hindustan Aeronautics Limited plant in Nashik

The Igatpuri-Nashik-Sinnar investment region is an important node in the US$90billion Delhi Mumbai Industrial Corridor Project.

Nashik is a defence and aerospace manufacturing hub. Hindustan Aeronautics Limited has an aircraft manufacturing plant located in Ozar, where aircraft for the Indian Air Force are manufactured and overhauled. The Currency Note Press and India Security Press are on Nashik Road, where Indian currency and government stamp papers are printed respectively.

Industrial areas in Nashik district are Satpur, Ambad, Sinnar, Igatpuri, Dindori and Vinchur. The proposed additional areas are Sinnar, Malegaon and Rajur Bahula.

Industries in Nashik district include Atlas Copco, Robert Bosch GmbH, CEAT Limited, Crompton Greaves, ThyssenKrupp, Epcos, Everest Industries, GlaxoSmithKline, Hindustan Unilever Limited, Kirloskar Group, Dabur, KSB Pumps, Larsen & Toubro, Mahindra and Mahindra, United Spirits Limited, Mahindra Ugine Steel, Samsonite, Shalimar Paints, Siemens, VIP Industries, and Indian Oil Corporation.

Apart from manufacturing, Nashik is an emerging investment destination for Information Technology companies. Tata Consultancy Services has invested in Nashik under the Government of India's BPO promotion scheme (IBPS). WNS, Accenture and TCS have set up Digital Impact Square, or DISQ, a social innovation centre.

Nashik has a textile industry. National Bank for Agriculture and Rural Development has selected Yeola Block for development of Paithani Cluster. To facilitate exports, a container freight station was started at MIDC Ambad by the Central Government.

==== Wine industry ====
Nashik has been described as "The Wine Capital of India". The Nashik region reportedly produced 10,000 tonnes of grapes per year.

In 2013, there were 22 wineries in Nashik, out of 46 wineries throughout India. The largest vineyard in Nashik is the Sula Vineyards.

In the harvest season, Nashik is home to several wine festivals, such as the India Grape Harvest and SulaFest.

== Culture and cityscape ==
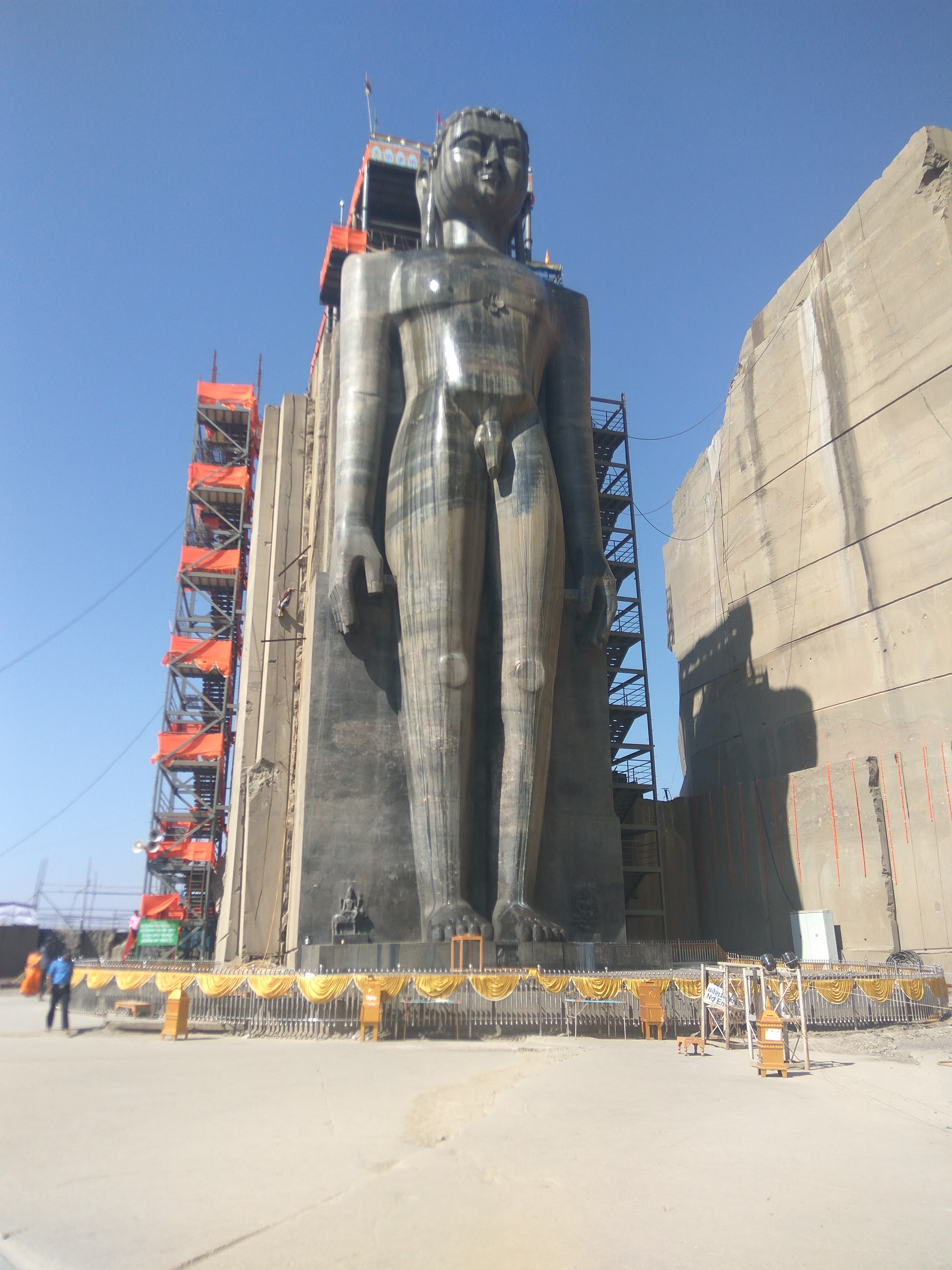
108 feet Rishabdev Bhagwan at Mangi Tungi

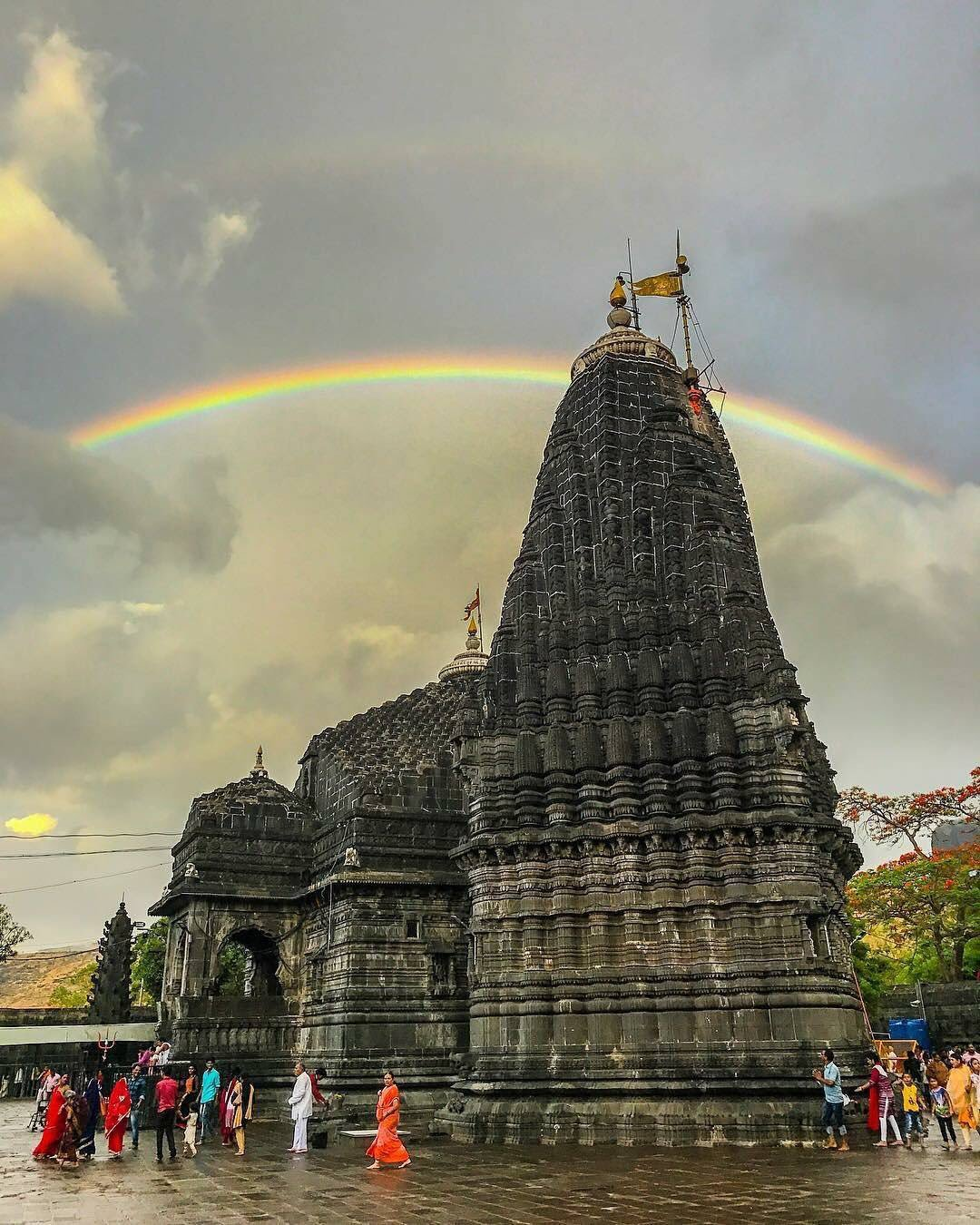
Trimbakeshwar Temple near Nashik

In February 2016, The Statue of Ahimsa, a 108 ft (33 m) idol of the first Jain tirthankara Rishabhdev carved in monolithic stone was consecrated at Mangi Tungi nearly 122 km (76 mi) from Nashik city. It is recorded in the Guinness Book of World Records as the tallest Jain idol in the world.

=== Trirashmi Caves ===
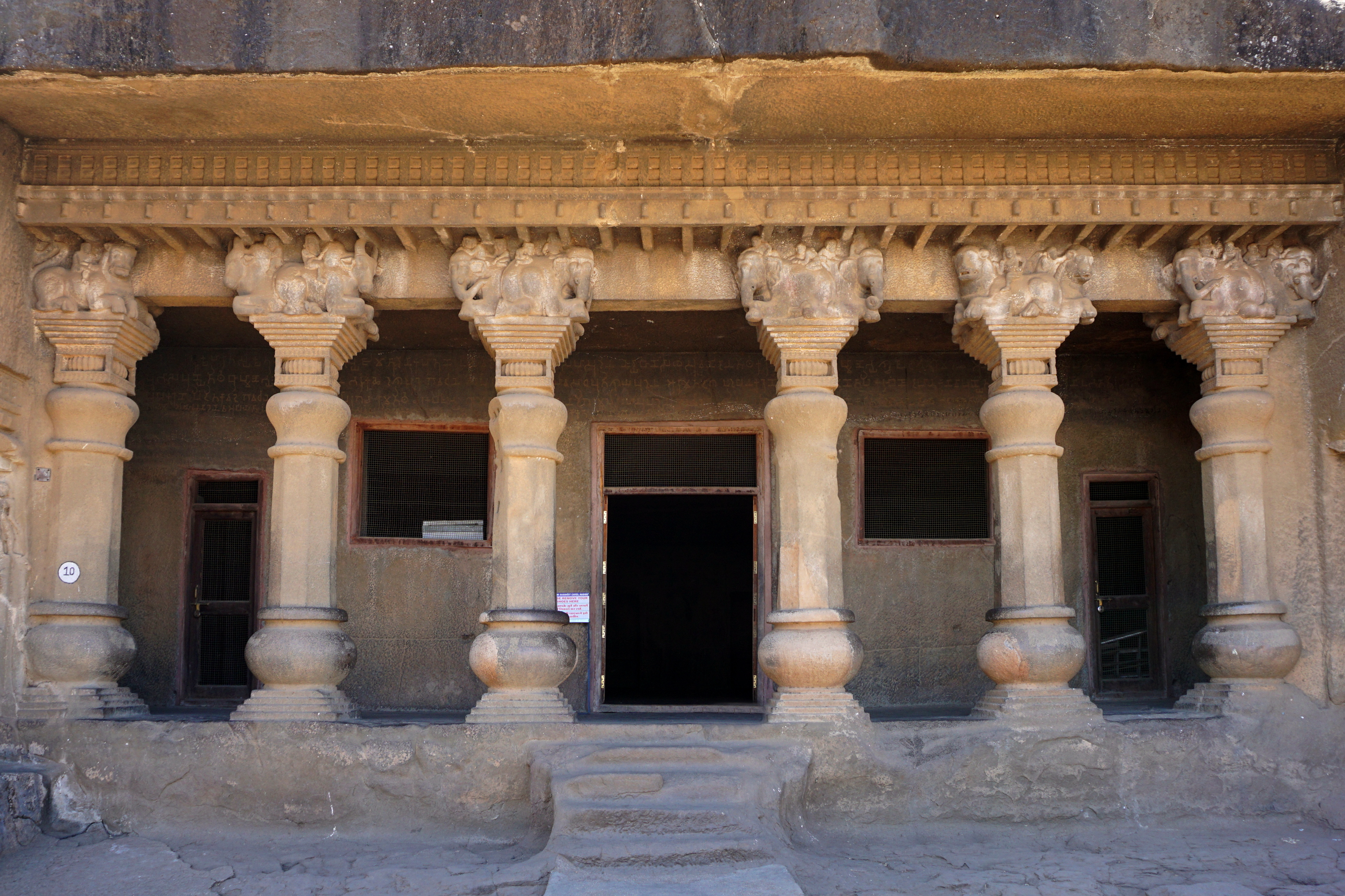
Cave No.10 "Nahapana Vihara" at Pandavleni Caves, (circa 120 CE).

The Trirashmi (Pandavleni) Caves, or Nashik Caves, are a group of 24 caves carved between the 1st century BCE and the 2nd century CE, representing the Hinayana Buddhist caves.

=== Dams ===
- Gangapur Dam is on the river Godavari near Gangawadi village and is an earthen dam, Nashik.
- Chankapur dam on the Girna river is one of the dams built by the British in the 19th century. It is 3 km (1.9 mi) from the village Abhona in Kalwan tehsil and 60 km (37 mi) from Nashik.
- Kashypi Dam is on the Kashypi river near Rajapur, Nashik.
- Girna Dam is an earth-fill dam on the Girna river near Nandgaon, Nashik District.
- Darna Dam is a gravity dam on the Darna river near Igatpuri, Nashik district.

=== Kumbh Mela ===
The Kumbh Mela is celebrated every six years at Haridwar and Prayagraj and Maha Kumbh takes place every twelve years at four places: Prayagraj, Haridwar, Ujjain, and Nashik. According to the Puranas, it is believed that Kumbh derives its name from an immortal pot of nectar, which the devatas (Gods) and rakshasas (Demons) fought over. The four places where the nectar fell are at the banks of the river Godavari in Nashik, river Shipra River in Ujjain, river Ganges in Haridwar and at the Triveni Sangam of Ganga, Yamuna and the invisible Saraswati River in Prayagraj.

=== Gardens ===
There are numerous gardens built and maintained by NMC throughout the city. Shivaji Garden on Main Road is one of the oldest. There were rose farms near Mumbai Naka. NMC Pushpotsav (Festival of Flowers) is celebrated every year in main building, Rajiv Gandhi Bhavan.

=== Library ===
Sarvajanik Vachanalaya Nashik is one of the oldest libraries and reading rooms of India, established around 1840 by the British. Spread across several stories and over numerous rooms, the collection of 1,75,000 books includes books in English, Marathi, Hindi and Sanskrit.

=== Theatres ===
Kalidas Kala Mandir and Parshuram Saykhedkar Natyagruha are drama theatres regularly visited by the public.

== Transport ==
=== By Air ===
Nashik airport

Nashik has its airport located at Ozar, and an older airstrip at Gandhinagar. The Gandhinagar Airstrip is now reserved for the military. Nashik Airport is a domestic airport and connects Nashik to Ahmedabad, Delhi, Goa, Hyderabad, Indore, Bangalore, Jaipur(via Indore).

=== By Rail ===
Nasik Road railway station is city railway station along with Deolali which lies within the city boundary. Regular travellers also travel to Kasara or Igatpuri from Mumbai and take a cab or bus to reach Nasik.

=== By Road ===
Nashik is served by National Highway 60. Mumbai-Nashik Expressway connects Nashik to Mumbai. India's first 10-lane expressway will be built between Nashik and Pune. The Surat-Nashik-Chennai expressway goes through Nashik city. The Samruddhi Mahamarg also goes 15 km (9.3 mi) from Nashik city, through Sinnar.

=== Public transport ===
- Nashik Municipal Corporation (NMC) rolled out its city bus service Citilinc on 8 July 2021. The previous state government had given its nod to the NMC to take over the city bus service from the ailing Maharashtra State Road Transport Corporation (MSRTC).
- Metro (Proposed) – Greater Nashik Metro is proposed by Maharashtra Metro Rail Corporation Limited. It was cancelled on opposition since there seemed no severe requirement with availability of wide road connectivity across city.
- Trams (1889–1933) - Nashik was the third city in India after Kolkata and Mumbai to get trams. Trams started operating in 1889. It originated from the Old Municipal Corporation building located on Main Road and terminated at the Nasik Road railway station (8–10 km). It passes through areas of Ganjamal (the now defunct bus stop was earlier a tram stop) and behind the Fame Multiplex. Brady's, a private company funded the project and later introduced India's first petrol-engine-driven tram under the aegis of Nasik Tramway Co. The tramway closed down in around 1933 owing to successive years of famine and plague, owing to which it had run into heavy losses.
- Auto Rickshaws - The city has a number of autorickshaws that work on sharing as well as direct fare basis.
- Rideshare cabs - Rideshare companies such as Ola, Uber, Rapido among others operate bike taxis, taxicabs and auto-rickshaws in nashik.

== Education ==
The city has two state-run universities: the Yashwantrao Chavan Maharashtra Open University and the Maharashtra University of Health Sciences.

== International relations ==
Twin towns and sister cities

- Budapest, Hungary (2018)
- Singkawang, West Kalimantan, Indonesia

Tehsils of Nashik:

- Malegaon
- Dindori
- Nandgaon
- Igatpuri
- Kalwan
- Baglan taluka

== Notable people ==
- Madhav Mantri, cricketer (Note: Madhav Mantri played for team India, Maharashtra cricket team and Mumbai cricket team.)
- Abhishek Raut, cricketer
- Anant Laxman Kanhere, revolutionary, freedom fighter
- Anjana Thamke, athlete
- Dadasaheb Phalke, Film director, and editor regarded as the "father of Indian cinema"
- Pandit Dattatreya Vishnu Paluskar, Hindustani classical vocalist
- Dadasaheb Gaikwad (Bhaurao Krishnaji Gaikwad), politician, social worker
- Vamandada Kardak, Ambedkar movement activist, Marathi poet.
- Baburao Bagul, Marathi author
- Kusumagraj, Marathi poet, playwright and novelist
- Shivaji Tupe, painter
- Krishnaji Gopal Karve, Indian freedom fighter, revolutionary
- Tatya Tope, leader in the Indian Rebellion of 1857
- Dhairya Dand, inventor, artist, designer
- Kavita Raut, long-distance runner
- Sunil Khandbahale, innovator, entrepreneur, language enthusiast
- Dattaraya Ramchandra Kaprekar, recreational mathematician
- Aaryan Nitin Shukla, Human Calculator
- Vinayak Damodar Savarkar developed the Hindu nationalist political ideology of Hindutva.
- Nazima, actress
- Aishwarya Narkar, actress in Marathi films, serials and plays, Hindi serials, commercials
- Anita Date-Kelkar, actress, known for Radhika in Majhya Navryachi Bayko
- Sayali Bhagat, model/actress, Femina Miss India World 2004
- Mahadev Govind Ranade, Indian scholar, social reformer and author
- Ramesh Raskar, computer scientist
- Dattu Baban Bhokanal, rower
- Chinmay Udgirkar, actor
- Vidit Gujrathi, Indian chess grandmaster
- Saiyami Kher, actress
- Anjali Patil, actress
- Shashank Khaitan, film writer, director, actor and producer
- Mrunal Dusanis, actress
- Lalita Pawar, actress
- Chhagan Bhujbal, politician
- Uttamrao Dhikale, politician
- Pradnya Gadre, badminton player
