= Shivaji Tupe =

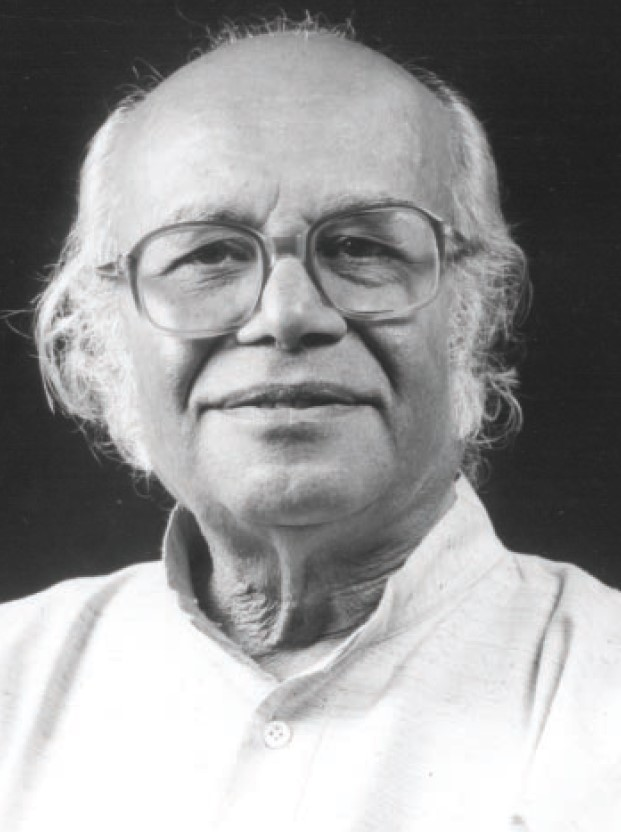
- Born: 1935; Sinnar, Nashik, Maharashtra, India
- Died: 8 August 2013 (aged 77–78); Nashik, Maharashtra, India
- Education: Sir J. J. School of Art
- Known for: Water-colour Painting, Sketching
- Notable work: Paintings of riverbanks of Godavari
- Awards: K. R. Paranjape Gunjan Kala Puraskar

Shivaji Tupe was an Indian artist from Nashik. He was known for his work in watercolor medium and sketches that illustrated the beauty of nature. He was more interested in portraying the scenic beauty of river banks such as Godavari Ghaats in Nashik and Gangaa Ghaats of Banaras, over five decades.

== Early life and education ==
Shivaji Tupe was born in the family with art background. He was born in a small village Sinnar in Nashik district. His interest in art was no surprise for his family. Tupe took the painting as passion, rather than just a profession. He completed his formal education in arts from J.J. School of arts in Mumbai in 1957.

== Work and achievements ==
Shivaji Tupe is well known among the community for putting the aesthetics of Godaghaat on canvas. He fell in love with architecture of ancient temples such as Naroshankar temple, kalaram temple, Sundarnarayan temple etc. His paintings mainly covered the holy culture of temples, Ghaat areas of Godavari and ‘Waada culture’ of Nashik. His work about life in the lanes of town and Waada culture is acclaimed by the art lovers. Tupe roamed all across the country in the search of subjects and Ghaats. The Gangaa Ghaat of Banaras appealed him and he sketched the life of Banaras through his pen-ink medium. He always said that he travelled all across the country but the beauty of Nashik Ghaats captured his mind the most. He was associated with Nashik Kala Niketan. He used to teach art there. Later, he was appointed as the secretary at Nashik Kala Niketan. Solo exhibitions of Tupe's paintings have been organized on many occasions. His art and love towards Godaghaats had earned him fame and a place of respect in art society, also recognition from entities like Lalit Kala Akademi, the Bombay Art Society and Academy of Fine Arts, Kolkata. Among the many awards won by him, the K. R. Paranjape Gunjan Kala Puraskar is an important achievement.
