= Girna River =

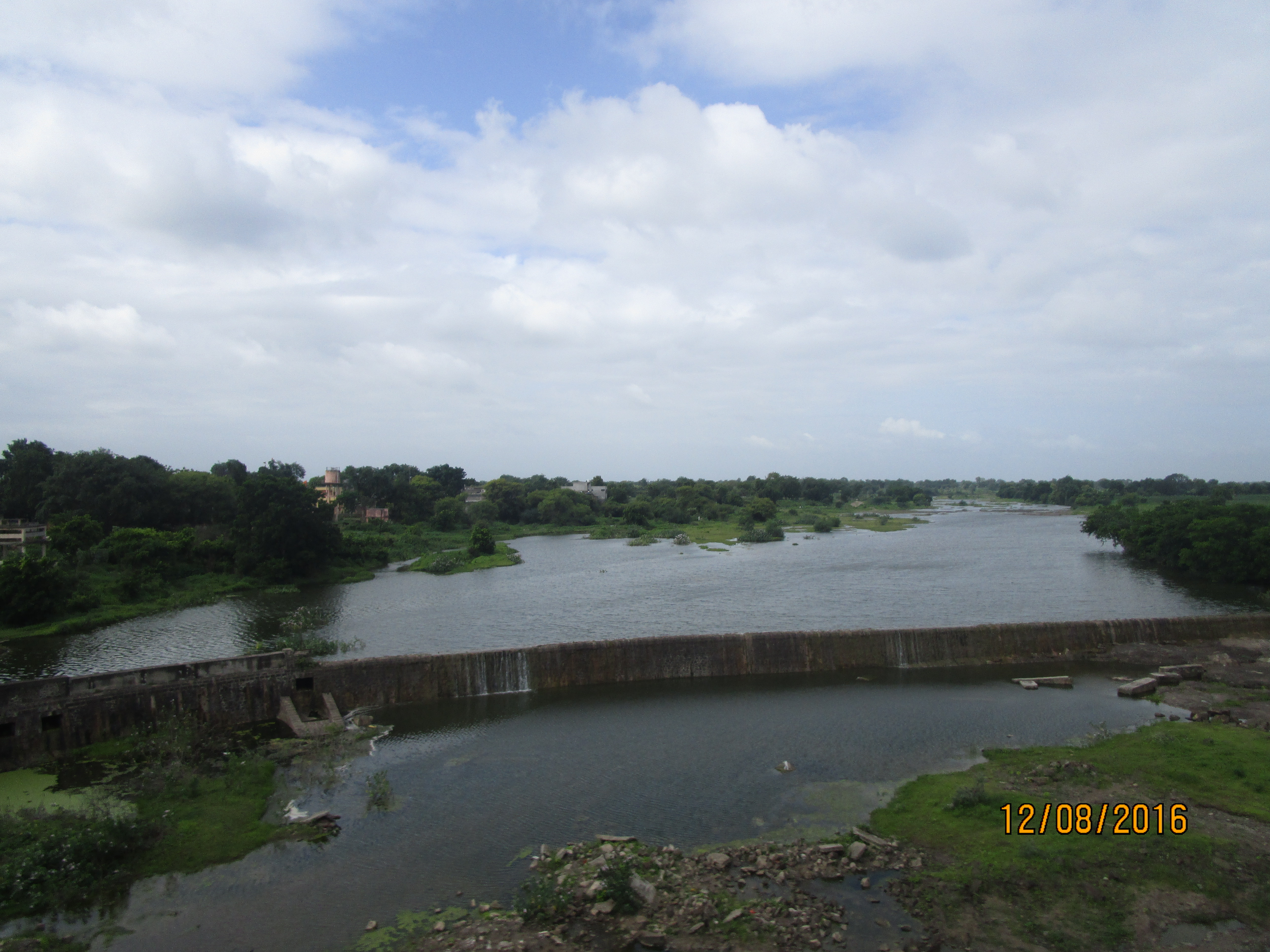

- Location within India Location within Maharashtra

Location
- Country: India
- State: Maharashtra

Physical characteristics
- Source: Saputara
  - location: Western Ghats, Gujarat, India
- Mouth: Tapti River
  - coordinates: 21°08′30″N 75°19′00″E

Basin features
- Tributaries
  - left: Jhiri
  - right: Titoor

The Girna River is a river in the state of Maharashtra in western India. It gets its name from the goddess Giraja, also known as Parvati, and sarp Ganga.

== Course ==
The Girna originates at Kem Peak in the Western Ghats mountain range and flows east across Nashik District—where it is joined by the Mausam River—and into Malegaon. It then swings north to join the Tapti River. The biggest dams on it are Chankapur Dam (built by the British near Abhona in the Kalwan tehsil, where the Sarpganga River joins the Girna) and Girna Dam (built in 1969). The river basin lies on the Deccan Plateau, and its valley has fertile soil that is intensively farmed.

The Gazetteer of the Bombay Presidency described the course of the river as follows:

Rising in the western hills of the Kalvan sub-division of Nasik, and fed by streams from the northern slopes of the Chandor or Saptashring range, after a course of about 150 miles, falls into the Tapti near Palsod(Rameshwar Temple). Its course lies in nearly equal parts in Nasik and Khandesh. Passing through Nasik almost in a straight line eastwards, in Khandesh its course changes to north-east, till, near Jalgaon, it bends north and then north-west flowing for several miles with many windings almost parallel to the Tapti. In Khandesh, except in one or two places where it is hemmed in by rocky hills, the Girna, over a broad sandy bed, flows through a well tilled valley gradually spreading into the great central plain. Its waters, both in Nasik and Khandesh, are much used for irrigation. In Nasik lately repaired dams and channels water many of its upland valleys, and in Khandesh, from Eahal about ten miles north of Chalisgaon, the Jamda canals stretch east for about twenty-seven miles on the left and twelve miles on the right bank.

== See also ==
- List of rivers of India
- Rivers of India
