= Citilinc-Nashik City Bus Service =

Bus service in Maharashtra, India

Nashik Mahanagar Parivahan Mahamandal Limited- Citilinc
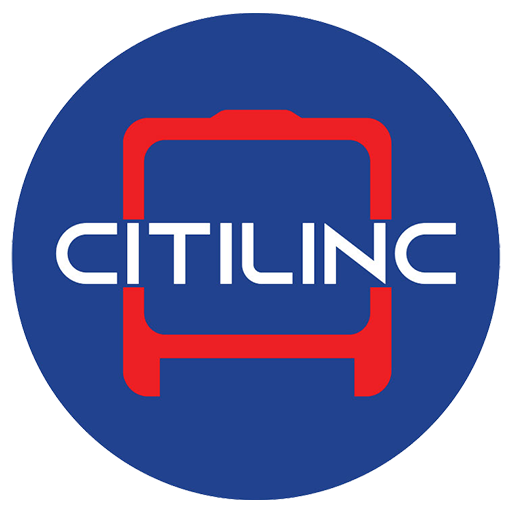

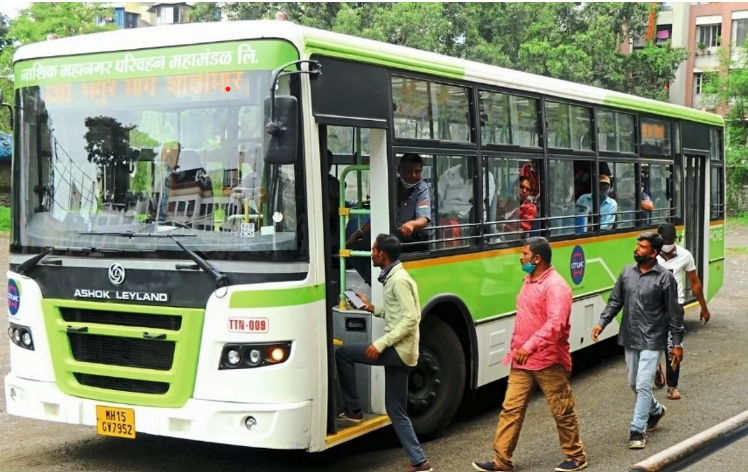
- Citilinc bus at Bhagur Bus Stand
- Parent: Nashik Mahanagar Parivahan Mahamandal Limited (NMPML)
- Founded: 8 July 2021
- Headquarters: NMPML, Nr. Golf Club Ground, Trambakeshwar Road, Opp. Veer Savarkar Taran Talav, Nashik, Maharashtra 422002
- Locale: Nashik Metropolitan Region
- Service area: Nashik
- Service type: Bus
- Routes: 63
- Stops: 1392
- Hubs: Tapovan; Nimani; New CBS; Nashik Road; Adgaon (Only for E-Buses)
- Depots: 4
- Fleet: 300 (50 more AC E-Bus to be inducted by March 2025)
- Daily ridership: 1.15 Lakh daily
- Fuel type: Diesel, CNG, Electric
- Chairman & Managing Director: Dr.Ashok Karanjkar, IAS
- Website: citilinc.nmc.gov.in

Citilinc is the public transport bus service provided by Nashik Mahanagar Parivahan Mahamandal Ltd (SPV of Nashik Municipal Corporation) for the city of Nashik, in Maharashtra. It operates 63 routes around Nashik and its suburban areas with the use of a fleet of nearly 300 buses. Presently, the routes cover a radius of 20km in and around the Nashik area.

== History ==
In 2020, the Nashik Municipal Corporation submitted a feasibility report to the Government of Maharashtra, for the privatisation of bus services in Nashik, as existing services being operated by the state-run Maharashtra State Road Transport Corporation (MSRTC) were found to be loss-making and insufficient for the needs of the city.

== Operations ==
NMPML has a fleet of 250 buses out of which 200 are diesel and 50 are run on CNG which are maintained at 2 bus depots, which ferry around 68000 passengers every day. Distant towns like Sinnar, Dindori, Sukena, Pimpalgaon Baswant, Jategaon, etc. are becoming part of the service. NMPML also plans to acquire 100 electric buses under PM Amrut Scheme in to the existing fleet.
