= Chankapur Dam =

Dam in Maharashtra, India

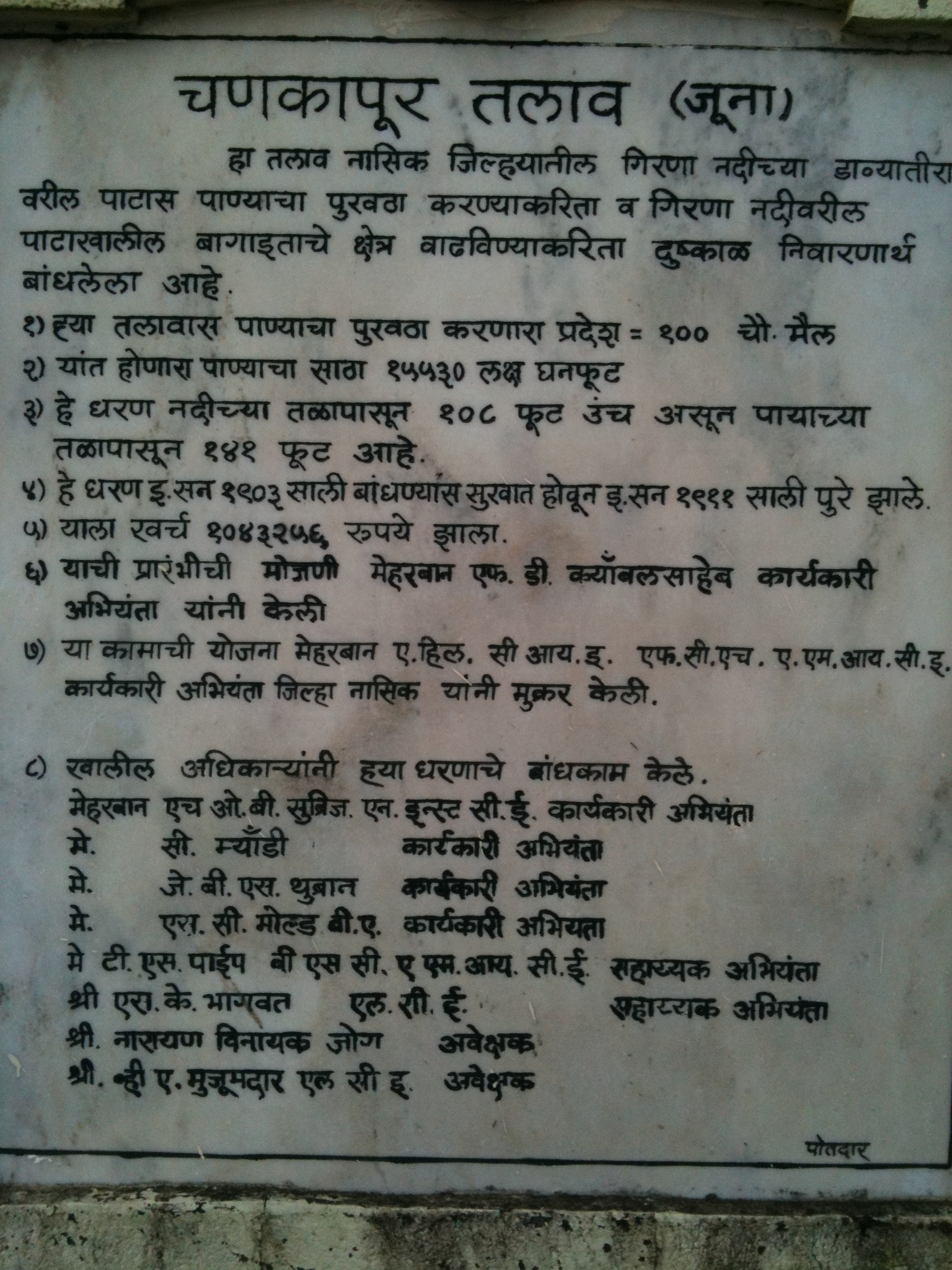
- CHANKAPUR DAM NASIK

- Location within Maharashtra
- Official name: Chankapur Dam D00986
- Location: Kalwan
- Coordinates: 20.4988632°N 73.8834431°E
- Opening date: 1911
- Owners: Government of Maharashtra, India

Dam and spillways
- Type of dam: Earthfill
- Impounds: Girna River
- Height: 41 m (135 ft)
- Length: 3,705 m (12,156 ft)
- Dam volume: 2,123 km^{3} (509 cu mi)

Reservoir
- Total capacity: 76,850 km^{3} (18,440 cu mi)
- Surface area: 10,320 km^{2} (3,980 sq mi)

Chankapur Dam, is an earthfill dam on the Girna River near Abhona in Kalwan tehsil of Nashik district in the state of Maharashtra in India. The dam were built in 19th century by British. Chankapur is one of the biggest dam in Maharashtra.

== Specifications ==
The height of the dam above lowest foundation is 41 m (135 ft) while the length is 3,705 m (12,156 ft). The volume content is 2,123 km^{3} (509 cu mi) and gross storage capacity is 79,690.00 km^{3} (19,118.65 cu mi).

== Purpose ==
- Irrigation

== See also ==
- Dams in Maharashtra
- List of reservoirs and dams in India
