= Charmakar =

Community classified as a Scheduled Caste in India

The Charmkar are a community classified as a Scheduled Caste present all over India. They are mainly engaged as cobblers and agricultural labourers.
