= Kalaram Temple =

Hindu temple in Nashik, Maharashtra

- काळा राम मंदिर
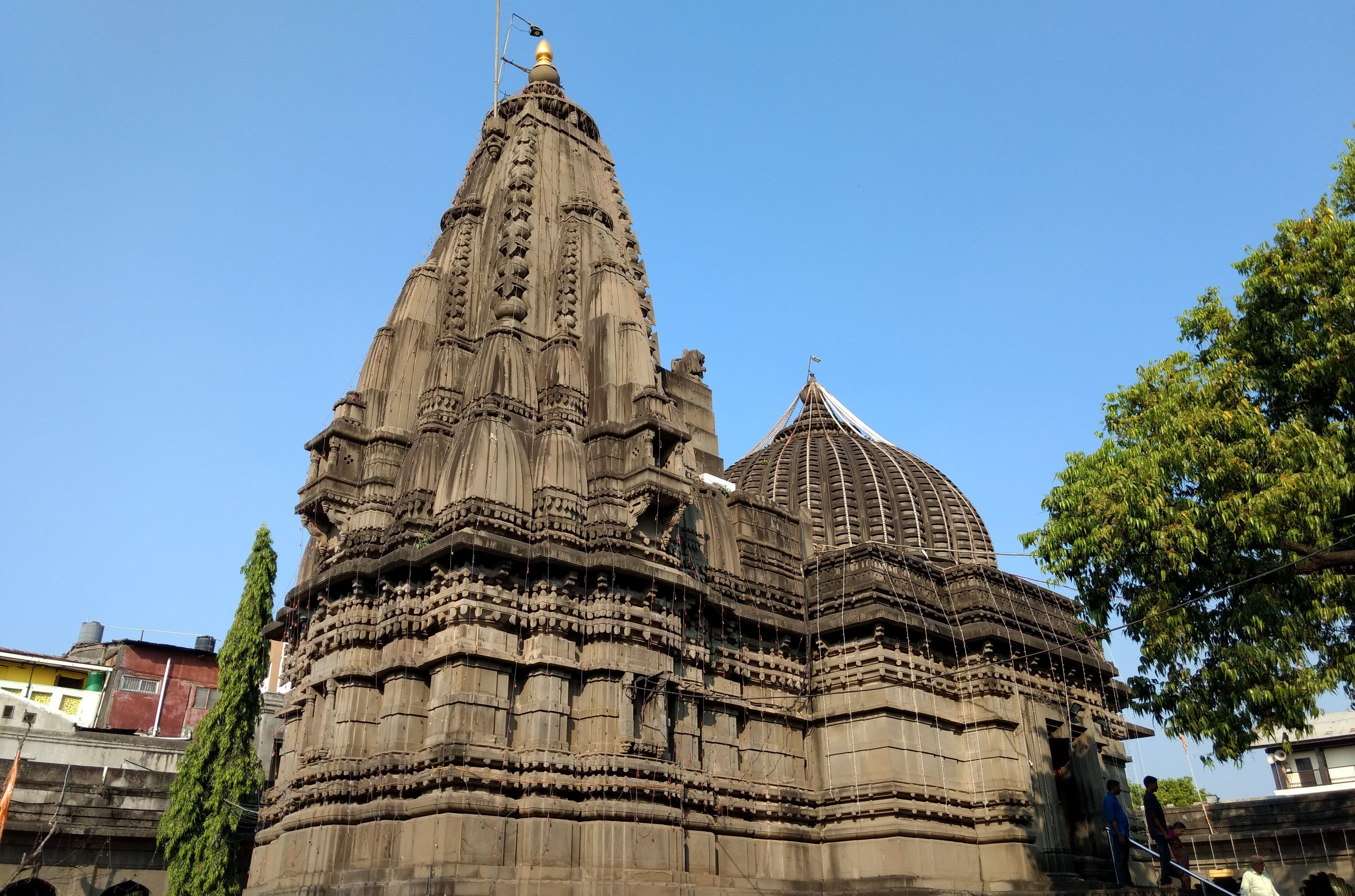
- Kalaram temple's side view

- Kalaram mandir in Nashik

Religion
- Affiliation: Hinduism
- District: Nashik district
- Deity: Rama, Sita, and Lakshmana
- Festival: • Rama Navami • Navaratri • Diwali
- Ecclesiastical or organizational status: Active
- Governing body: Shri Kalaram mandir sansthan, Nashik
- Status: Active

Location
- Location: Panchavati, Nashik
- State: Maharashtra
- Country: India
- Interactive map of Kalaram Temple
- Coordinates: 20°00′25″N 73°47′42″E

Specifications
- Length: 24 m (79 ft)
- Width: 13 m (43 ft)
- Materials: Black stone, chalk
- Elevation: 577 m (1,893 ft)

Website
- https://shrikalaramsansthannasik.org

Kalaram Temple, is a Hindu temple in Nashik of Nashik district in Maharashtra, dedicated to the deity Rama. It is a temple situated in Panchavati area of the Nashik. The temple derives its name from a black statue of Rama. The literal translation of kalaram is "black Rama". The sanctum sanctorum also houses the statues of the goddess Sita and the god Lakshmana. Thousands of devotees visit the temple every day.

== History ==
The original temple dedicated to an unknown deity was very old, estimated to be of the Rashtrakuta Period from the 7th to 11th centuries. However, the claimed antiquity of the Rama idol, which was more than 2000 years old, has not been verified. According to an anecdote, during the early Turkish invasions, the idol of the deity was thrown into the Godavari River by the Temple Brahmins to save it. One Sardar Rangarao Odhekar funded the new temple which was rebuilt around the 1700s. It is claimed that once Odhekar had a dream that the statue of Rama in black color was in the Godavari River. He carried out an expedition to revive the idol and miraculously got it. Odhekar took the statue from the river and requested a saint for the reconsecration of the statue as per the instructions of God in the dream. After that Odhekar built the temple. Odhekar's expedition is an important part of Nashik's history. There is a statue of Sardar Odhekar in the temple.

According to ancient epic of the Ramayana, Rama was sent in exile for fourteen years. After the tenth year of exile, Rama along with Lakshmana and Sita, lived for two and half years on the northern bank of the Godavari near Nasik. This place is known as Panchavati.

=== B.R. Ambedkar's Kalaram Mandir Satyagrah ===
The temple came middle of the conflict caused by Satyagraha organised and led by B.R. Ambedkar. Now it is known as Kalaram mandir satyagraha. Ambedkar organised a large protest outside this temple on 2 March 1930, in order to enter into the temple. Many Dalit protesters arrived to the town by trucks, they surrounded the temple and sat around it. They sang songs, often raised war cries, demanded to enter in the temple. The people of Nashik boycotted the protesters. On the day of Rama Navami 9 April 1930, the Dalit protesters tried to stop the temple ratha yatra; fights and stone pelting began between the higher caste Hindus and the Dalit protesters, later Ambedkar reached at the riot spot, he and other all the protesters suffered minor injuries. Somehow a protester named Bhaskar Kendre broke the police cordon who were protecting the temple and enter in it and fell on the floor. This satyagraha ran till 1935.

== Temple complex ==
The main entrance has a black idol of Hanuman.There is also a very old tree that has Dattatreya's footprint impressions marked on a stone. Pilgrims visit the Kapaleshwar Mahadev temple near the Kalaram Temple.

Hanuman's temple is designed in such a way that, Rama's idol can be visible from Hanuman's idol.Main temple of Rama has 14 steps, which represents 14 years of Rama's exile. Also, the temple has 84 pillars.
