= Girna Dam =

- Official name: Girna Dam D01026
- Location: Malegaon, Nashik
- Opening date: 1969
- Owners: Government of Maharashtra, India

Dam and spillways
- Type of dam: Earthfill
- Impounds: Girna river
- Height: 54.56 m (179.0 ft)
- Length: 963.17 m (3,160.0 ft)
- Dam volume: 2,042 km^{3} (490 cu mi)

Reservoir
- Total capacity: 525,920 km^{3} (126,170 cu mi)
- Surface area: 60,040 km^{2} (23,180 sq mi)

In 1969, Girna Dam was constructed on the Girna River near Nandgaon in the Nasik District of Maharashtra state in India.

== Specifications ==
The height of the dam above lowest foundation is 54.56 m (179.0 ft) while the length is 963.17 m (3,160.0 ft). The volume content is 2,042 km^{3} (490 cu mi) and gross storage capacity is 608,980.00 km^{3} (146,102.07 cu mi).

== See also ==
- Dams in Maharashtra
- List of reservoirs and dams in India
