= Abhona =

Village in Maharashtra

- Town
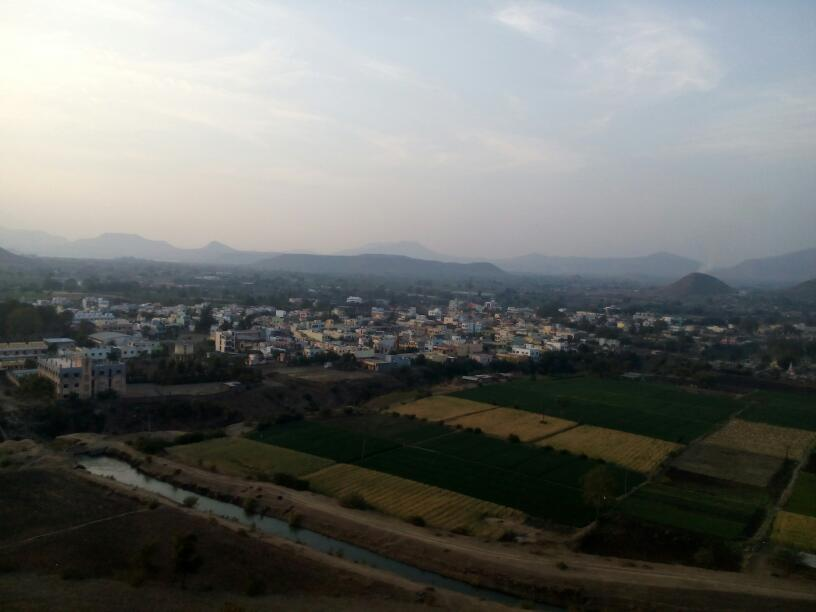
- Abhona view form southeast (Malhari Temple)

- Location within Maharashtra
- Coordinates: 20°28′40″N 73°55′30″E
- Country: India
- State: Maharashtra
- District: Nashik

Area
  - Total: 4 km^{2} (1.5 sq mi)
- Elevation: 760 m (2,490 ft)

Population (2021)
  - Total: 15,000+

Languages
  - Official: Marathi
- Time zone: UTC+5:30 (IST)
- PIN: 423502
- Telephone code: +02592
- Vehicle registration: MH 41

Abhona is a village in Kalwan tehsil of Nashik district in the Indian state of Maharashtra. It belongs to the North Maharashtra region. Situated on the banks of the Girna River, it is historically significant as the native village and birth place of India's first female commander in Maratha Empire Umabai Dabhade.

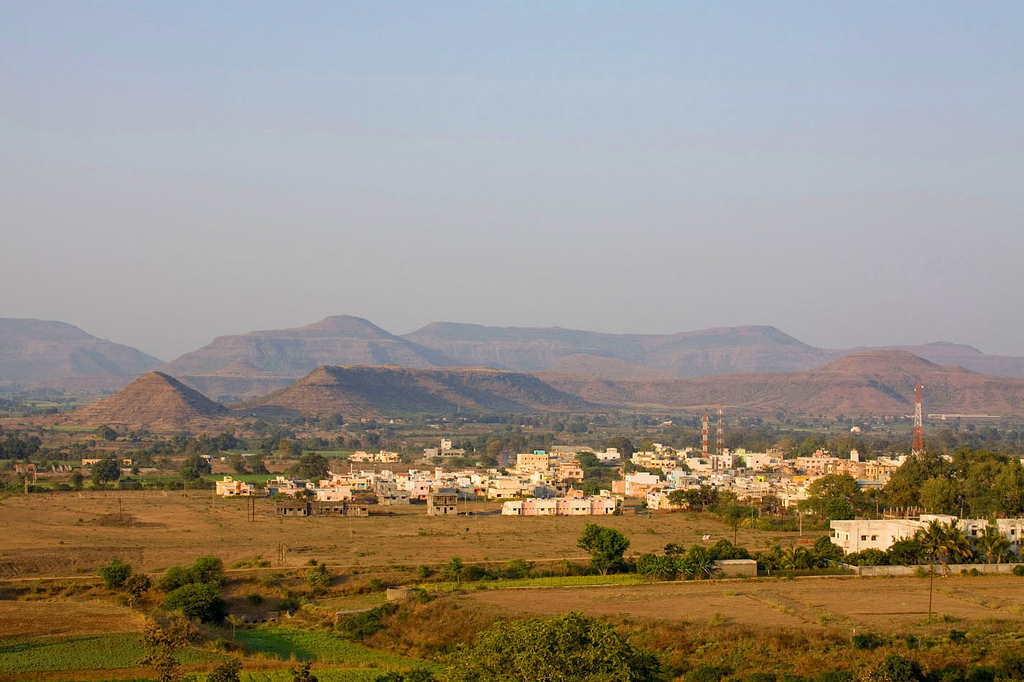
Abhona view from south.

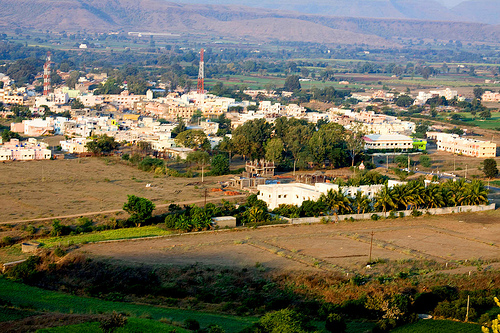
Abhona from Southwest.

== Location ==
Abhona is located 60 km towards north from district headquarters Nashik, 12 km from Kalwan and 240 km from state capital Mumbai. Abhona is situated 760 meters above sea level.

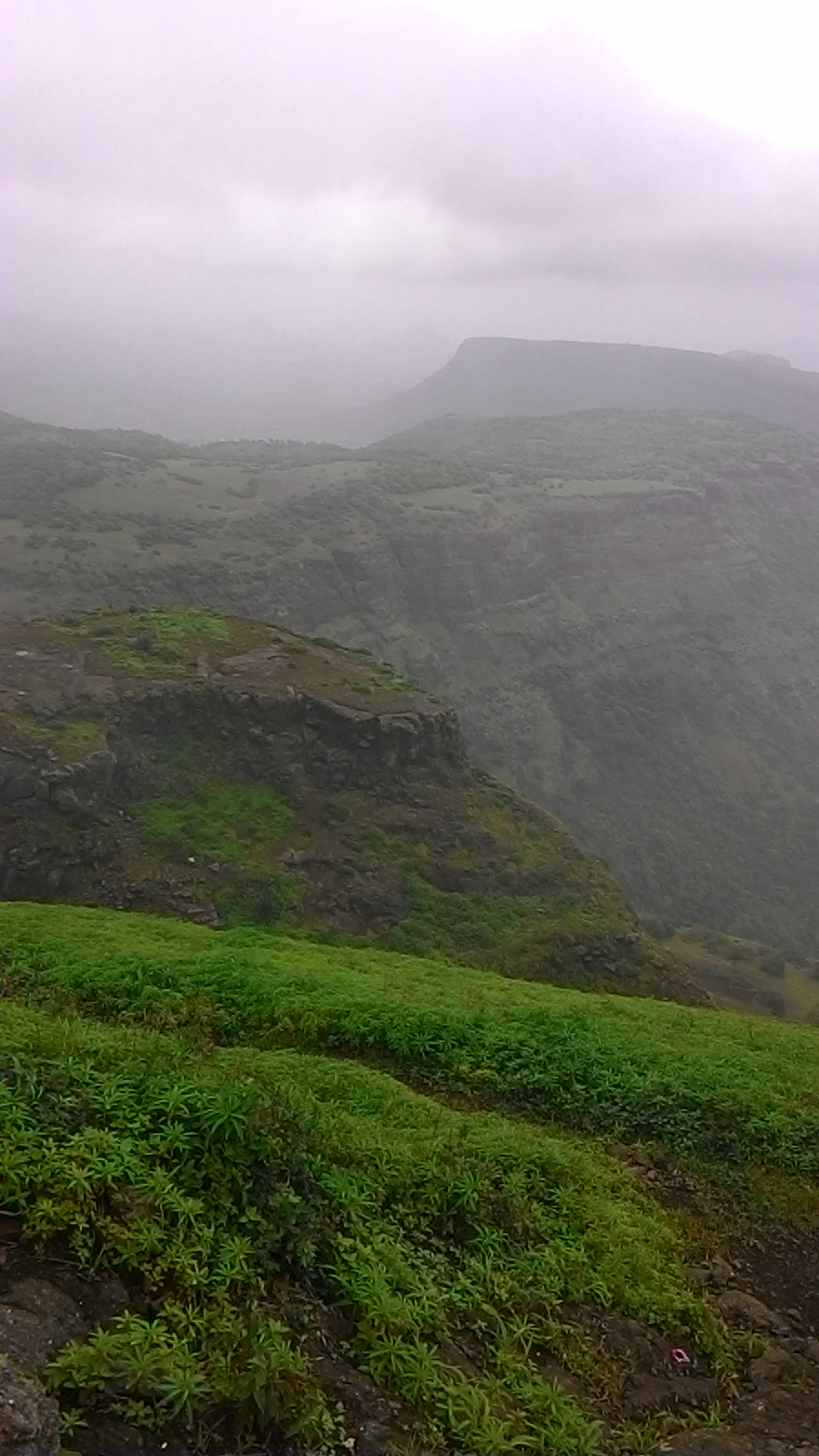
Hills around Abhona.
