= Wan Dam =

Wan dam may refer to:

- Wan Dam, Akola - a dam near Akola on Wan river
- Wan Dam, Ambejogai - a dam near Ambejogai on Wan river
