= Wan Hydroelectric Project =

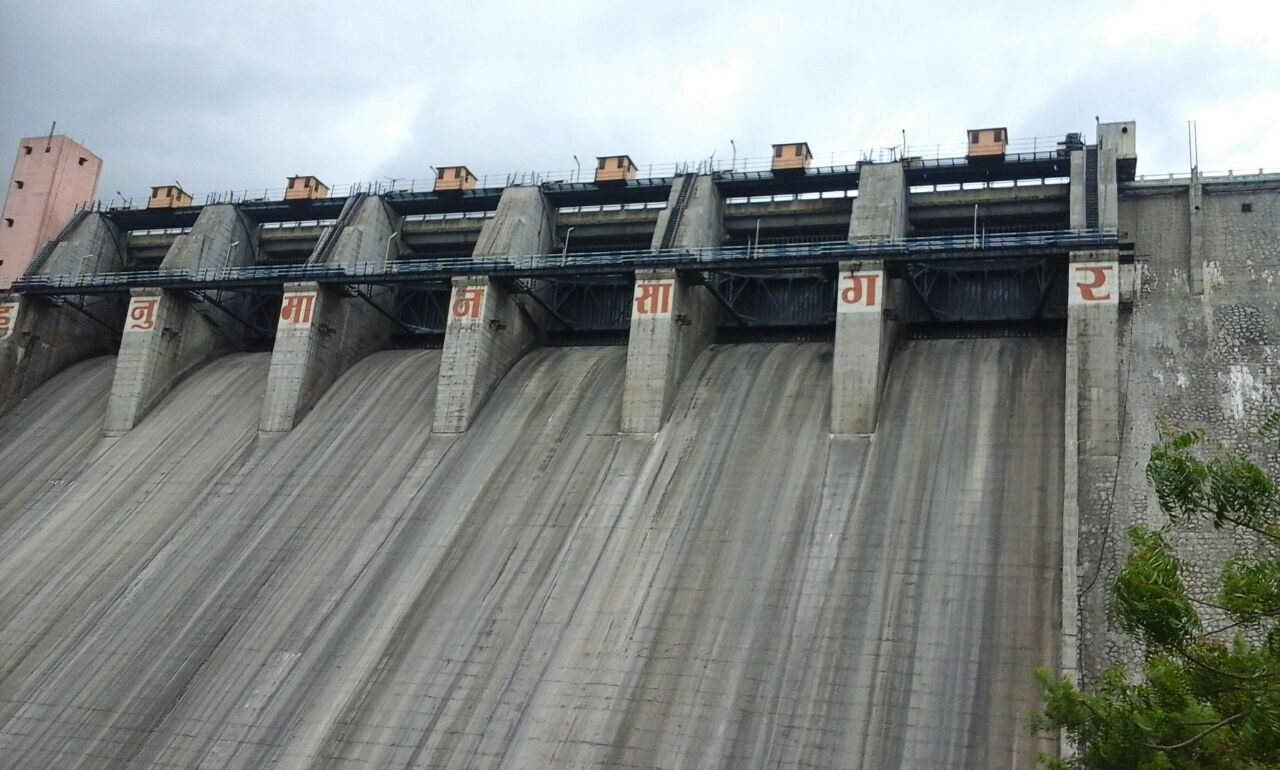

- Location within Maharashtra
- Location: Akola
- Coordinates: 21.183611°N 76.804047°E
- Opening date: 2000
- Owners: Government of Maharashtra, India

Dam and spillways
- Type of dam: Earthfill; Gravity
- Impounds: Wan river
- Height: 67.65 m (221.9 ft)
- Length: 500 m (1,600 ft)
- Dam volume: 599 km^{3} (144 cu mi)

Reservoir
- Creates: Hanuman Sagar
- Total capacity: 81,955 km^{3} (19,662 cu mi)
- Surface area: 4,391 km^{2} (1,695 sq mi)

Power Station
- Operators: Chief Engineer (Electrical), Hydro Projects, WRD, GOM
- Commission date: March 01, 2008
- Turbines: Horizontal shaft Francis
- Installed capacity: 1.5 MW
- Annual generation: 4.174 Mus
- Website wrd.maharashtra.gov.in

Wan Hydroelectric Project is situated near the village of Wari in the Telhara Tehsil in the Akola district. This project envisages power generation utilizing irrigation releases for approximately 333 days of the year.

The powerhouse, with an installed capacity of one unit of 1.5 MW (1×1.5 MW), is installed as a surface powerhouse at the foot of the Wan Dam. The annual generation is 4.174 MU.

This project was administratively approved by the Government of Maharashtra vide Irrigation Department Resolution No. HBP 1094/(202/94) H.P., Mantralaya, Mumbai, dated 24 January 2000, for ₹712.421 lakh.

== Technical Information ==
The main equipments are Turbine, Hydro Generator, Power and Control Cables, Power Transformer, Auxiliary Transformer, 110 V DC Equipments.

=== Turbine ===
Horizontal shaft Francis, type hydraulic turbine of rated output not less than 1650 kW at rated head of 33 m. and rated discharge of 7.33 cumecs with Governor and related auxiliary equipment such as oil pressure unit drainage and dewatering system, air compressor system, Nitrogen gas system, cooling water system.

=== Hydro Generator ===
Horizontal shaft synchronous generator of rating 2000 kVA, 3.3 kV, 3 phase, 50 Hz, 0.866 (lag) with exciter, AVR panel suitable to couple the turbine with other related auxiliary equipment comprising fire extinguishing, neutral end cubicles, brake system etc.

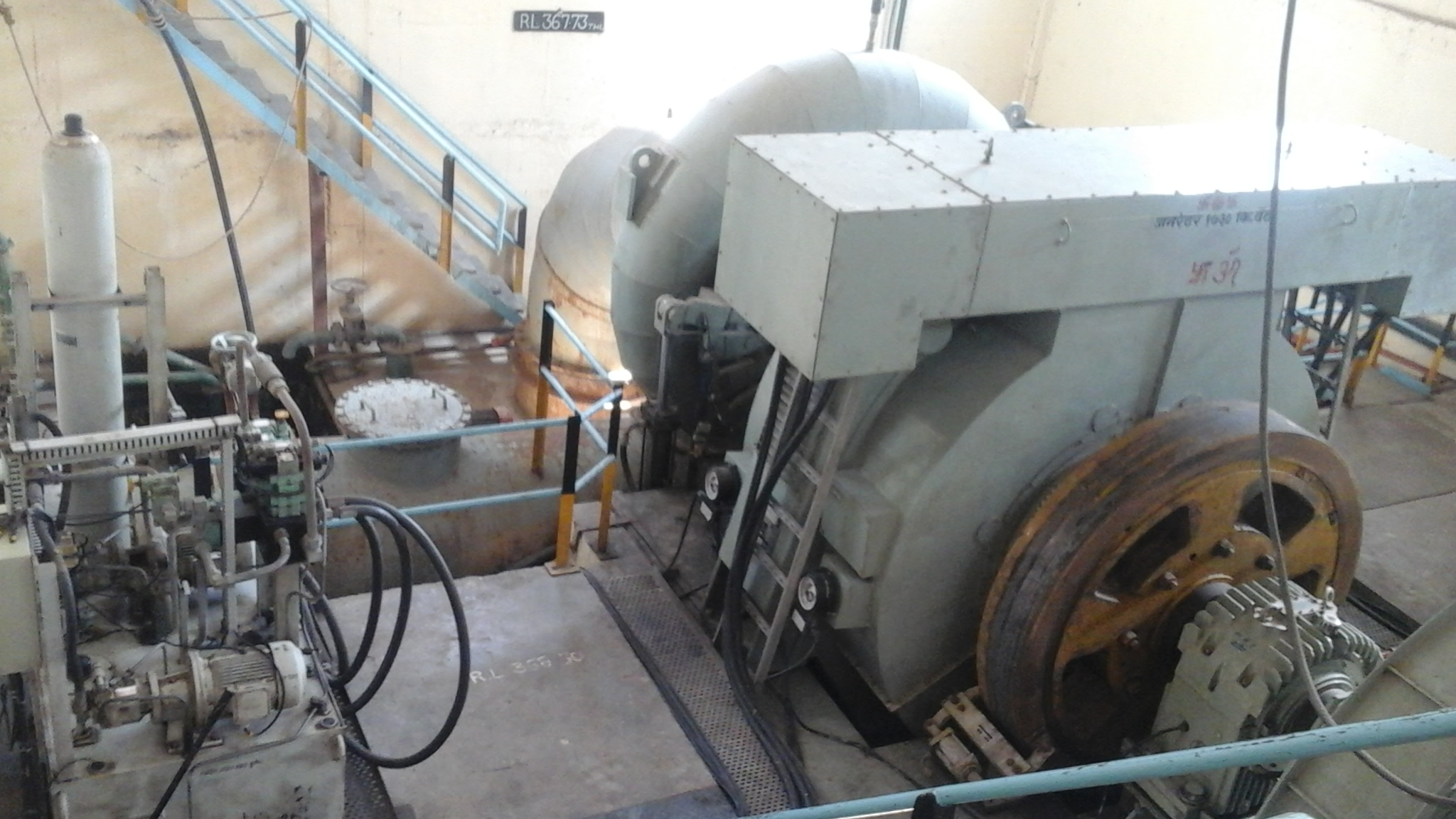
Alternator

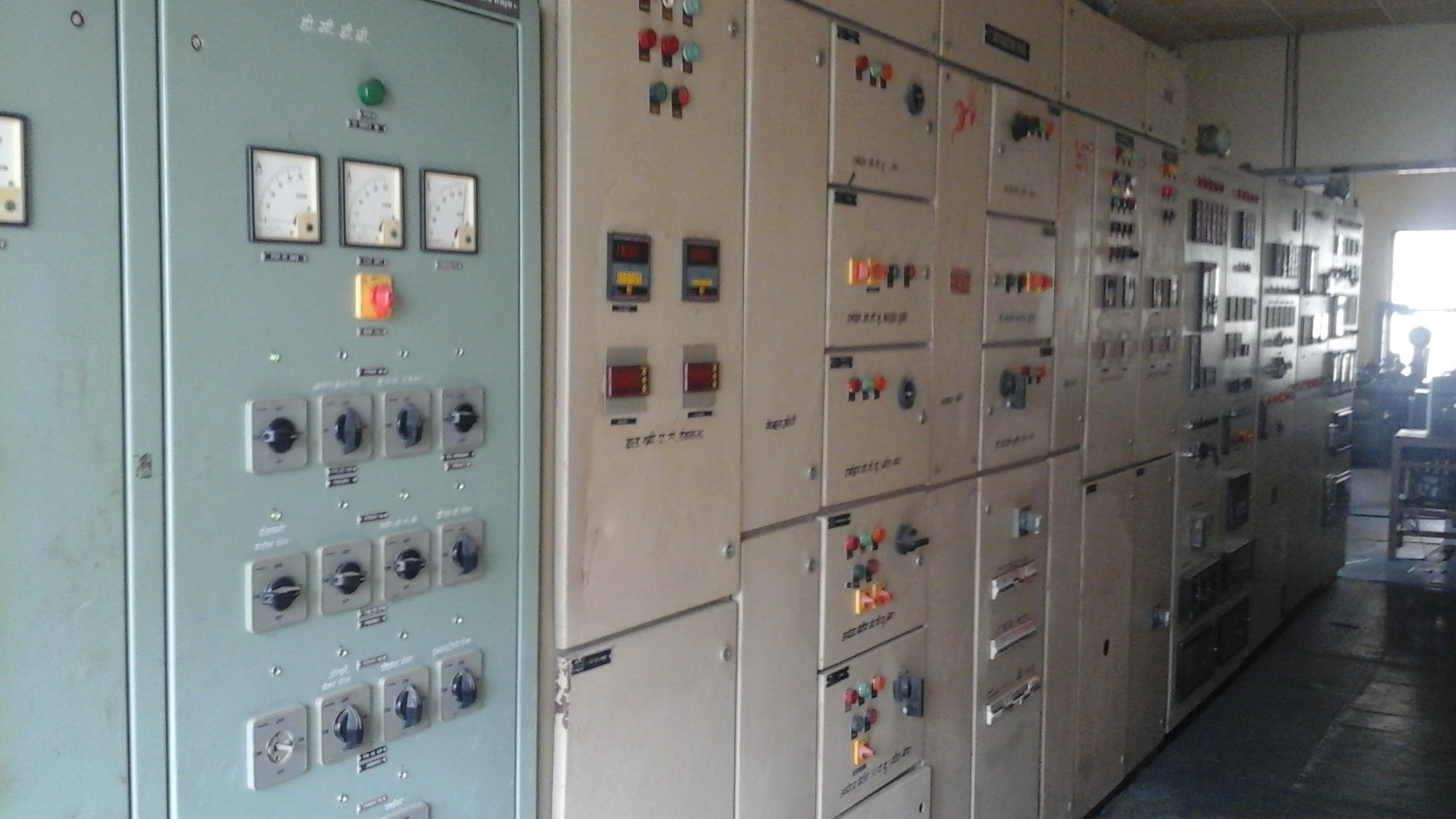
Control Room

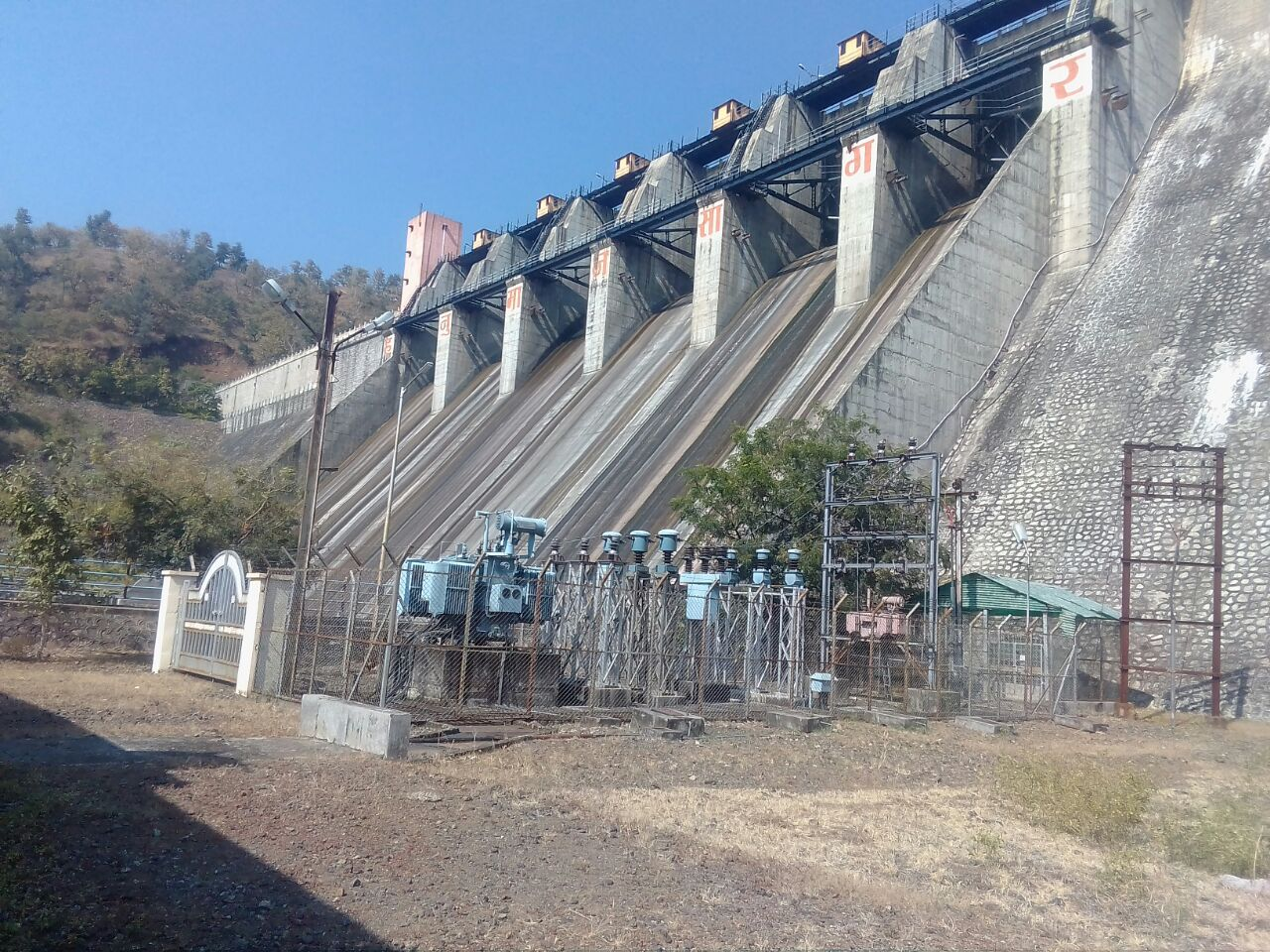
3.3 kV / 11 kV Switchyard

=== Power and Control Cables ===
3.3 kV, XLPE Power cable and 1.1 kV power and control cables of suitable sixes required for interconnecting all equipments and preparing cable schedule, supply and laying of cable racks/trays, supports, clamping etc. complete.

=== Power transformer ===
Power Transformer of rating 2000 kVA, 3-phase, 3.3 kV/11 kV, 50 Hz, ONAN outdoor type of 'OFF' load tap changer, terminal box suitable of power cable connections on L.T. side with first filling of oil and accessories etc. as per specification.

=== Auxiliary transformer ===
Auxiliary Transformer of 100 kVA, 3.3 kV/415 V. 3-phase, 50 Hz., indoor type Dyn-II with first filling of oil with auxiliaries

=== 110 V DC equipments ===
Lead acid batteries 110 V, of suitable capacity with required accessories. Battery charger suitable for 110 V, batteries with float and float cum boost charger with accessories.
