= Wan Dam, Ambejogai =

Wan Dam
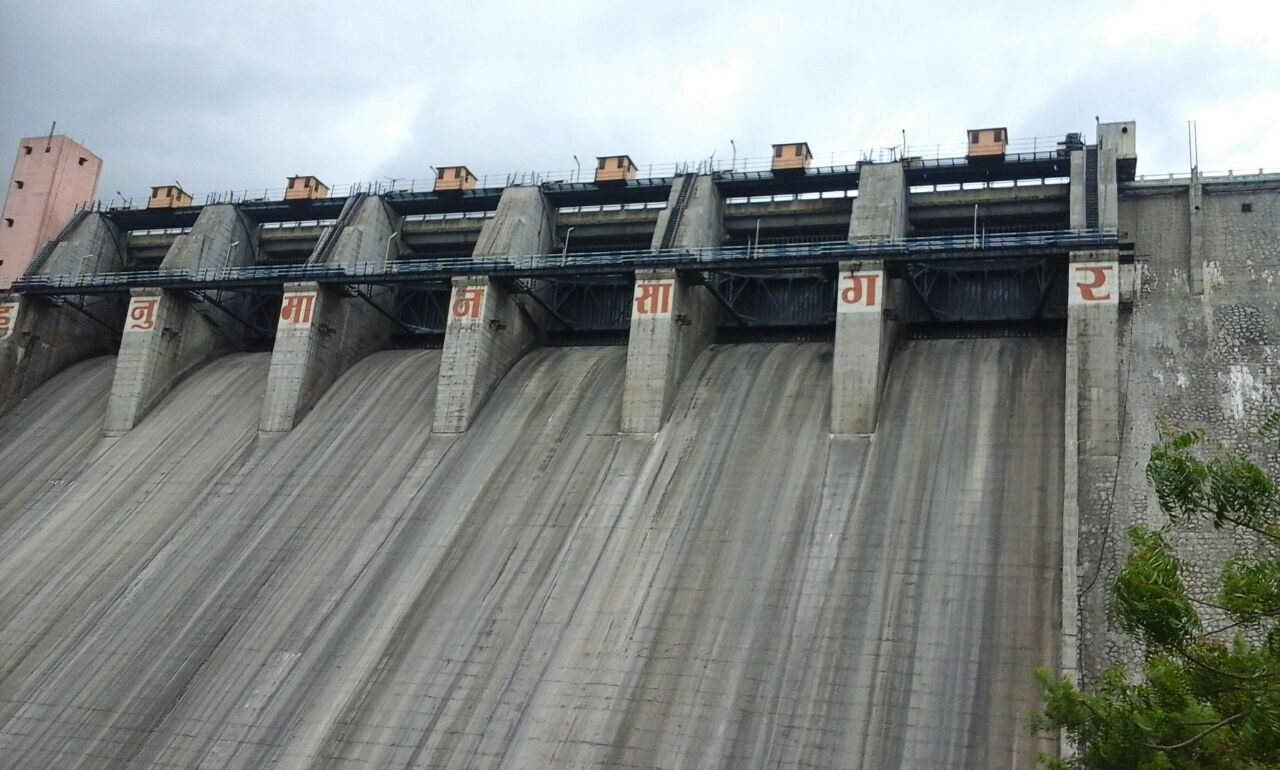

- Location within Maharashtra
- Official name: Wan dam D01222
- Location: Ambejogai
- Coordinates: 18.875590°N 76.454201°E
- Opening date: 1966
- Owners: Government of Maharashtra, India

Dam and spillways
- Type of dam: Earthfill
- Impounds: Wan river
- Height: 19 m (62 ft)
- Length: 2,798 m (9,180 ft)
- Dam volume: 1,358 km^{3} (326 cu mi)

Reservoir
- Total capacity: 2,190 km^{3} (530 cu mi)
- Surface area: 0 km^{2} (0 sq mi)

Wan Dam, also known as Daunapur Dam, is an earthfill dam on Wan river near Ambejogai, Beed district in the state of Maharashtra in India.

== Specifications ==
The height of the dam above its lowest foundation is 19 m (62 ft) while the length is 2,798 m (9,180 ft). The volume content is 1,358 km^{3} (326 cu mi) and gross storage capacity is 25,180.00 km^{3} (6,041.00 cu mi).

== See also ==
- Dams in Maharashtra
- List of reservoirs and dams in India

Wan Hydroelectric Project
