= Wan Dam, Akola =

Wan dam
- Location within Maharashtra
- Official name: Wan dam D03007
- Location: Telhara
- Coordinates: 21.183611°N 76.804047°E
- Opening date: 2000
- Owners: Government of Maharashtra, India

Dam and spillways
- Type of dam: Earthfill; Gravity
- Impounds: Wan river
- Height: 67.65 m (221.9 ft)
- Length: 500 m (1,600 ft)
- Dam volume: 599 km^{3} (144 cu mi)

Reservoir
- Creates: Hanuman Sagar
- Total capacity: .081 km^{3} (0.019 cu mi)
- Surface area: 4,391 km^{2} (1,695 sq mi)

Power Station
- Installed capacity: 1.5 MW

Wan dam is located on wan river at the site of Wari village in Telhara Taluka of Akola District in Maharashtra, India. This is one of the largest irrigation projects in the Indian state of Maharashtra. The water is mainly used to irrigate agricultural land in the western vidarbha. It also provides water for drinking to near by towns, villages and Cities like Akola, Telhara Shegaon.The surrounding area of the dam has a garden old Hanumana temple.

Wan Dam

== Specifications ==
The height of the dam above its lowest foundation is 67.65 m (221.9 ft) while the length is 500 m (1,600 ft). The volume content is 599 km^{3} (144 cu mi) and gross storage capacity is 0.081 km^{3} (0.019 cu mi).

== Purpose ==
- Irrigation
- Hydroelectricity
- Water supply

== See also ==
- Dams in Maharashtra
- List of reservoirs and dams in India
- Wan Hydroelectric Project
