= Modgaon =

Village in Maharashtra

- village
- Location in Maharashtra, India Modgaon (India)
- Coordinates: 20.054588°N 72.9637728°E
- Country: India
- State: Maharashtra
- District: Palghar
- Taluka: Dahanu
- Elevation: 95 m (312 ft)

Population (2011)
  - Total: 5,360
- Time zone: UTC+5:30 (IST)
- 2011 census code: 551638

Modgaon is a village in the Palghar district of Maharashtra, India. It is located in the Dahanu taluka. It is located beside the Kurje Dam reservoir.

== Demographics ==
According to the 2011 census of India, Modgaon has 1057 households. The effective literacy rate (i.e. the literacy rate of population excluding children aged 6 and below) is 42.5%.

Demographics (2011 Census)
	Total	Male	Female
Population	5360	2576	2784
Children aged below 6 years	1108	546	562
Scheduled caste	0	0	0
Scheduled tribe	5341	2564	2777
Literates	1807	1142	665
Workers (all)	2686	1308	1378
Main workers (total)	2098	1066	1032
Main workers: Cultivators	873	430	443
Main workers: Agricultural labourers	928	463	465
Main workers: Household industry workers	92	36	56
Main workers: Other	205	137	68
Marginal workers (total)	588	242	346
Marginal workers: Cultivators	178	76	102
Marginal workers: Agricultural labourers	391	158	233
Marginal workers: Household industry workers	2	0	2
Marginal workers: Others	17	8	9
Non-workers	2674	1268	1406
