= Shirpur (disambiguation) =

Shirpur may refer to:

- Shirpur, Afghanistan, a village in Afghanistan
- Shirpur, a city in India
- Shirpur Taluka, a tehsil in Dhule District, Marharastra, India
- Shirpur Assembly Constituency, in Maharashtra, India
- Shirpur-Warwade, a city in Maharashtra, India
- Shirpur Gold Refinery, a gold refinery in India
