= Gotane =

Village in Maharashtra

- village
- Location in Maharashtra, India Gotane (India)
- Coordinates: 20.88°N 74.60°E
- Country: India
- State: Maharashtra
- District: Dhule
- Talukas: Dhule

Population (2001)
  - Total: 2,879

Languages
  - Official: Marathi
- Time zone: UTC+5:30 (IST)
- Nearest city: Dhule
- Distance from Udane: 4 kilometres (2.5 mi) West (ODR 98)

Gotane is a small village in the state of Maharashtra, India. It is located in the Dhule taluka of Dhule District in Maharashtra.

== Location ==
Gotane is located on the Maharashtra Other District Road 98 (ODR98).

== Demographics ==
As of 2001 census, Gotane had a population of 2,879 with 1,570 males and 1,309 females. Males constitute 54% of the population and females 46%. In Gotane, 1% of the population is under 6 years of age.

There are total of 495 households in the village and the village border area is spread in the area of 956 hectares.

== Economy ==
Gotane farming economy is included in the states income & expenditure accounts. As for budget year 2007-2008 Gotane village had accounted for an income of Rs. 230,000.00 whereas the total expenditure was Rs. 230,000.00.

== Administration ==
Gotane has as Village Gram Panchayat for day-to-day administration. The District Zilla Panchayat headquarters is at Dhule and the Block Panchayat is also at Dhule.

Gotane has no commercial banks, co-operative banks, agricultural credit societies, non-agricultural credit societies or other credit societies present within the village.

== Drinking water facilities ==
Gotane has numerous drinking water facilities which are mainly available through a common tap or a common well. There are two wells and two hand pumps available within the village as drinking water sources.

== Education Facilities ==
Gotane has one primary and one secondary school (R.G.V.Goatne). For all higher education, village students have to go to the bigger cities close by. There is also 1 government funded childcare and mother-care center (Anganwadi) within the village as part of the Integrated Child Development Services program started by the Indian government to combat child hunger and malnutrition in 1975.

== Medical Facilities ==
Gotane has no medical facilities present within the village.

== Communication Facilities ==
Gotane has no postal, telegraph or telephone facilities within the village. The closest post office is at Chaugaon which is 3.2 km from the village.

== Recreation & Cultural Facilities ==
Gotane has no recreational facilities, such as cinemas or video halls present within the village.

Gotane has no cultural facilities like sports-clubs, stadium or auditorium present within the village.

== Transport ==
=== Rail ===
Gotane has no railway station of its own, the closest railway station is Dhule which is 12 km from the village.

=== Road ===
Gotane has bus station and direct state transport (ST) connectivity. Villagers have to rely on the local vehicles for transport to nearby towns.

=== Air ===
Gotane has no airport of its own, the closest airport is at Dhule.

== See also ==
- Chaugaon
- Udane
- Dhule City
- Dhule District
- List of villages in Dhule District
- List of districts of Maharashtra
- Maharashtra
