= Sulwade Barrage Dam =

Sulwade Barrage
- Location within Maharashtra
- Location: Sindkheda
- Coordinates: 21.3020295°N 74.8005867°E
- Opening date: 1999
- Demolition date: N/A
- Owners: Government of Maharashtra, India

Dam and spillways
- Type of dam: Earthfill
- Impounds: Tapi River
- Height: 13 m (43 ft)
- Length: 503 m (1,650 ft)
- Dam volume: 226 km^{3} (54 cu mi)

Reservoir
- Total capacity: 62,110 km^{3} (14,900 cu mi)
- Surface area: 11,870 km^{2} (4,580 sq mi)

Sulwade Barrage Dam is an earthfill dam on the Tapi River near Shirpur, Dhule district in the state of Maharashtra, India.

== Specifications ==
The height of the dam above lowest foundation is 27.73 m (91.0 ft) while the length is 688 m (2,257 ft). The volume content is 226 km^{3} (54 cu mi) and gross storage capacity is 63,640.00 km^{3} (15,268.05 cu mi).

== Purpose ==
- Irrigation

== See also ==
- Dams in Maharashtra
- List of reservoirs and dams in India
