= Padhawad =

Village in Maharashtra, India

- Village
- Location in Maharashtra, India Padhawad (India)
- Country: India
- State: Maharashtra
- District: Dhule
- Taluka: Sindkheda

Area
  - Total: 2 km^{2} (0.77 sq mi)

Population
  - Total: 2,200
  - Density: 617/km^{2} (1,600/sq mi)

Languages
  - Official: Marathi
- Time zone: UTC+5:30 (IST)
- PIN: 425403
- Vehicle registration: MH18

Padhawad is a village situated near Betawad in Sindkheda taluka of Dhule district in the state of Maharashtra, India.

== Location ==
Padhawad is located near the banks of the Panzara River, in northern Maharashtra. The village is approximately 28 km from Sindkheda and 43 km from Dhule.

== Demographics ==
As per the Census of India 2011, the village has a population of 2200 people. The primary occupation is agriculture, and the local language spoken is Marathi.

== Education ==
The village has multiple educational institutions providing to primary and secondary education. Some students also pursue higher education in nearby towns like Shirpur, Amalner, and Dhule. The village has 3 schools:

- Vivekanand High School
- Zilla Parishad School
- Anganwadi

== Economy ==
Agriculture is the main source of income. Major crops include cotton, Corn, bajra, and soybeans. Some villagers are also involved in dairy and small-scale trading.

== Transport ==
The village is connected by road to Betawad and nearby towns. The nearest railway station is in Betawad, and the closest airport is in Jalgaon.

== Culture and Religion ==
Padhawad has several temples where festivals like Diwali, Ganesh Chaturthi, and Holi are celebrated with enthusiasm.

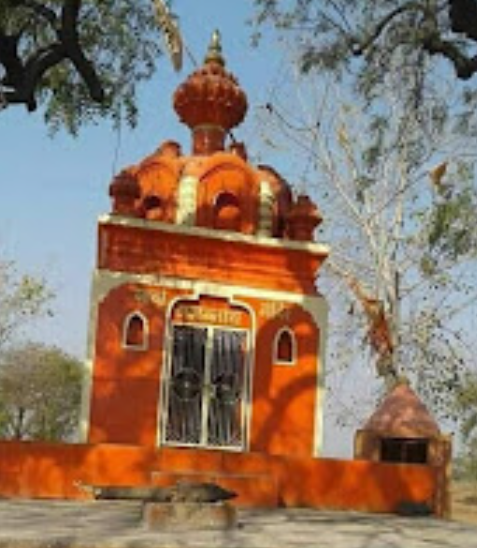
Jagannath Maharaj Mandir

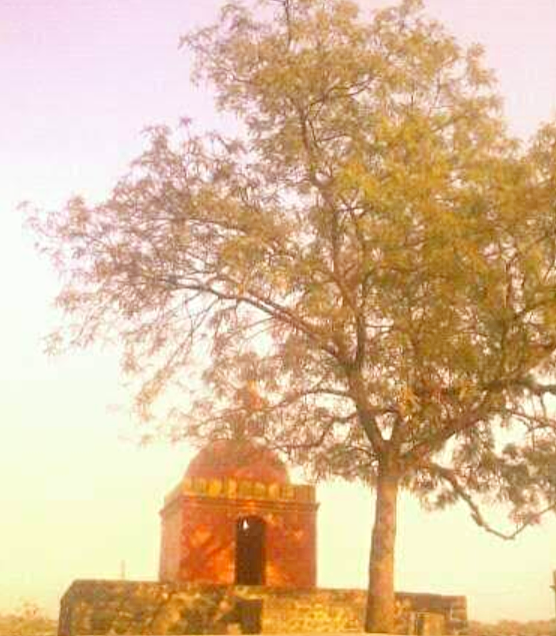
Mahadev Maroti Mandir Parisar Padhawad

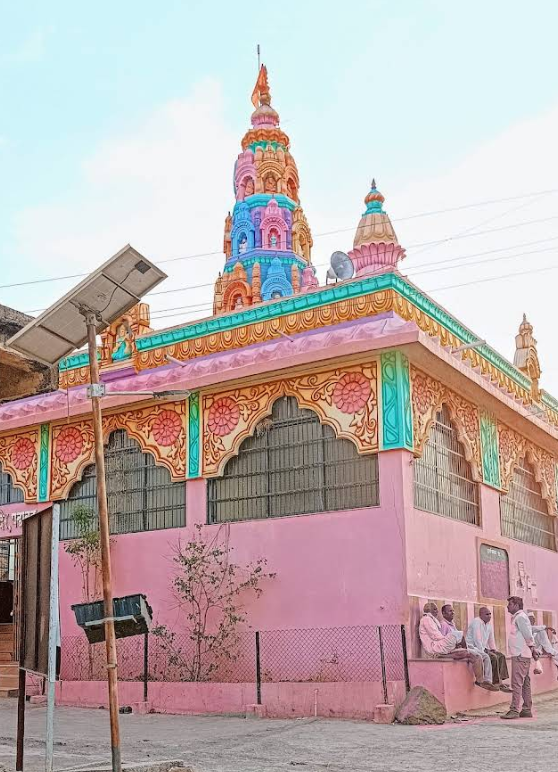
Vitthal Mandir

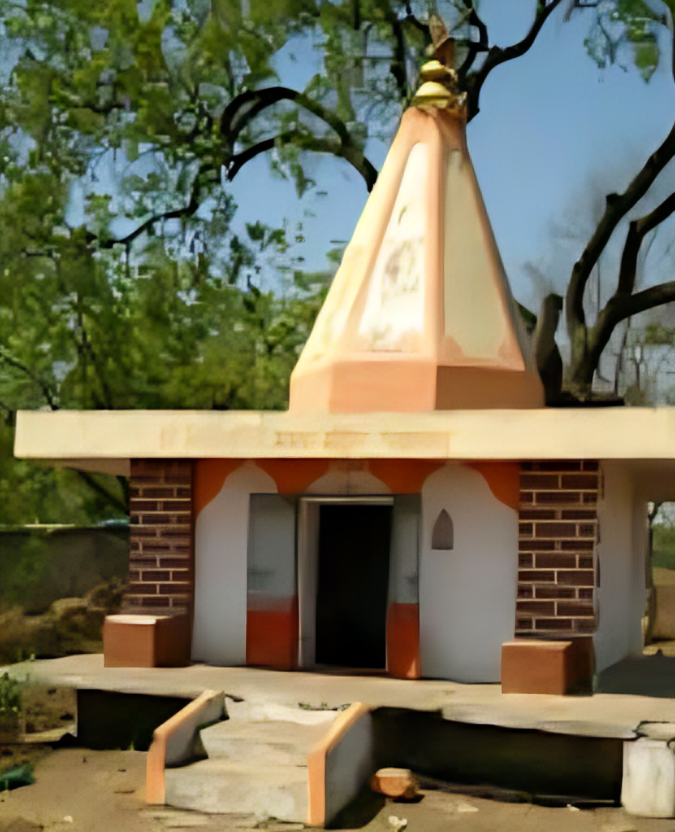
Shree Indasini Mata Mandir

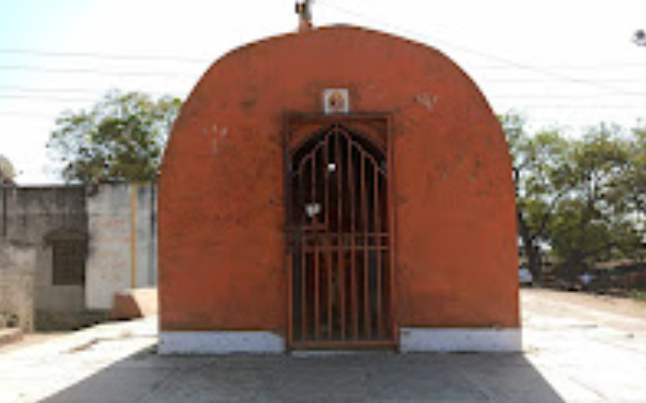
Hanuman Mandir

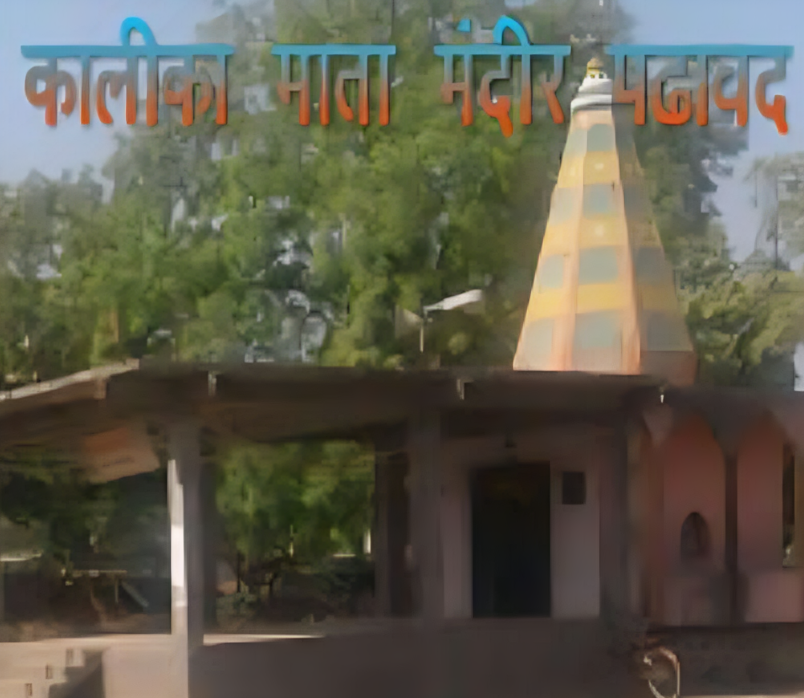
Kalika Mata Temple

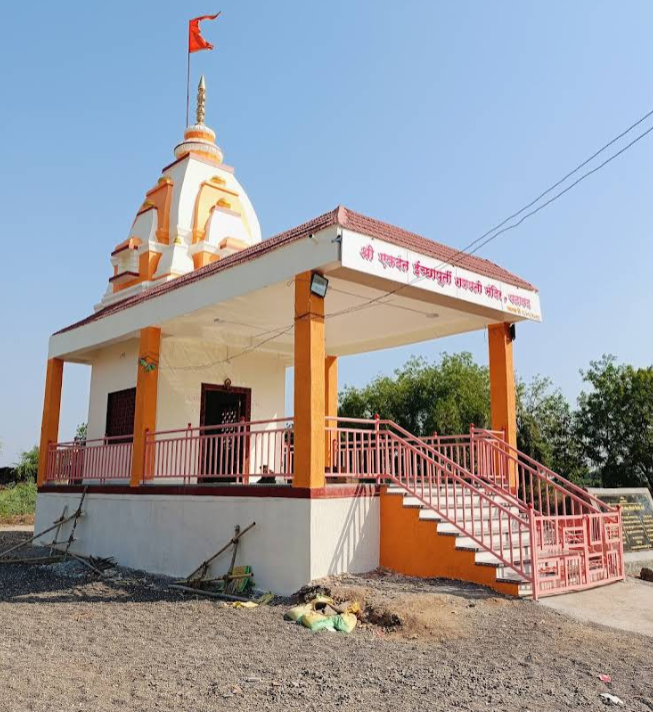
Ganpati Mandir

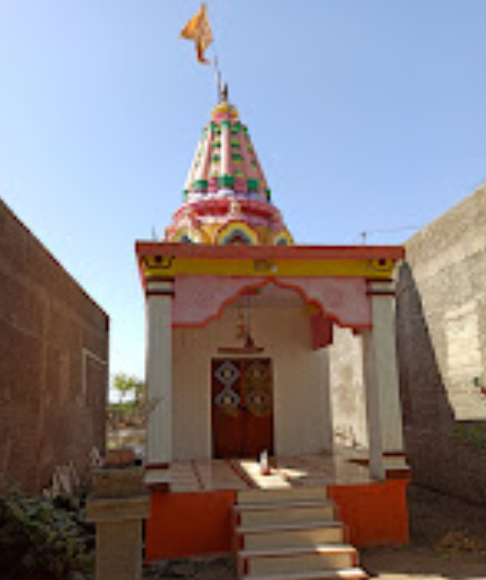
Shree Santoshi Mata Mandir

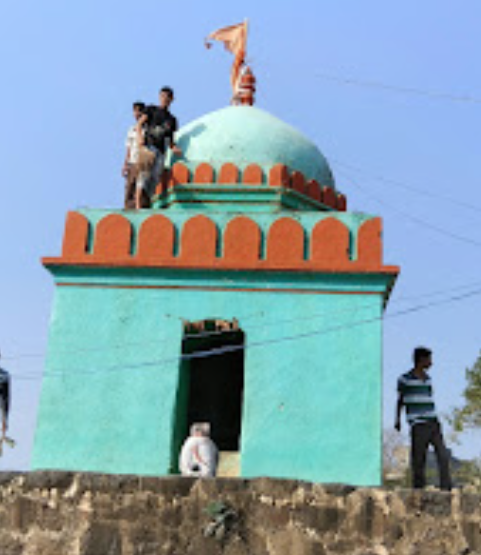
Mahadev Mandir

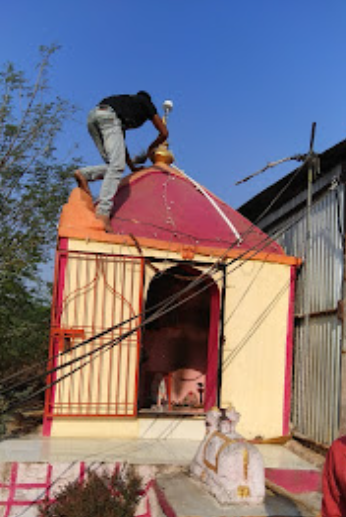
Mahadev Mandir
