= List of villages in Dhule district =

Village in Maharashtra

Below is the list of all small towns and villages of Dhule district in Maharashtra, central India, organized by administrative

== Dhule Taluka ==
Village Namejapi	Total Population	Total Male Population	Total Female Population	Sex Ratio	.	Village Name	Total Population	Total Male Population	Total Female Population	Sex Ratio
Ajang	3151	1649	1502	911		Mahal Kandamana	1155	584	571	978
Ajnale	1464	731	733	1003		Mahal Kasad	262	121	141	1165
Aklad	2120	1095	1025	936		Mahal Londha	354	179	175	978
Ambode	2897	1512	1385	916		Mahal Pandhari	8034	4150	3884	936
Amdad	1059	531	528	994		Mahal Raiwat	1137	592	545	921
Anakwadi	1732	890	842	946		Mahalmali	0	0	0	0
Anchade	1937	1014	923	910		Malane	313	155	158	1019
Anchade Tanda	768	411	357	869		Mandal	1408	726	682	939
Arni	1260	644	616	957		Mehergaon	4070	2168	1902	877
Arvi	7236	3668	3568	973		Moghan	4314	2248	2066	919
Babhulwadi	1834	986	848	860		Mohadi Pr.dangari	4471	2274	2197	966
Babre	1591	800	791	989		Morane Pr. Laling	7472	4033	3439	853
Balapur	4210	2206	2004	908		Morane Pr.ner	2926	1929	997	517
Balhane	1719	937	782	835		Mordad	1342	698	644	923
Bamburle.pr.ner.	881	469	412	878		Mordad Tanda	1608	956	652	682
Behed	1251	621	630	1014		Morshevadi	1800	946	854	903
Bendrepada	1751	909	842	926		Mukati	7826	4034	3792	940
Bhadane	3158	1592	1566	984		Nagaon Bk.	557ga0	2930	2640	901
Bhirdai	516	263	253	962		Nagaon Kh.	0	0	0	0
Bhirdane	766	397	369	929		Nakane	3023	1580	1443	913
Bhokar	2337	1284	1053	820		Nandale Bk.	2180	1117	1063	952
Biladi	3771	2042	1729	847		Nandale Kh.	720	369	351	951
Bodgaon	974	500	474	948		Nandane	3931	1998	1933	967
Boris	5243	2777	2466	888		Nandre	3212	1699	1513	891
Borkund	3615	1831	1784	974		Nane	2381	1239	1142	922
Borsule	643	325	318	978		Narvhal	2919	1558	1361	874
Borvihir	3163	1618	1545	955		Navakothare	761	411	350	852
Burzad	4108	2105	2003	952		Navalane	2077	1057	1020	965
Chande	2068	1080	988	915		Nawalnagar	1601	855	746	873
Chaugaon	4639	2390	2249	941		Nawra	1135	592	543	917
Chinchkhede	3545	1857	1688	909		Nawri	546	267	279	1045
Chinchwar/Chichwad	4436	2305	2131	925		Nikumbhe	3288	1690 23164165421654	946	
Chitod	4224	2194	2030	925		Nimdale	4649	2408	2241	931
Dahyane	1346	721	625	867		Nimgul	2940	1558	1382	887
Dapura	924	498	426	855		Nimkhedi	981	516	465	901
Dapuri	519	270	249	922		Nurnagar	934	437	497	1137
Deobhane	2637	1348	1289	956		Nyahalod	7215	3693	3522	954
Deur Bk.	5849	2989	2860	957		Padalde	1598	805	793	985
Deur Kh.	1731	880	851	967		Pimparkhede	851	440	411	934
Dhadre	2766	1453	1313	904		Pimpri	1584	811	773	953
Dhadri	1290	669	621	928		Purmepada	3098	1567	1531	977
Dhamane	2169	1125	1044	928		Rami	2186	1152	1034	898
Dhamangaon	2143	1118	1025	917		Ranmala	2526	1268	1258	992
Dhamani	43	25	18	720		Ratanpura	4516	2344	2172	927
Dhandhane	1072	554	518	935		Raver	1910	1005	905	900
Dhanur	2024	1048	976	931		Sadgaon	3370	1709	1661	972
Dhodi	246	124	122	984		Saitale	1812	915	897	980
Diwanmala	1106	589	517	878		Sanjori	1055	556	499	897
Dondwad	974	517	457	884		Sarvad	1774	898	876	976
Fagne	10217	5323	4894	919		Satarne	1508	695	713	1026
Gad-utar	2894	1606	1288	802		Saundane	2302	1187	1115	939
Gondur	3659	1913	1746	913		Savalde	818	433	385	889
Gotane	3245	1677	1568	935		Savali	516	277	239	863
Hadsuni	1430	744	686	922		Sawali Tanda	997	535	462	864
Hendrun	4626	2351	2275	968		Sayane	2636	1381	1255	909
Henkalwadi	1421	732	689	940		Shirdane Pr.ner	4450	2277	2173	954
Hingane	453	221	232	1050		Shirdhane Pr.dangari	2172	1151	1021	887
Horpada	939	455	484	1064		Shirud	8455	4341	4114	948
Isarne	1369	703	666	947		Sitane	1855	979	876	895
Japi	2790	1441	1349	936		Sonewadi	1036	547	489	894
Junnar	1338	719	619	861		Songir	13965	7083	6882	972
Junwane	2397	1256	1141	908		Sukawad Pr. Dangari	590	298	292	980
Kalkhede	2709	1460	1249	855		Sutare Pada	821	422	399	945
Kapadne	12877	6398	6479	1013		Tamaswadi	662	368	294	799
Kasvihir	706	368	338	918		Tanda (Kundane) (V)	567	301	266	884
Kauthal	1632	831	801	964		Tarwade	3762	1919	1843	960
Kawathi	2978	1572	1406	894		Tikhi	2884	1554	1330	856
Khandlai Bk.	1477	778	699	898		Tisgaon	1319	685	634	926
Khandlai Kh.	1201	630	571	906		Ubhand	1471	792	679	857
Khede	5615	2911	2704	929		Udane	4244	2312	1932	836
Khordad	2550	1331	1219	916		Vadjai	3151	1677	1474	879
Kulthe	1589	800	789	986		Vajirkhede	402	202	200	990
Kundane (velhane)	1155	587	568	968		Vani Bk	2112	1126	986	876
Kundane (warkhede)	2320	1259	1061	843		Vani Kh	98	45	53	1178
Kundane-war	3072	1552	1520	979		Varkhede	5340	2733	2607	954
Kusumbe	11079	5716	5363	938		Velhane	3044	1584	1460	922
Laling	2780	1399	1381	987		Vinchur	3762	1910	1852	970
Lamkani	6981	3649	3332	913		Vishwanath	1582	824	758	920
Lohgad	1427	723	704	974		Wadel	867	433	434	1002
Lonkhedi	5930	3835	2095	1135		Wadgaon	590	308	282	916
Lonkute	164	88	76	864		Wadne	1366	709	657	927
Mahal Kali	1217	627	590	941		War	3962	2085	1877	900

== Sakri Taluka ==
Village Name	Total Population	Total Male Population	Total Female Population	Sex Ratio	.	Village Name	Total Population	Total Male Population	Total Female Population	Sex Ratio
Aichale	4016	2080	1936	931		Kuttarkhamb	498	245	253	1033
Aine	1220	641	579	903		Kuttarmare	784	381	403	1058
Akhade	2373	1227	1146	934		Lagalwal	1169	575	594	1033
Akkalpada	1390	679	711	1047		Lakhale	365	184	181	984
Amali	3869	1965	1904	969		Lavhartodi	1822	872	950	1089
Ambapur	1177	592	585	988		Lonkhede	2207	1141	1066	934
Amkhel	1651	836	815	975		Machmal	1093	548	545	995
Amode	1494	719	775	1078		Mahir	1815	915	900	984
Ashtane	1948	979	969	990		Mahuband	1319	669	650	972
Babhulade	944	457	487	1066		Maindane	2210	1136	1074	945
Bagulnagar	438	227	211	930		Malangaon	1029	508	521	1026
Balhane	2180	1146	1034	902		Malanjan	1099	567	532	938
Balsane	4828	2502	2326	930		Malgaon Pr.warse	1052	522	530	1015
Basar	886	445	441	991		Malkhede	504	258	246	953
Basarawal	2658	1304	1354	1038		Malpur	3084	1565	1519	971
Behed	2235	1155	1080	935		Malyachapada	1206	622	584	939
Bhadane	5498	2773	2725	983		Mandane	1058	543	515	948
Bhadgaon (ma)	985	526	459	873		Manjari	3235	1411	1824	1293
Bhadgaon (u)	750	397	353	889		Mapalgaon	1073	519	554	1067
Bhagapur	288	147	141	959		Mavajipada	1155	576	579	1005
Bhamer	3425	1822	1603	880		Mhasale	1468	773	695	899
Bhondgaon	1826	947	879	928		Mhasdi Pr.ner	6885	3595	3290	915
Bhortipada	1078	528	550	1042		Mhasdi Pr.pimpalner	1305	615	690	1122
Bodakikhadi	3329	1668	1661	996		Mohagaon	1689	828	861	1040
Bodgaon	2110	1011	1099	1087		Mohane	2247	1110	1137	1024
Bopkhel	2638	1352	1286	951		Nadse	1432	738	694	940
Bramhanwel	1231	637	594	932		Nagaziri	1794	906	888	980
Burudkhe	518	246	272	1106		Nagpur (ko)	370	183	187	1022
Charanmal	2188	1072	1116	1041		Nagpur (v)	1857	944	913	967
Chaupale	875	443	432	975		Nandarakhi	2315	1209	1106	915
Chhadwel (korde)	4179	2184	1995	913		Nandwan	1427	711	716	1007
Chhadwel (p)	3972	2013	1959	973		Nawadane	1092	558	534	957
Chhail	2676	1364	1312	962		Nawapada	3300	1740	1560	897
Chhavadi	1531	790	741	938		Nawenagar	1225	577	648	1123
Chikase	2156	1087	1069	983		Nilgavhan	998	508	490	965
Chinchkhede	1469	767	702	915		Ozarade	654	324	330	1019
Chinchpada	1956	949	1007	1061		Pachale	829	433	396	915
Chipalipada	2354	1157	1197	1035		Panchmauli	1219	630	589	935
Chorwad	1075	543	532	980		Pangan	2025	1034	991	958
Dahiwel	6691	3446	3245	942		Panhalipada	704	356	348	978
Dangshirwade	1450	779	671	861		Pankheda	2002	984	1018	1035
Dapur	880	440	440	1000		Pargaon	2205	1118	1087	972
Daregaon	1237	600	637	1062		Perejpur	2225	1170	1055	902
Darkhel	636	332	304	916		Petale	771	401	370	923
Datarti	2709	1353	1356	1002		Phophade	798	405	393	970
Degaon	1605	831	774	931		Phophare	1952	953	999	1048
Deshshirwade	2280	1129	1151	1019		Pimpalgaon	2977	1456	1521	1045
Devjipada	934	447	487	1089		Pimpalgaon Kh.	1857	962	895	930
Devli Pada	1838	929	909	978		Pimpalner	23362	11958	11404	954
Dhadane	3902	2018	1884	934		Pinjar Zadi	2159	1131	1028	909
Dhamandhar	527	276	251	909		Pokare	1680	855	825	965
Dhamnar	4861	2535	2326	918		Pratappur	2441	1253	1188	948
Dhaner	1667	821	846	1030		Punajinagar	712	349	363	1040
Dhangai	661	319	342	1072		Raikot	407	201	206	1025
Dhavali Vihir	1524	751	773	1026		Raipur (N.V.)	742	383	359	937
Dholipada	1534	789	745	944		Raitel	1008	526	482	916
Dhongade Digar	2294	1203	1091	907		Ranjangaon	717	355	362	1020
Dighawe	5294	2719	2575	947		Rohan	636	325	311	957
Domkani	2218	1127	1091	968		Rohod	2238	1114	1124	1009
Dongarpada	581	297	284	956		Rojgaon	872	456	416	912
Dusane	8275	4244	4031	950		Runmali	2006	1008	998	990
Ganeshpur	1537	771	766	994		Saltek	658	343	315	918
Gangapur	1146	616	530	860		Samode	12347	6386	5961	933
Gartad	1560	765	795	1039		Satarpada	1031	515	516	1002
Gavhanipada	1061	532	529	994		Satmane	901	444	457	1029
Ghanegaon	2302	1164	1138	978		Savarimal	598	292	306	1048
Ghodade	2607	1289	1318	1022		Sayane	678	330	348	1055
Gondas	897	441	456	1034		Sayyadnagar	1050	533	517	970
Gulnare	577	292	285	976		Shelbari	1409	710	699	985
Hanumantpada	1190	595	595	1000		Shenpur	1771	899	872	970
Hatti Bk.	636	336	300	893		Shenwad	1750	875	875	1000
Hatti Kh.	5796	2971	2825	951		Shewadi	1202	575	627	1090
Hodadane	503	259	244	942		Shewage	1892	977	915	937
Ichchapur	1374	708	666	941		Shewali (D )	3378	1737	1641	945
Indawe	3392	1771	1621	915		Shewali (M )	1131	585	546	933
Isarde	496	221	275	1244		Shirsole	2057	770	1287	1671
Jaitane	12515	6427	6088	947		Shiv	1223	605	618	1021
Jamade	1642	794	848	1068		Shivajinagar	649	330	319	967
Jambhore	1116	562	554	986		Shivajinagar (N.V.)	846	428	418	977
Jamkhel	1123	575	548	953		Shivarimal	2342	1162	1180	1015
Jamki	573	285	288	1011		Sinbun	1039	527	512	972
Jayramnagar	611	309	302	977		Sitarampur	622	298	324	1087
Jebapur	1951	1017	934	918		Sukapur	5086	2598	2488	958
Jirapur	456	229	227	991		Surpan	1231	641	590	920
Kadre	3568	1833	1735	947		Sutare	1443	719	724	1007
Kadupada	1690	808	882	1092		Tamaswadi	1238	626	612	978
Kadyale	391	190	201	1058		Tembhe Pr. Warse	1386	673	713	1059
Kailasnagar	530	234	296	1265		Tembhe Pr.bhamer	543	268	275	1026
Kakani	2201	1165	1036	889		Titane	2289	1132	1157	1022
Kakarde	2107	1071	1036	967		Torankudi	1742	873	869	995
Kaksewad	1759	846	913	1079		Ubhand	1419	715	704	985
Kalamba	988	514	474	922		Ubharandi	1089	530	559	1055
Kalambhir	1356	689	667	968		Umarpata	1410	689	721	1046
Kalgaon	1093	576	517	898		Umbhare	1566	816	750	919
Kaltek	509	254	255	1004		Umbharti	1211	635	576	907
Karanjati	1192	594	598	1007		Vajadare	1038	542	496	915
Kasare	8417	4328	4089	945		Valwhe	2774	1424	1350	948
Kawathe	2836	1458	1378	945		Vardadi	683	338	345	1021
Khairkhunda	1833	902	931	1032		Vardharne	1467	730	737	1010
Khandbare	1804	940	864	919		Varsus	1054	565	489	865
Kharadbari	1711	856	855	999		Vaskhedi	1911	973	938	964
Khargaon	1310	628	682	1086		Vasmar	1709	902	807	895
Khatyal	1316	661	655	991		Vehergaon	3750	1949	1801	924
Khori	2831	1448	1383	955		Vihirgaon	759	379	380	1003
Khudane	3492	1807	1685	932		Virkhel	985	491	494	1006
Kirwade	1829	920	909	988		Vitai	2112	1040	1072	1031
Kokale	1374	709	665	938		Vitawe	1217	608	609	1002
Kokangaon	683	351	332	946		Waki	3468	1776	1692	953
Korde	1184	606	578	954		Warse	2317	1140	1177	1032
Kudashi	1268	636	632	994		Zanzale	793	396	397	1003
Kuher	1288	640	648	1013		Zirani	1256	646	610	944
Kuruswade	921	450	471	1047						

== Sindkhede Taluka ==
Village Name	Total Population	Total Male Population	Total Female Population	Sex Ratio	.	Village Name	Total Population	Total Male Population	Total Female Population	Sex Ratio
Achhi	1056	531	525	989		Malpur	9817	5067	4750	937
Ajande Bk	1392	713	679	952		Mandal	2258	1197	1061	886
Ajande Kh	1159	571	588	1030		Mandane	1305	672	633	942
Akadse	740	376	364	968		Melane	826	428	398	930
Akkadse	913	496	417	841		Methi	3646	1894	1752	925
Alane	538	278	260	935		Mhalsar	1941	1034	907	877
Amalathe	1978	1037	941	907		Mudawad	2441	1243	1198	964
Amarale	2094	1080	1014	939		Mukati	2429	1227	1202	980
Anjanvihire	2090	1087	1003	923		Nardane	6609	3340	3269	979
Arave	2288	1154	1134	983		Newade	1194	640	554	866
Babhalde	1078	575	503	875		Nimgul	5045	2597	2448	943
Babhulde	489	256	233	910		Nirgudi	1165	592	573	968
Bamhane	2821	1455	1366	939		Nishane	846	435	411	945
Betawad	7692	3918	3774	963		Padhawad	2200	1131	1069	945
Bhadne	2600	1329	1271	956		Parsamal	1521	755	766	1015
Bhilane D.	235	125	110	880		Parsole	1069	547	522	954
Chandgad	1027	550	477	867		Pashte	3196	1622	1574	970
Chaugaon Bk	1767	933	834	894		Patan	3882	1968	1914	973
Chaugaon Kh.	510	266	244	917		Pathare	1427	744	683	918
Chawalde	226	120	106	883		Pimparkheda	848	435	413	949
Chilane	3203	1683	1520	903		Pimprad	1892	958	934	975
Chimthane	4197	2151	2046	951		Pimpri	473	235	238	1013
Chimthawal	740	373	367	984		Rahimpur	1141	609	532	874
Chirne	1046	536	510	951		Rami	3964	2059	1905	925
Chudane	684	352	332	943		Ranjane	1918	960	958	998
Dabhashi	2009	998	1011	1013		Rewadi	1816	1039	777	748
Dabli	1412	745	667	895		Rohane	2100	1067	1033	968
Dalwade P. Nandurbar	1519	768	751	978		Rudane	278	133	145	1090
Dalwade P.s.	792	408	384	941		Sahur	785	396	389	982
Dangurne	1624	819	805	983		Salwe	2724	1405	1319	939
Darana	1568	814	754	926		Sarwe	997	500	497	994
Darkheda	859	437	422	966		Satare	1021	524	497	948
Daswel	1342	726	616	848		Shewade	4641	2357	2284	952.5
Dattane	1230	647	583	901		Shindkhede	24566	12709	11857	933
Daul	2289	1167	1122	961		Shirale	182	102	80	784
Degaon	2525	1253	1272	1015		Sondale	981	655	326	498
Devi	1730	863	867	1005		Sonewadi	1392	711	681	958
Dhamane	3129	1619	1510	933		Sonshelu	1094	563	531	943
Dhandarne	1151	593	558	941		Sukwad	1120	561	559	996
Dhawde	2150	1086	1064	980		Sulwade	1202	645	557	864
Dongargaon	1270	649	621	957		Suray	2486	1284	1202	936
Gavhane	1185	596	589	988		Takarkhede	2383	1241	1142	920
Ghusre	171	85	86	1012		Tamthre	2364	1219	1145	939
Gorane	1363	701	662	944		Tavkhede P.b.	1900	1055	845	801
Hatnur	3043	1563	1480	947		Tavkhede P.n.	1977	1022	955	934
Hispur	554	275	279	1015		Temlay	712	363	349	961
Hol P.b.	3020	1531	1489	973		Vadade	515	266	249	936
Humbarde	954	479	475	992		Vadli	629	314	315	1003
Jakhane	1218	623	595	955		Vadode	329	159	170	1069
Jasane	628	324	304	938		Vaghode	1078	524	554	1057
Jatode	1499	729	770	1056		Vaipur	1802	921	881	957
Jogshelu	994	533	461	865		Valkhede	3237	1656	1581	955
Kadane	1510	768	742	966		Vani	915	495	420	848
Kalgaon	581	279	302	1082		Varshi	5152	2784	2368	851
Kalmadi	2128	1104	1024	928		Varsus	1312	662	650	982
Kalwade	412	215	197	916		Varul	1763	888	875	985
Kamkhede	2239	1157	1082	935		Varzadi	2593	1315	1278	972
Kampur	1053	545	508	932		Vasamane	449	232	217	935
Kanchanpur	1558	765	793	1037		Vikhram	3903	2026	1877	926
Karle	3185	1662	1523	916		Vikhurle	839	417	422	1012
Khalane	4893	2535	2358	930		Vikwel	471	240	231	963
Kharde Bk.	2817	1456	1361	935		Virdel	3573	1846	1727	936
Kodade	1933	1009	924	916		Vitai	993	509	484	951
Kumbhare	549	284	265	933		Wadi	1328	696	632	908
Kumrej	505	257	248	965		Waghadi Bk	2236	1149	1087	946
Kurukwade	2223	1123	1100	980		Waghadi Kh	1033	531	502	945
Langhane	1221	605	616	1018		Warpade	1276	652	624	957
Lohgaon	762	389	373	959		Warud	4503	2337	2166	927
Mahalpur	798	405	393	970		Zirwe	842	432	410	949
Malich	2160	1187	973	820		Zotwade	1527	787	740	940

== Shirpur Taluka ==
Village Name	Total Population	Total Male Population	Total Female Population	Sex Ratio	.	Village Name	Total Population	Total Male Population	Total Female Population	Sex Ratio
Abhanpur Kh.	924	465	459	987		Khankheda Pr. Thalner	1538	801	737	920
Kharde	1319	670	649	969		Kharde Bk	3261	1684	1577	936
Ahilyapur	2212	1170	1042	891		Kharde Kh.	957	475	482	1015
Ajanad	3598	1881	1717	913		Kharikhan	759	366	393	1074
Ajande Bk	3378	1723	1655	961		Kodid	6101	3072	3029	986
Ajande Kh.	1224	650	574	883		Kurkhali	1636	818	818	1000
Ambe	2665	1366	1299	951		Kuwe	2437	1232	1205	978
Amode	2999	1557	1442	926		Lakadya Hanuman	2881	1446	1435	992
Anjangaon	500	245	255	1041		Lauki	1986	1006	980	974
Anturli	1977	1083	894	825		Londnare	1948	981	967	986
Arthe Bk.	3336	1698	1638	965		Mahadeo Dondwade	2481	1257	1224	974
Arthe Kh.	3929	2017	1912	948		Malapur (Anerdam)	0	0	0	0
Arunapuri Dam	0	0	0	0		Malkatar	2545	1212	1333	1100
Asali	1490	809	681	842		Mamane	3654	1896	1758	1030
Babhalaj	3442	1762	1680	953		Mandal	1447	767	680	887
Babhulde	1156	648	508	784		Manjar Bardi	282	120	162	1350
Balade	1821	982	839	854		Manjrod	4160	2133	2027	950
Balkuwe	2345	1228	1117	910		Mohida	1704	791	913	1154
Bharvade	2490	1238	1252	1011		Mukhed	1822	922	900	976
Bhatane	3203	1638	1565	955		Nandarde	1116	543	573	1055
Bhatpure	4317	2224	2093	941		Nanthe	643	335	308	919
Bhavere	2060	1048	1012	966		Natwade	1512	767	745	971
Bhilardevpada	519	253	266	1051		Nave Bhamate	1363	713	650	912
Bhoiti	3880	1966	1914	974		New Boradi	5558	2771	2787	1006
Bhorkheda	2456	1264	1192	943		Nimzari	1520	799	721	902
Bhortek	1400	734	666	907		Old Bhampur (old Bhamte)	3450	1766	1684	954
Boradi	8369	4306	4063	944		Palasner	4634	2383	2251	945
Borgaon	761	390	371	951		Panakhed	2528	1293	1235	955
Bormalipada	365	172	193	1122		Patharde	401	209	192	919
Borpani	1885	953	932	978		Pilode	2038	1022	1016	994
Budki	4904	2406	2498	1038		Pimpale	844	432	412	954
Budkivihir	1083	562	521	927		Pimpri	978	507	471	929
Chakadu	3261	1620	1641	1013		Rohini	5410	2771	2639	952
Chandase	345	164	181	1104		Rudawali	1382	715	667	933
Chandipada	884	434	450	1037		Sajgarpada	943	481	462	960
Chandpuri	1351	720	631	876		Sakvad	1082	543	539	993
Chandsurya	2098	1052	1046	994		Samaryapada	1368	695	673	968
Chilare	2336	1093	1243	1137		Sangavi	9762	5000	4762	952
Dahivad	7783	4273	3510	821		Savalade	1842	926	916	989
Devsingpada	230	117	113	966		Saver	1479	782	697	891
Dhavalivihir	1116	547	569	1040		Semalya	3003	1512	1491	986
Dondwade	1325	656	669	1020		Shingave	5283	2696	2587	960
Durbadya	2349	1177	1172	996		Subhash Nagar	2115	1056	1059	1003
Fattepur	6214	3064	3150	996		Sule	1936	958	978	1021
Gadhaddeo	3557	1799	1758	977		Tajpuri	1564	816	748	917
Gartad	1429	736	693	942		Tande	1574	840	734	874
Ghodasgaon	1055	526	529	1006		Tardi	2455	1196	1259	1053
Gidhadae	1575	798	777	974		Tarhad (Kasbe)	2687	1357	1330	980
Godi	277	141	136	965		Tarhadi Tarf Tarhad	5932	3120	2712	955
Gurhadpani	2298	1170	1128	964		Tekwade	1984	1047	937	895
Hadakhed	4812	2445	2367	968		Tembhe Bk.	1219	621	598	963
Hated	1062	529	533	1008		Tembhepada	2352	1173	1179	1005
Hedrya	1306	677	629	929		Thalner	11442	5835	5607	961
Higaon	1371	696	675	970		Tonde	3231	1652	1579	956
Hingoni	1015	518	497	959		Ukhalwadi	452	228	224	982
Hingoni Bk	1329	682	647	949		Umarda	3261	1615	1646	1019
Hisale	4365	2326	2039	877		Untawad	2659	1384	1275	921
Hivarkheda	1370	700	670	957		Uparpind	879	449	430	958
Hol	3859	1969	1890	960		Vadle Kh	943	494	449	909
Jaitpur	697	356	341	958		Vakwad	3697	1836	1861	1014
Jalod	3519	1798	1721	957		Vanaval	2563	1329	1234	929
Jamnyapada	1296	629	667	1060		Varul	2369	1182	1187	1004
Japore	1316	676	640	947		Varzadi	3547	1820	1727	949
Jatode	2447	1264	1183	936		Vikharan Bk.	4310	2202	2108	957
Javkhede	1453	736	717	974		Vikharan Kh.	1137	583	554	950
Joyada	3390	1712	1678	980		Wadi Bk	3700	1876	1824	972
Kakadmal	436	212	224	1057		Wadi Kh.	1292	642	650	1012
Kalapani	762	367	395	1076		Waghadi	6002	3106	2896	932
Kalmasare	2160	1100	1060	964		Waghbarda	271	128	143	1117
Karvand	4756	2447	2309	944		Wakapada	1842	936	906	968
Khairkhuti	2823	1396	1427	1022		Wasardi	915	502	413	823
Khambale	3956	2008	1948	970		Wathode	2072	1053	1019	968
Khamkhede Pr. Ambe	2255	1161	1094	942		Zende-anjan	2357	1160	1197	1032

== See also ==
- Dhule City
- Dhule District
- List of districts of Maharashtra
- Maharashtra
