= Shirpur Airstrip =

Private airport in Maharashtra, India

Shirpur Airport
- IATA: none; ICAO: none

Summary
- Airport type: Private
- Owner/Operator: Shirpur Gold Refinery
- Serves: Dhule
- Elevation AMSL: 602 ft / 183 m
- Coordinates: 21.32399940490723°N 74.95673370361328°E
- Interactive map of Shirpur Airport

Runways
Direction	Length		Surface
Direction	ft	m	Surface
09/27	4,300	1,311	Asphalt

Shirpur airstrip is a small airstrip located in Dhule district in the state of Maharashtra, India. It is not open to the public and is owned and operated by the Shirpur Gold Refinery.

== Specifications ==
The Shirpur Airstrip is located at an elevation of 602 ft (183 m). The runway at this airstrip is 4,300 ft (1,300 m) long with a usable length 4,000 ft (1,200 m). The direction of the runway is 09/27. The airstrip is privately owned and operated by the Shirpur Gold Refinery. The runway serves the Tande district in Dhule, Maharashtra.
