= Waghadi =

Village in Maharashtra

Waghadi Vaghadi
- village
- Location in Maharashtra, India Waghadi (India)
- Coordinates: 21°22′34″N 74°51′21″E
- Country: India
- State: Maharashtra
- District: Dhule
- Taluka: Shirpur

Population (2011)
  - Total: 1,014

Languages marathi&.khandheshi
  - Official: Marathi
- Time zone: UTC+5:30 (IST)
- PIN: 425405
- Vehicle registration: MH 18

Waghadi (Vaghadi) is a village in Shirpur Taluka, Dhule district, Maharashtra, India. It is located just northeast of the city of Shirpur on Route 4. As of 2011 it had a population of 1014, 80% of whom belonged to Scheduled Tribes.

== Places of worship ==
The village has several places of worship:

- Narmadeshwar Mahadev Temple (Waghadi)
- Bhavani Mata Temple (Waghadi)
- Guru Datta Mandir (Waghadi)
- Mari Mata Mandir Pandhari (Waghadi)
- Shahid Vir Putra Sanjay Mali Statue Pandhari (Waghadi)
- Sri Krishna Temple (Waghadi)
- Maruti Temple (Maruti Madir)
- Mahatma jotirao phule Castle
- Chhatrapati Shivaji Maharaj Statue
- Baba Pir Mosque
