= Chinchkhede =

Village in Maharashtra

- Village
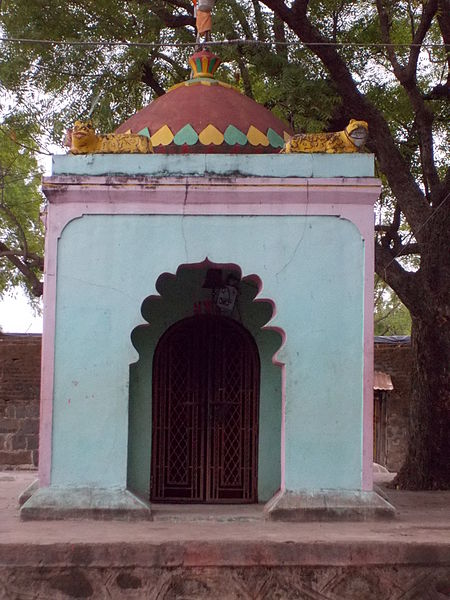

- Location in Dhule, Maharashtra, India Chinchkhede (India)
- Coordinates: 20°52′59″N 74°52′11″E
- Country: India
- State: Maharashtra
- Region: West India
- Division: Nashik Division
- District: Dhule
- Talukas: Dhule
- Settled: 1674s

Government
  - Type: Grampanchayat
  - Head of Grampanchayat: Sarpanch

Population (2001)
  - Total: 3,313
- Demonym: Chinchkhedyache

Languages
  - Official: Marathi
  - Local: Ahirani
- Time zone: UTC+5:30 (IST)
- Pin Code: 424301
- Telephone code: 02562
- Vehicle registration: MH 18
- Climate: Tropical wet and dry (Köppen)
- Avg. summer temp.: 42 °C (108 °F)
- Avg. winter temp.: 12 °C (54 °F)

Chinchakhede is a village in India, Located in the north-west region of the Maharashtra state in Dhule district. Near banks of river 'Kanher'. Agriculture and Animal husbandry is main source of income for the village. It is located 1,128 km from national capital Delhi, 288 km distance from its State Capital Mumbai & 22 km from district place Dhule.

== Administration ==
'Grampnchayat of Chinchakhede' is playing main role in Chinchakhede's administration. There are 11 seats in 'Grampnchayat' for 'Grampnchayat Member'.

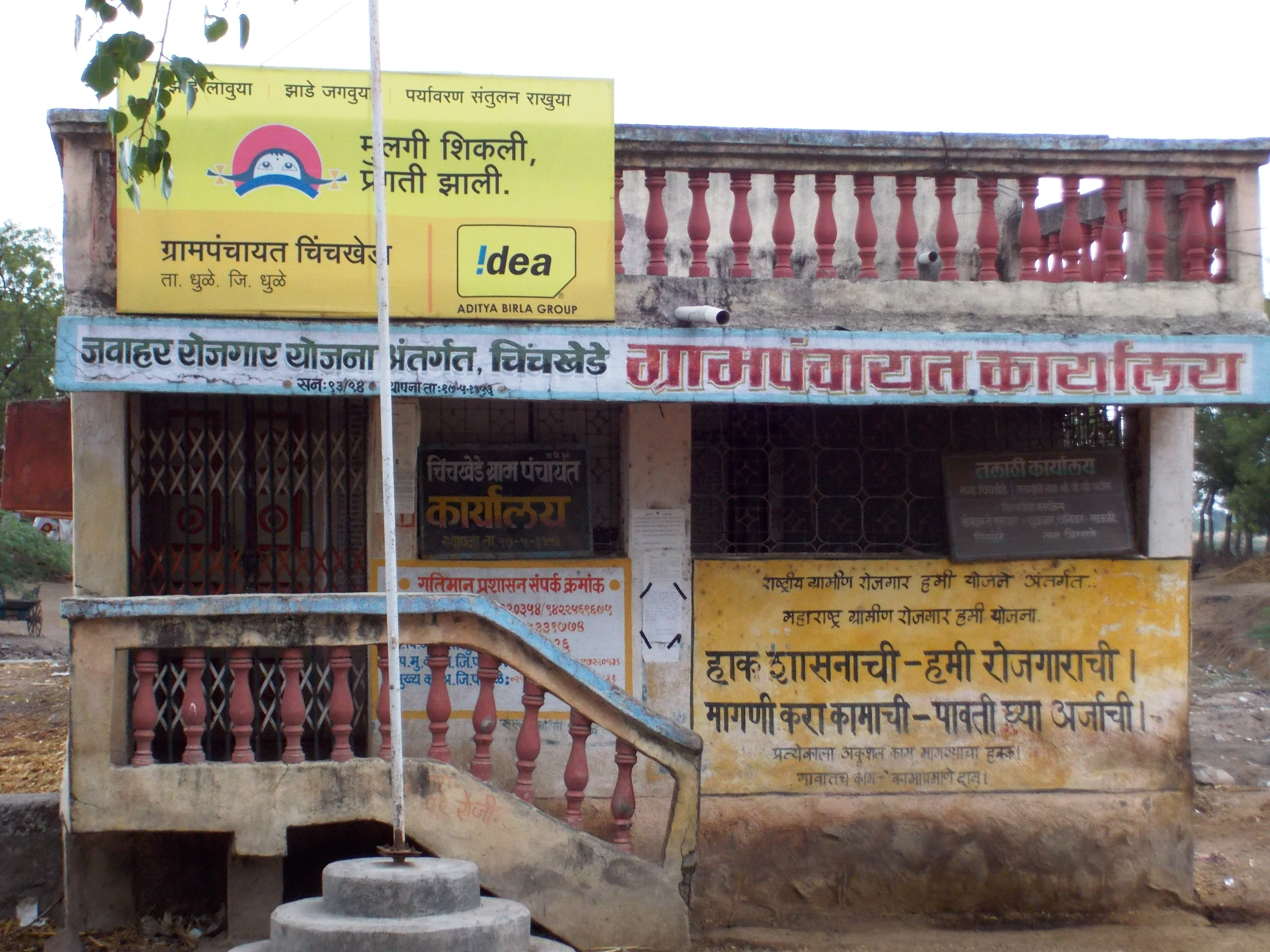
Grampanchayat office of Chinchkhede

== Demographics ==
The total population of the village is 3313. In which 1750 are Males and 1563 are Females.

== Agriculture ==
Agriculture is the main business, It includes crop production (farming and contract farming), seed supply, agrichemicals, breeding, farm machinery, distribution, processing, marketing, and retail sales. There are mainly two season of crop production 1. Khareep (At the starting time of Mansoon season) 2. Rubby (At the start of Winter season) Following are the few main crop harvest in Chinchkhede

- Cotton
- Bajara
- Wheat
- Chilly
- Corn

== Festivals ==
Diwali, Dussera, Gudhipadwa, Holi, Makarsankranti are the main festivals in the Chinchakhede. The utsav of goodies 'Kanabai/Kanubai' is also celebrated on alternate years

== Education ==
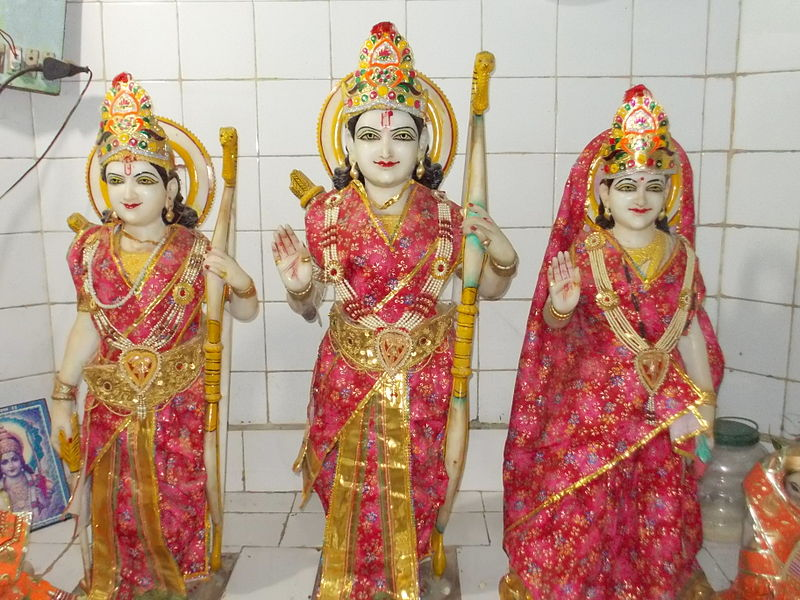
Inside picture of Ram mandir, Chinchkhede, Tal. & Dist. Dhule

The provision of education is up to 12th class in Chinchkhede. The Primary education is given by Zila Parishad's School, 'Jeevan Shikshan Vidya Mandir, Chinchkhede'. The Secondary and Higher-Secondary education is given by Gramvikas Shikshan Sanstha's, 'Jai Bhavani Madhyamik Vidyala, Chinchkhede'. To get the education students are come from other villages around Chinchkhede like Aanchale, Aanchale-Tanda, Aamdad, Savali.

Other villages near by Chinchkhede: Ajang, Anchade, Amdad, Bhirdai (Big), Bhirdai (Small), Kalkhede, Mukati, Savali.

Towns near by Chinchkhede: Amalner, Parola, Shindkhede (41.1 km), Sakri (49.4 km), Shirpur (51.4 km)

== See also ==
- Dhule District
- List of villages in Dhule District
- List of districts of Maharashtra
- Maharashtra
