= Amdad =

Village in Maharashtra

Coordinates: 20°50′N 74°54′E

- village
- Interactive map of Amdad
- Country: India
- State: Maharashtra
- District: Dhule
- Talukas: Dhule

Languages
  - Official: Marathi
- Time zone: UTC+5:30 (IST)

Amdad is a small village in the state of Maharashtra, India. It is located in the Dhule taluka of Dhule District in Maharashtra. As of 2011, there are about 180 households and about 1000 people live in this village.

== See also ==
- Dhule District
- List of villages in Dhule District
- List of districts of Maharashtra
- Maharashtra
