= Ajang =

Village in Maharashtra

- village
- Location in Maharashtra, India Ajang (India)
- Coordinates: 20.881188°N 74.890108°E
- Country: India
- State: Maharashtra
- District: Dhule
- Talukas: Dhule

Population (2001)
  - Total: 4,000

Languages
  - Official: Marathi
- Time zone: UTC+5:30 (IST)
- PIN: 424301
- Vehicle registration: mh-18
- Nearest city: Dhule
- Sex ratio: Male-48%& female-52% ♂/♀
- Literacy: 60%%
- Lok Sabha constituency: Dhule
- Vidhan Sabha constituency: Dhule
- Climate: clean (Köppen)

Ajang is a small village in the state of Maharashtra, India. It is located in the Dhule taluka of Dhule District in Maharashtra.

== Demographics ==
The village of Ajang has an extremely high ratio of resident dentists, compared to other villages in the region.

== See also ==
- Dhule District
- List of villages in Dhule District
- List of districts of Maharashtra
- Maharashtra
