= Shirpur-Warwade =

- city
- Location in Maharashtra, India
- Coordinates: 21.35°N 74.8833°E
- Country: India
- State: Maharashtra
- District: Dhule

Population (2011)
  - Total: 76,905

Languages
  - Official: Marathi
- Time zone: UTC+5:30 (IST)

Shirpur-Warwade is a city and a municipal council in Dhule district in the Indian state of Maharashtra. Shirpur is the developing city in North Maharashtra. It is famous for Balaji Temple, Priydarshini Sahakari Soot Girani, Shirpur Gold Refinery and the Educational campus. It is represented by G.D.Mali, Vyankatrao Randheer, Indrasing, Sambhaji Patil, Shivajirao Patil, Amrishbhai Patel as MLAs. Mr Patel changed the look of this area.His work regarding Water Conservation get publicity over the Maharashtra and whole the country also with the name " Shirpur Pattern ". This area is populated by Adivasis and Patils.

== Educational Institutes ==
- S .P. D .M. College of Arts, Commerce & Science.
- P. B. M. Highschool & Jr. College.
- Mahatma Jyotiba phule Highschool.
- R. C Patel Highschool.
- R. C Patel College of Education.
- R .C Patel Institute Of Technology ( Engineering College).
- R. C Patel Polytechnic (Diploma in Engineering).
- C.T.F Textile College.

== Demographics ==
As of 2011 India census, Shirpur-Warwade had a population of 76,905.

Year	Male	Female	Total Population	Change	Religion (%)							
Year	Male	Female	Total Population	Change	Hindu	Muslim	Christian	Sikhs	Buddhist	Jain	Other religions and persuasions	Religion not stated
2011	40235	36670	76905	-	78.697	18.727	0.166	0.052	0.436	1.755	0.008	0.159
