= Amalthe =

Village in Maharashtra

- village
- Location in Maharashtra, India Amalthe (India)
- Coordinates: 21.356147°N 74.751116°E
- Country: India
- State: Maharashtra
- District: Dhule

Government
  - Type: Grampanchayat

Languages
  - Official: Marathi
- Time zone: UTC+5:30 (IST)
- Vehicle registration: MH-18

Amalthe is a village situated in the Dhule district of the Indian state Maharashtra. It is located on the bank of the Tapti River, about 9 km north of Shindkheda town. Marathi is the mainly spoken language in the village.
