= Kapadne =

Village in Maharashtra

- Town
- Location in Maharashtra, India Kapadne (India)
- Coordinates: 21.032196°N 74.807439°E
- Country: India
- State: Maharashtra
- Region: West India
- Division: Nashik Division
- District: Dhule
- Talukas: Dhule

Languages
  - Official: Marathi
- Time zone: UTC+5:30 (IST)
- PIN: 424307
- Nearest city: Dhule

Kapadne is a town in the state of Maharashtra, India. It is located in the Dhule taluka of Dhule district in Maharashtra. It is one of major towns in the district.

== Website Link ==
http://www.kapadane.in

== Location ==
Kapadne is located near the NH-3. It is 2 km far from NH-3.

== Demographics ==
As of 2011 census, Kapadne had a population of 12877 with 6398males and 6479 females.

== Transport ==
=== Rail ===
Kapadne has no railway station of its own, the closest railway station is Dhule which is 15 km from the village.

=== Road ===
Kapadne is connected by the Maharashtra State Road Transport Corporation (M.S.R.T.C). A number of private auto rickshaws and jeeps ply between kapadne to devbhane and towards dhule. They are mostly operated by self-employed youth of village. kapadne boasts to have about tractors and trucks. They are used to transport agricultural produce- Cotton, Onions, Ground nut, cereals etc. to markets at Dhule, Jalgaon, Indore, Surat etc. Tractors are used for agricultural works also.

=== Air ===
Kapadne has no airport of its own, the closest airport is at Dhule.

== See also ==
List of villages in Dhule District
