= Chaugaon =

Village in Maharashtra, India

Chaugaon Chaugaon Gotane
- Village
- Location in Maharashtra, India Chaugaon (India)
- Coordinates: 20.87°N 74.58°E
- Country: India
- State: Maharashtra
- Region: West India
- Division: Nashik Division
- District: Dhule
- Talukas: Dhule

Population (2011)
  - Total: 4,639

Languages
  - Official: Marathi
- Time zone: UTC+5:30 (IST)
- Nearest city: Dhule
- Sex ratio: 106:100♂/♀
- Literacy: 70%
- Distance from Kusumbe: 5 km (3.1 mi) north (by road)

Chaugaon is a small village in the state of Maharashtra, India. It is located in Dhule taluka of Dhule district on Maharashtra State Highway 10 (MH SH 10).

It is located 98 km towards North from District headquarters Nashik. Ajmer Soundane (4 km), Bhakshi (6 km), Mulane (6 km), Morenagar (6 km), and Arai (6 km) are the nearby Villages to Chaugaon.

== Etymology ==
There are four villages with the name "Chaugaon" in Dhule district, which are located in the talukas (administrative districts) of Dhule, Sindkheda, Sakri, and Shirpur. The village in Dhule taluka is commonly referred to as "Chaugaon-Gotane" to differentiate it from the others.

== Geography ==
Chaugaon has a total area of 3,761.82 hectares (9,296 acres). 2,700 ha (6,672 acres) of land are used for agriculture, of which 900 ha (2,200 acres) are irrigated and 1,800 ha (4,400 acres) rainfed. Another 285.82 ha (706 acres) are forested, and the remaining area comprises buildings, roadways, paths, streams, and rocky outcrops.

The geography is a mixture of hills to plains. Hills are present in the forest areas, which also contain plateaus and numerous streams. The cultivated areas are made of level fields to facilitate flood irrigation; some of the rainfed land is undulating.

Soil types vary from vertisol (known as "black cotton") to laterite. Soil is generally vertisol in flatter areas and reddish to buff in colour along gentle slopes. The soils tend to be reddish, with a high proportion of laterite in areas that are exposed. In both these soils and steep slopes, underlying rock is exposed. The depth of the soil varies from a few centimetres to twenty metres (66 ft).

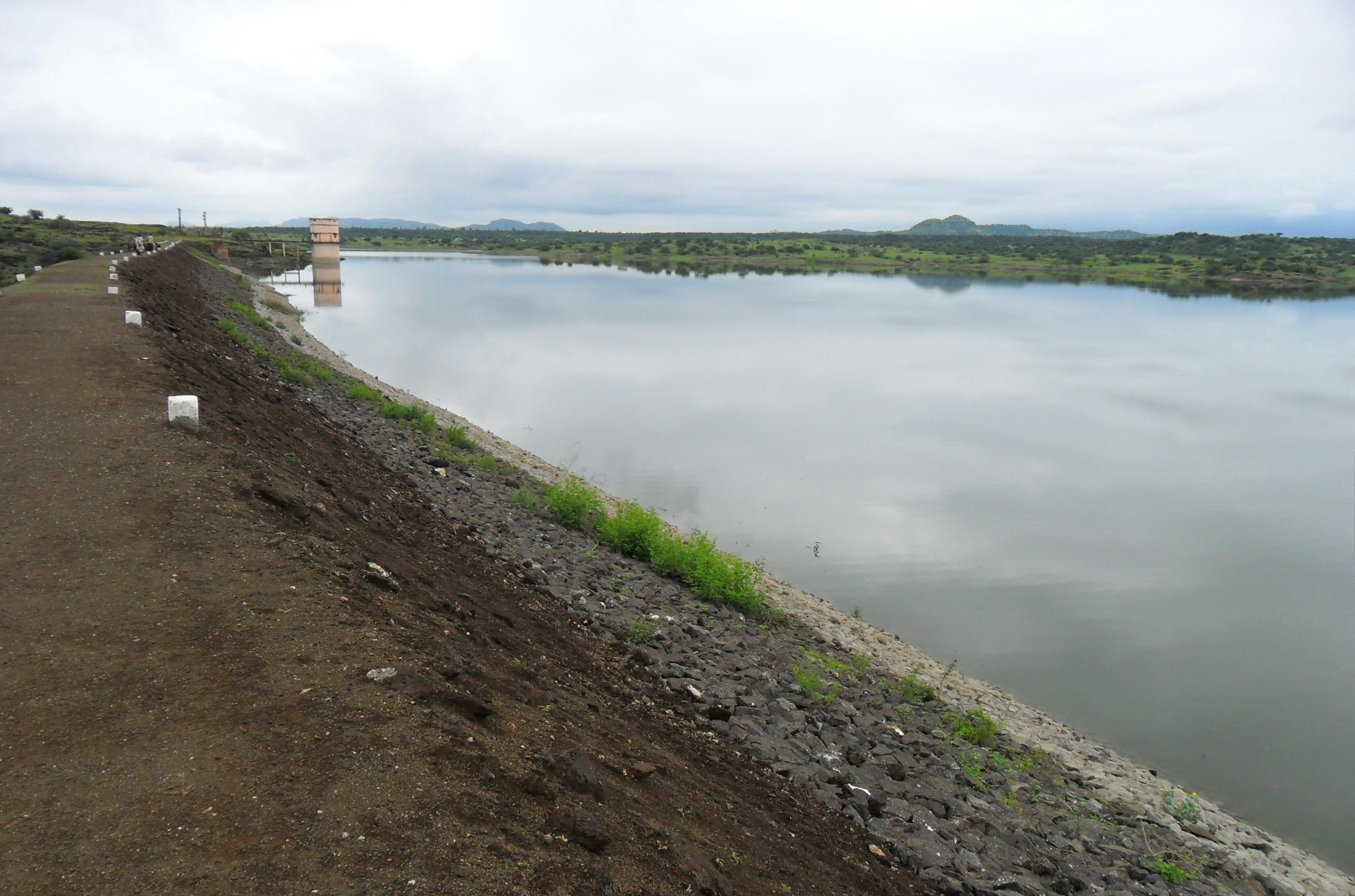
Minor irrigation tank on the Iraas river at Chaugaon

The village is located near several bodies of water: the Iraas, a small river known as the "Hiraasan" in state records; and two small streams, the Waghad and the Bhalkhai. There is a small irrigation reservoir on the Iraas river and two percolation reservoirs on the Waghad and Bhalkhai streams. The stored water has little volume and questionable quality, but is considered acceptable for drinking and other domestic uses.

The total forest area is 739.144 ha (1,826 acres), of which 285.79 ha (706 acres) is assigned to the Joint Forest Management Committee (JFMC) of Chaugaon. Compartment numbers in the forest records identify the parts of the forest area like survey numbers in land records. Chaugaon's JFMC number is 173. The entire forest area is vested in the state government of Maharashtra.

Small populations of wild animals such as blackbuck, fox, hare, hyena, wolf, and wild boar live in the forest. There were leopard sightings reported during 2013 and 2014, and villagers living along the forest boundary have reported leopard attacks on their cattle. Killings of large domestic animals like bulls, buffaloes, and their young are reported to have increased since early 2018. Although the state government compensates people for loss of property, villagers rarely make claims due to the remoteness and non-availability of local staff, and bureaucratic complexities.

== Climate ==
Chaugaon has three distinct seasons during the year: summer, winter, and the rainy season.

The average annual maximum temperature is 35 °C (95 °F), and the yearly average minimum is 16 °C (61 °F). In the summer months of April, May and June, the daytime temperature reaches a maximum of 42 °C (108 °F); May is the hottest month. Dusty and hot winds are common during the summer months, but there are no storms. Winter is from November to mid-February when the temperature drops to a minimum of 10 °C (50 °F). There is no snowfall, but mild hailstorms occur approximately once per decade.

The rainy season occurs from mid-June through September. The average annual rainfall is 600 millimetres (24 in), most of which falls over 60 days. The nearest rain gauge station is at Dhule. Rain precipitates from monsoon winds, and showers from northeast monsoons are occasional during the winter. Dew occasionally forms on very cold days during the winter season.

Chaugaon rarely faces the problem of water scarcity for many villages in Dhule taluka. The most recent drought in Maharashtra state was during 2012–2013, and the most recent drought year before that was 1972.

During the southwest monsoon season, the humidity is generally about 70%, but the air is dry for the rest of the year. In the summer season, the relative humidity is about 20% at noon. The skies are heavily clouded during the monsoon season but mostly clear for the rest of the year.

Winds are generally light to moderate, with some strengthening in force during the summer and monsoon seasons. During the southwest monsoon season, winds are mainly southwesterly to westerly. In the post-monsoon season, winds are light and variable. In the winter and summer seasons, winds mostly come from the southwest and northwest.

== Demographics ==
At the time of the 2011 census, Chaugaon had a population of 4,639 with 2,390 males and 2,249 females. There was an average literacy rate of 59.0%; 70.2% of males were literate, and 47.1 of females were literate. One in every six members of the population was under seven years of age.

== Government and politics ==
Chaugaon has a gram panchayat ("village council") for its day-to-day administration, which is grouped with the administration of Hingane, a hamlet located 3 km (1.9 mi) to the south of Chaugaon. The gram panchayat was established on 11 April 1952. The headquarters of both the district council, called the zila parishad, and the block council, called the panchayat samiti, are in the city of Dhule.

Chaugaon has no banks, but there are an agricultural cooperative, a non-agricultural cooperative, and three other credit societies.

Chaugaon has a Joint Forest Management Committee (JFMC) founded to protect, conserve, develop, and manage adjoining forests.

== Economy ==
One of Chaugaon's main industries is agriculture. Traditional crops include millet, coconut, cotton, peanuts, sorghum, onion, and wheat.

The villagers have created a water supply for irrigation by digging wells and pumping water up to their farms. Water is available at a distance of up to 6 kilometres (3.7 mi) from the village.

During the 1990s and 2000s, farmers from Chaugaon engaged in land development works without the support of government funding to bring more fallow land under cultivation. This activity, which was still ongoing in 2010, included land leveling, terracing, bunding, nalla (the modification and creation of small streams), and training.

Use of advanced farming techniques like improved seeds, drip irrigation, and chemical and organic fertilizers have led to an increase in agricultural output. In recent years, horticulture has been used for growing sugar-apple, pomegranate, and papaya.

The increased prevalence of irrigation in farmed land has led to a shortage of farm labourers, which has led in turn to a rise in wage rates. Labourers from adjoining villages such as Padalda, Ajnale, and Mehergaon have been recruited to overcome the labour shortage. There is also a greater demand for farmyard manure because many farmers practice organic farming.

Dairy farming is another major economic activity of the village. For decades, this was traditionally the profession of the Gawali community, but other communities have also taken it up. Buffaloes are reared for their milk, which is mostly sold to traders from Dhule, who also finance the purchasing of the buffaloes.

=== Village cottage industries ===
Historically, in Maharashtra, certain professions or village level services were community assigned. There are 12 such professions assigned to the 12 communities. These professions are called the 12 balute, and these communities are called 12 balutedars, which provided village-level services or labour. Through this system, the balutedar provides services of routine nature to the farmers throughout the year. Under the balute system, farmers had to make payment in kind, mostly in the form of a fixed volume of grains and other agricultural produce of food value every year after the harvest. Internal exchange of services was common. However, variations in profession have greatly increased in the 21st century with the spread of education, and economic development. There are other village industries in which all communities can engage themselves.

Tailoring has been the traditional occupation of the Shimpi community in Chaugaon. However, changes in the socio-economic conditions of the people and the increased availability of professional training mean that people from other communities have also taken up this occupation. A number of women of other communities also tailor, specializing in women's garments. Carpentry is an important cottage industry in Chaugaon, as farmers require their services for the manufacturing and repairs of new agricultural implements. Broom-making is the hereditary and traditional occupation of the Mang community.

== Culture and tourism ==
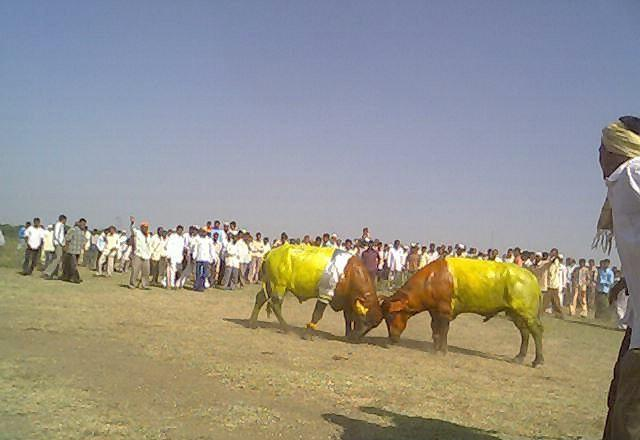
Buffalo fight at Chaugaon

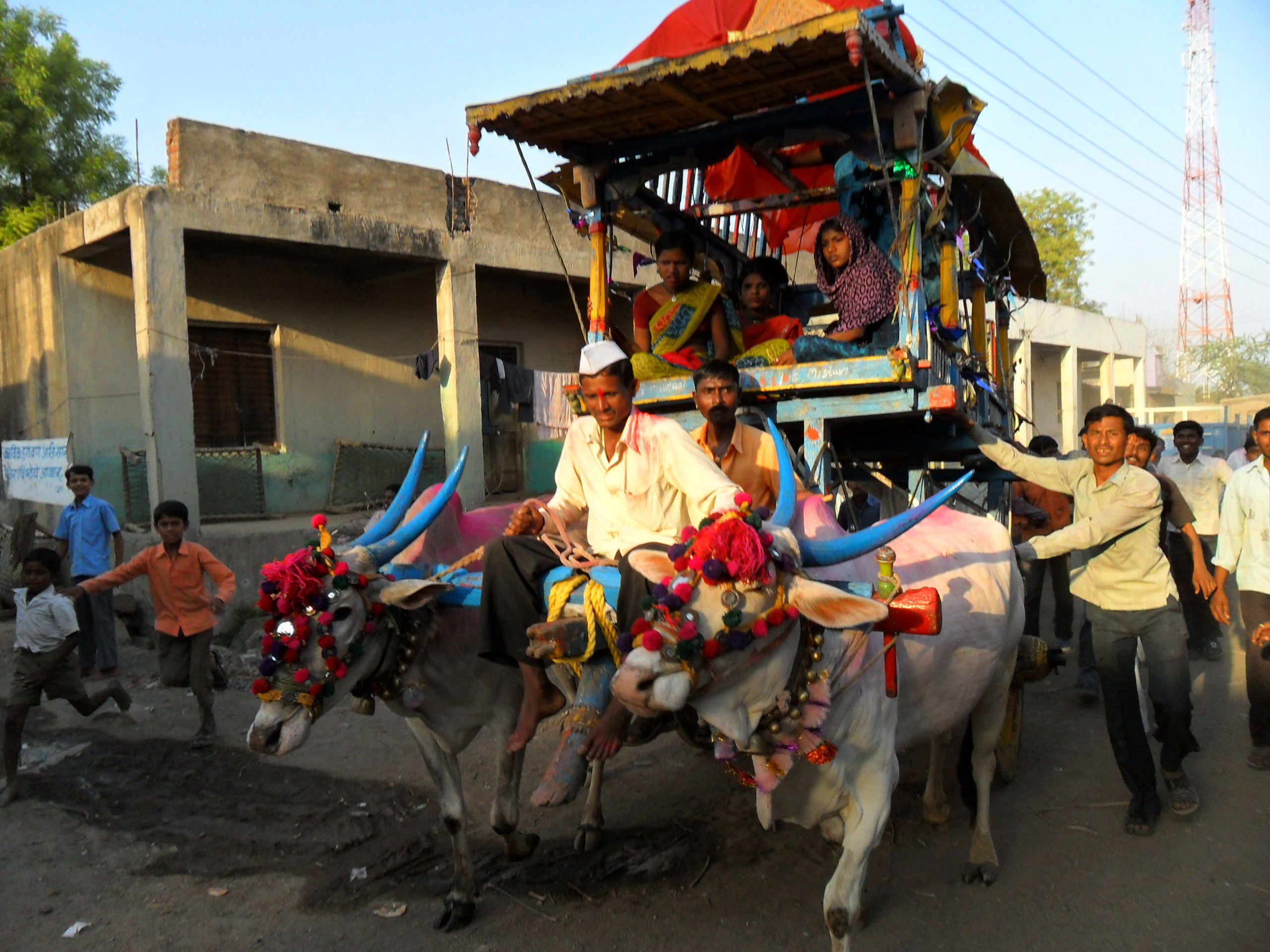
Tagatrao

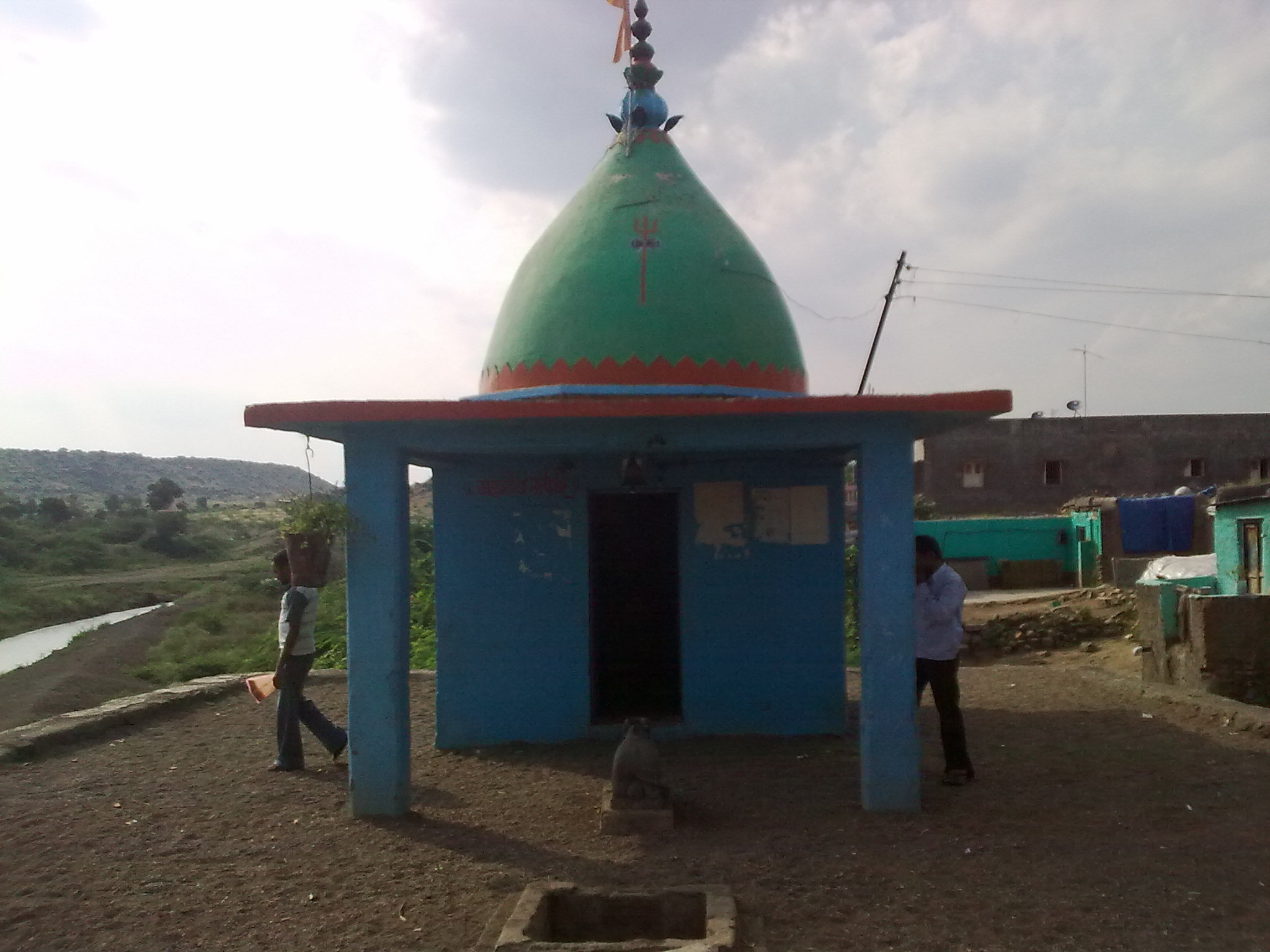
Mahadev mandir (temple) at Chaugaon

During the Diwali festival, villagers have a custom of gathering on the river banks to watch Helyachi Takkar (male bulls' head fights). The farmers raise male buffaloes to enter these fights.

The population of Chaugaon is made of various communities: Kunabi, Mali, Gawali, Bhil, Koli, Sutar, Shimpi, and Harijan. Each individual community has constructed a separate temple for its own faith or deity in or around the village settlement. The communities hold festivals that take place almost every year. Most of the other communities and sometimes other villages attend each of these festivals. These gatherings last between one day and a whole week. They include Bhajan (devotional songs), Kirtan (saint-led religious discourse), and Bhandara (community-sponsored lunch).

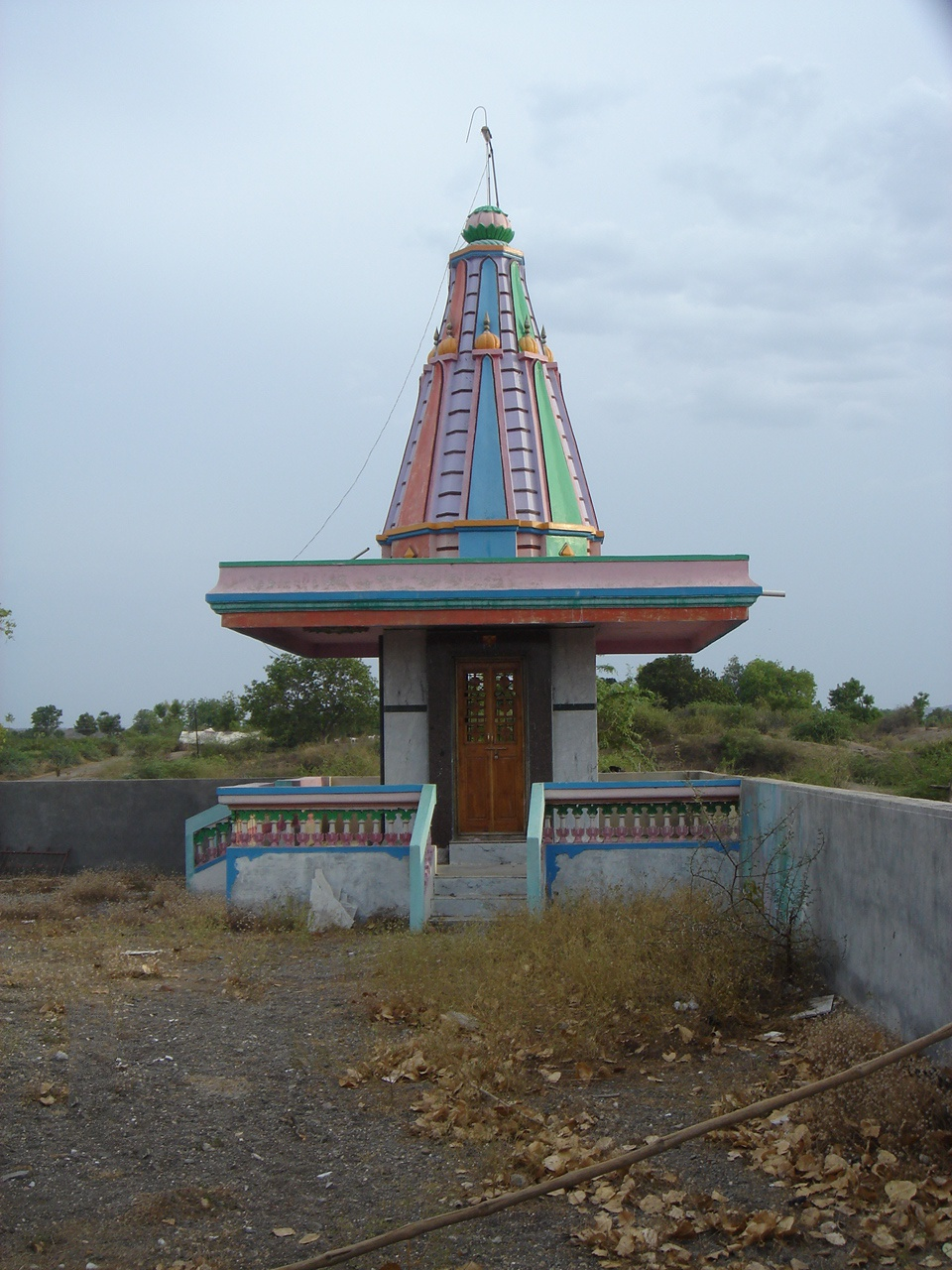
The Shimpi community's temple of Sant Namdev in Chaugaon

Chaugaon has an annual two-day fair in the month of Chaitra (March/April) of the Hindu calendar in reverence to the goddess Bhavani maata. Festivities include a tagatrao (country-made chariot), which is pulled by a pair of bulls to the temple of the goddess. Wrestling competitions are also held. On the second day there is a Tamasha, a local countryside performance of folk dance and drama.

There is also an annual community stand-alone drama performance.

=== Dress ===
In Chaugaon, like elsewhere in Maharashtra, the dress of both men and women consists of two pieces, one that covers above the waist and the other below the waist. In men, the pattern and styles of dress differ slightly between communities, but the differences are more apparent in women. Within a single community, dress varies with sex and age, while attire patterns differ between the elderly and young generations.

Men wear a type of shirt known locally as a kurta, sadra or angee that covers the body above the waist. Elderly men across all communities wear a dhotar (commonly called dhoti in Hindi), which is a long white cloth generally 4 metres long and 1.2 metres wide. Wrapped around the waist and legs, it is typically wound and tied at the waist with a knot at its corner. However, the dhotar is becoming less common among the younger generation, which prefer to wear shirts, trousers, and pajamas or pants. The kurta shirt (also called sadra or angee) has undergone changes due to fashions and styles over the years; the material has changed from coarse cotton to synthetics and blended fabrics. It is generally half-open at the front from neck to chest with buttons and half or full sleeves. Most elderly men wear full-sleeved Nehru shirts and Gandhi caps.

Women across all castes invariably wear a saadi (commonly called sari in Hindi), with a parkar (a type of petticoat) underneath and a choli (country blouse). There are two types of saadi, one 9 metres in length, preferred by the elderly, and the other 6 metres in length, preferred by the young. The manner of wearing the saadi varies considerably between different castes. Young people wear other Indian and western-style attire. Boys wear half or full pants and shirt, with or without underwear. Girls wear North Indian-style clothing, the salwar (trousers) and kamiz (tunic), or a western-style skirt and blouse or shirt.

=== Jewellery ===
Women of all communities wear glass beads, glass bangles, and gold and silver items of jewellery. Heavy silver ornaments for women are crafted by the village goldsmith, but villagers often purchase items from Dhule, where well-crafted decorative items are available in a variety of designs. Most expensive gold ornaments are seen in rich families. Along with irrigated agriculture land, valuable items of jewellery are considered to be greatly important for a family's security because they are considered insurance for times of financial crisis. Jewellery containing pearls or precious stones is never seen in Chaugaon. Less affluent girls and women tend to wear cheap costume jewellery with bright sparkling beads and earrings.

==== Men's ornaments ====
Men wear gold or silver rings of different styles and designs, sometimes embedded with semi-precious stones. Some men also wear gold chains called sonsakhali around the neck, which are generally considered an indicator of wealth. Another decorative item worn with kurta or sadra is chain-woven buttons. Some young men wear a kade, an armlet made of copper or brass. Another ornament is a bhikabali, an earring generally worn in the upper part of the earlobe on the right ear. It denotes the accomplishment of navas, a vow to the Hindu deities for the fulfilment of a prayer. Also, it is acquired not from one's own money but by using funds contributed by others as donations or gifts. There is a similar ornament worn by a few men around the ankle, called a bedi. Another item called a kargota, a work of fine silver weaving worn around the waist, is very rarely seen in modern Chaugaon.

==== Women's ornaments ====
Since the year 2000, there has been an increasing trend for women to wear gold jewellery from head to toe. This fashion has grown along with wealth, and some of the ornaments worn by Hindu women are linked to marital status. The parts of the female body that may be adorned with items of jewellery are the hair, nose, ears, neck, wrist, hand, waist, ankle, and foot.

Hair is decorated with hairpins and clips with floral or other designs, traditionally made of silver but now mostly steel or plastic.

Girls and women wear nasal ornaments on the left side of the nose, where a fine hole is pierced in the nostril. The piercing is generally made before a young girl reaches the age of ten. Girls wear nose rings made of gold, silver, or glass, with pearls on the outer surface, while adult women wear nath, nathani, and fuli. A nath is a large decorative nose ring with a distinctive shape, usually worn at ceremonial events like marriages and festivals; the nathani is a miniature version of the nath; and the fuli is a spikelike ornament with the top studded with a sparkling stone. The communities that wear nath are Kunabi (Hatkar Patil), Mali, Sutar and Nhavi, while the fuli is worn by the Gawali, Lohar, Koli, Mahar, Mang, Chambhar, and Bhil communities.

Almost every woman and girl is seen wearing some kind of earring. Older women favour traditional earrings, locally called bugadi, killu, dharani, khutaalaa, karnful, and hujur, while younger women can be seen wearing contemporary jewellery like plain or bead-laced earrings. Ornaments with real or artificial stones are fashionable among teenage girls, who also wear simple earrings called balyaa. Earrings may be worn either individually or in pairs.

The culture considers the most important piece of jewellery worn by a married woman as the mangala sutra, a gold necklace that comes in a variety of styles and designs. This is the most revered cultural item to be worn, according to Hindu tradition. Among poorer women, the mangala sutra is made of silver rather than gold. Widows are generally forbidden to wear this item of jewellery. There are various alternative gold ornaments that can adorn the neck, which are also fashionable and decorated with different artwork and designs, including the chapalahaar, ranihaar, putalyaa, wajratik, mohanmaal, and sari necklaces.

The hand is laced with silver ornaments and also decorated with bangles and rings, which come in many different designs. These are mostly fashioned from gold or rarely silver and are made by skilled craftsmen. Items of jewellery worn on the upper arm are called kade, velya, or vakya, which can be worn in addition to the baju band. For the wrist, there are ornaments called got and patlyaa. These are worn all the time in some communities, but in others they are reserved for special occasions.

The ornaments worn round the waist are called kambar patta, kambarband, aakadaa, and lachcha. Decorative items are also worn on the ankle and the foot: ornaments specifically for the ankle are paijan, kalla, tode, and saakhali pattya; and toe rings called bele, masolya, and virode are also worn, but these are only meant to be worn after marriage.

=== Food and dietary habits ===
The food of the villagers of Chaugaon is invariably spicy. The staple foods are millet and sorghum; millet is consumed more. The grains of millet and sorghum are consumed by a way of preparation called Bhakari (thick baked bread). Legume also form the important part of food; horse gram, Toor dal, Moog dal, Chawli, and Udid are consumed.

Rice is available in the open market and through the government-controlled Public Distribution System (PDS). In the 20th century, the high cost of rice caused it to be a sign of wealth. Cooked rice is called Bhaat. Blends of rice called Kichadi or Khichadi are prepared from rice and the legume Toor or Moog with spices and oil.

Vegetables and legumes are part of the daily menu. They are either grown locally or bought from weekly markets at Kusumba or Dhule. Tomatoes, brinjals, onions, Methi, okra, Gawar, and Ambaadi, are grown locally. Potatoes and cauliflower are never grown in the village and are obtained from outside.

The vegetables are cooked into a preparation called Bhaji or Shak and eaten with bhakari, a type of bread. Legumes are cooked into a preparation, Daal (Pulses) or Aamati. Daal is simply prepared and generally slightly spicy. Aamati is very spicy. Both are eaten with bhakari or cooked rice.

Consumption of fruits like bananas, pomegranates, papaya, watermelon, muskmelons, and chikoo is occasional. Other minor and seasonal fruits consumed are Karwand, jambhul, and bor. Bananas, pomegranates, papaya, and bor are grown locally.

Milk and its products like curd, buttermilk, butter, and ghee form an important part of the vegetarian diet, as milk is plentiful in the village.

Consumption of non-vegetarian food is less common. Non-vegetarian food consists of mutton, eggs, goats, and chicken. Fish is less common. Fresh fish is occasionally eaten, but dried fish called Bombil that comes from outside the village is also consumed. The majority of the population is strictly vegetarian; notable among them are the Brahmin, Gawali, and Mali communities. Non-vegetarians consume meat at celebrations or once a week.

All villagers take tea in the morning and in the afternoon. The use of milk and sugar in tea preparation is profuse.

Kadhi, a preparation made from buttermilk, salt, and spices is a favourite item in Chaugaon. Chatani is another item eaten by the villagers. It is a preparation of ground chili powder and salt. Other favourite items include homemade mango pickles and paapad. Paapad is a food made from red millet, white millet, black gram, mung bean, and rice. It is either roasted or fried.

The daily meal consists of Bhakar (bread), Bhaji or Daal or both, split onion, and groundnut chutney. All communities in the village take three meals a day. Nyahari (breakfast) is taken early in the morning before going out to work, generally before 10 A.M. The afternoon midday meal is taken at about 2 P.M. Dinner is at night between 6 and 9 P.M.

Festivals are celebrated with sweets like Puran poli, puri, shira, khir, fried paapad, kurdai, bhajee, and pakoda. At the Diwali festival, Karanji, Anararse, Ladoo, Chivada, and shev are prepared. For the Akshay trutiya festival, aamras and puran poli are eaten. Every community has its own preparations for festivals.

== Village facilities ==
=== Drinking water ===
Chaugaon has numerous drinking water facilities that are mainly available through a common tap or well. There are five wells, two hand pumps, and two electric pumps available within the village.

=== Education ===
Chaugaon has one primary school, one secondary school, and one senior secondary school. For all higher education, students must go to the larger cities nearby. There are also 32 government-funded childcare and mother-care centres (Anganwadi) within the village as part of the Integrated Child Development Services program, which was started by the Indian government to combat child hunger and malnutrition in 1975.

=== Healthcare ===
Chaugaon has a few medical facilities. There are two Ayurvedic dispensaries, one Primary Health Sub Centre and three registered private medical practitioners in the village. One is a daytime visitor; the other two are local residents. Though they are not highly qualified in the medical field, they can treat small ailments and refer patients to Dhule in the case of serious illness.

=== Communication ===
Chaugaon has its own post office, but there are no telegraph or telephone facilities within the village. Mobile phones are now a common household item. Two mobile towers were constructed in the village in 2009. It is estimated that more than 3,000 phones are in use in the village.

== Transport ==
=== Rail ===
The closest railway station is Dhule, which is 20 km from Chaugaon.

=== Road ===
Chaugaon is connected to larger cities by the Maharashtra State Road Transport Corporation buses. they travel between Dhule, Kusumba, and Malegaon. A number of private automobiles, motorized rickshaws and other vehicles go from Chaugaon to Kusumba and Malegaon. They are mostly operated by self-employed youth.

Chaugaon has about half a dozen tractors and a similar number of trucks. They are used for agriculture and to transport agricultural produce such as cotton, onions, groundnuts, and cereals to markets at Dhule, Jalgaon, Lasalgaon in Nashik district, Solapur, Surat, Bharuch, Bhopal, Indore, and more.

=== Air ===
The closest airport is at Dhule.

== See also ==
- List of villages in Dhule district
- List of districts of Maharashtra
