= Aklad =

Village in Maharashtra

- village
- Location in Maharashtra, India Aklad (India)
- Coordinates: 20°55′54.7″N 74°33′37.81″E
- Country: India
- State: Maharashtra
- District: Dhule
- Talukas: Dhule

Languages
  - Official: Marathi
- Time zone: UTC+5:30 (IST)

Aklad is a small village situated beside the Panzra river where most people speak Aahirani. The village is in the state of Maharashtra, India. It is located in the Dhule taluka of Dhule District in Maharashtra.

== See also ==
- Dhule District
- List of villages in Dhule District
- List of districts of Maharashtra
- Maharashtra
