= Manjrod =

Village in Maharashtra

- Village
- Location in Maharashtra, India Manjrod (India)
- Coordinates: 21°13′31″N 74°59′1″E
- Country: India
- State: Maharashtra
- District: Dhule

Languages
  - Official: Marathi
- Time zone: UTC+5:30 (IST)
- PIN: 421425
- Telephone code: 91-2563
- Vehicle registration: MH 18

Manjrod is a village in a Shirpur Taluka of Dhule district, Maharashtra. It is located on bank of Tapi river. Manjrod is 70 km from the city of Dhule. The major occupation of the people is agriculture with cotton as the major product.

== Transportation ==
The nearest prominent railway stations on the main route are Bhusaval and Chaalisgaon. Nardana (Taluka Sindkheda & Amalner is the nearest station. Bus service is available to Bhusaval, Gujarat and MP state.

== History ==
Due to floods of 1950-60 Manjrod (old Manjrod) was relocated to new place (new Manjrod). Ram Temple which was in old Manjrod is recently relocated to New Manjrod.

== Religion ==
Manjrod is a village of temples.
Villagers recently constructed Ram Mandir near Gram Panchayat office.
Tunnel of Ganpati is situated at the bank of Tapi river, it is said to be only tunnel of Ganpati in Maharashtra. The Ganpati idol is made of shadu mati(clay) and it is there since ages.
Shri Krishna Temple in Bombay galli is holy place for Mahanubhav followers.

== Education ==
Primary education (up to 4th Standard) : ZP school.
Secondary education (up to 10th Standard) : Mahatma Gandhi Vidyalay

== Old Manjrod Images ==
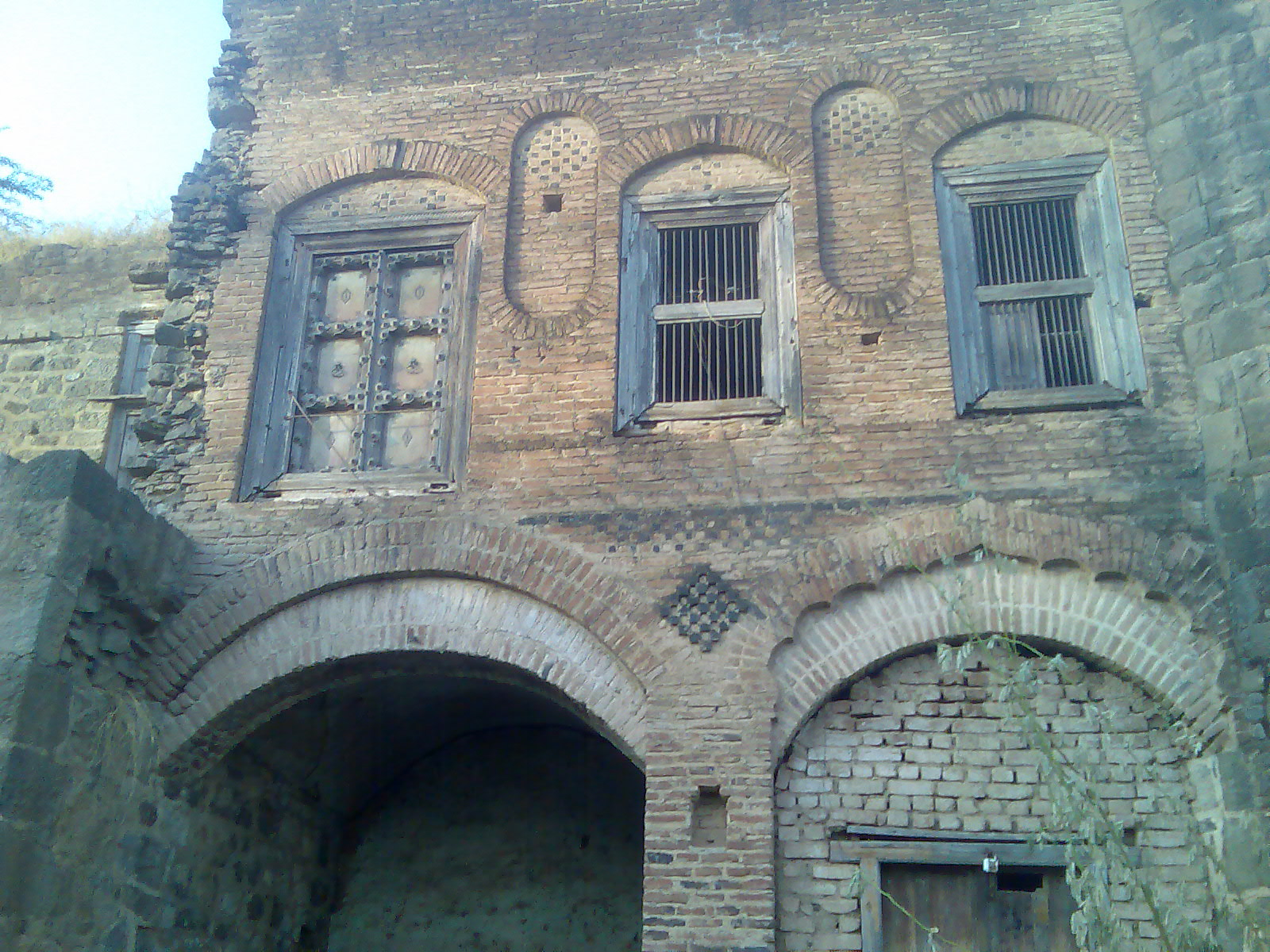

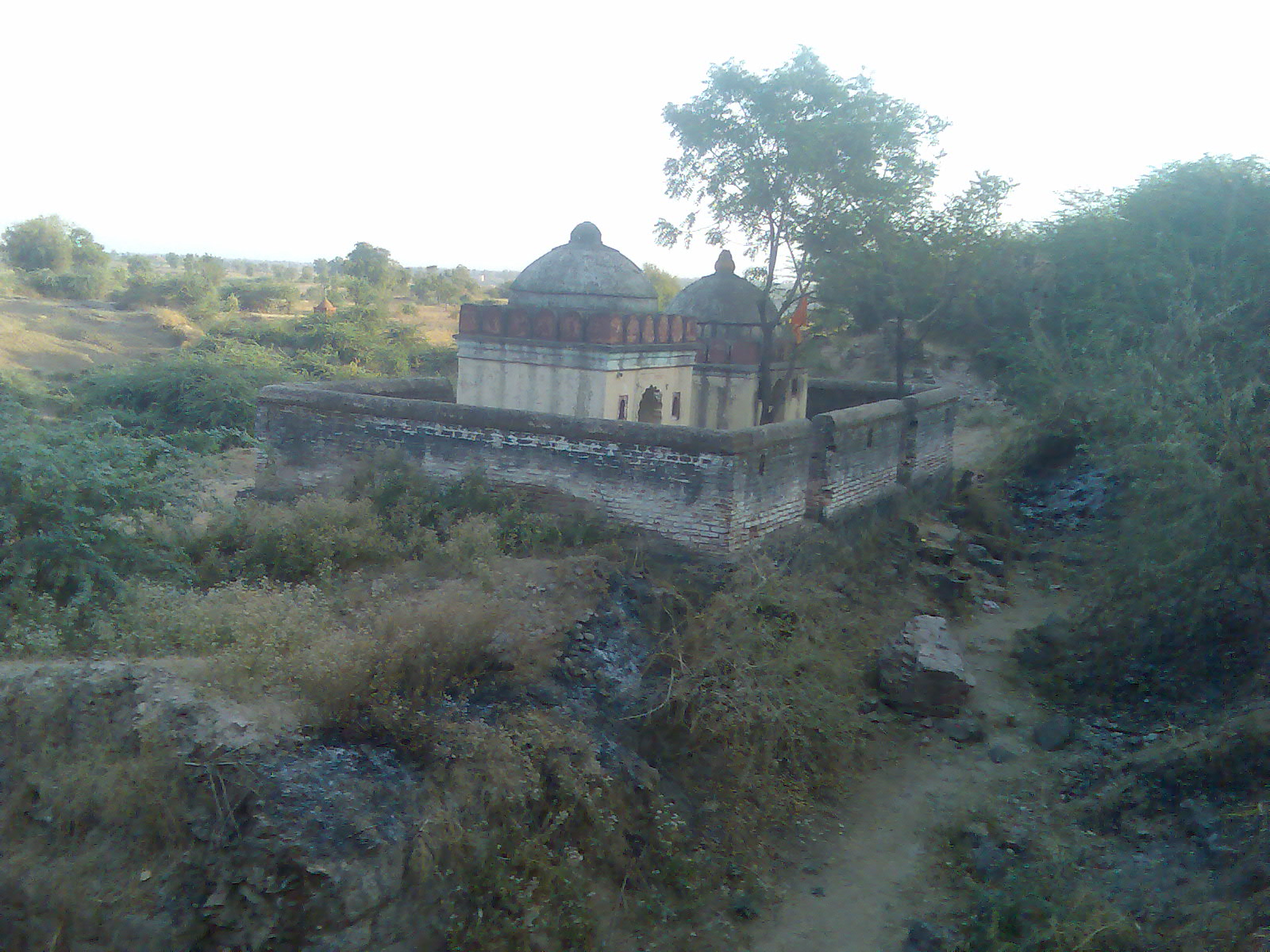

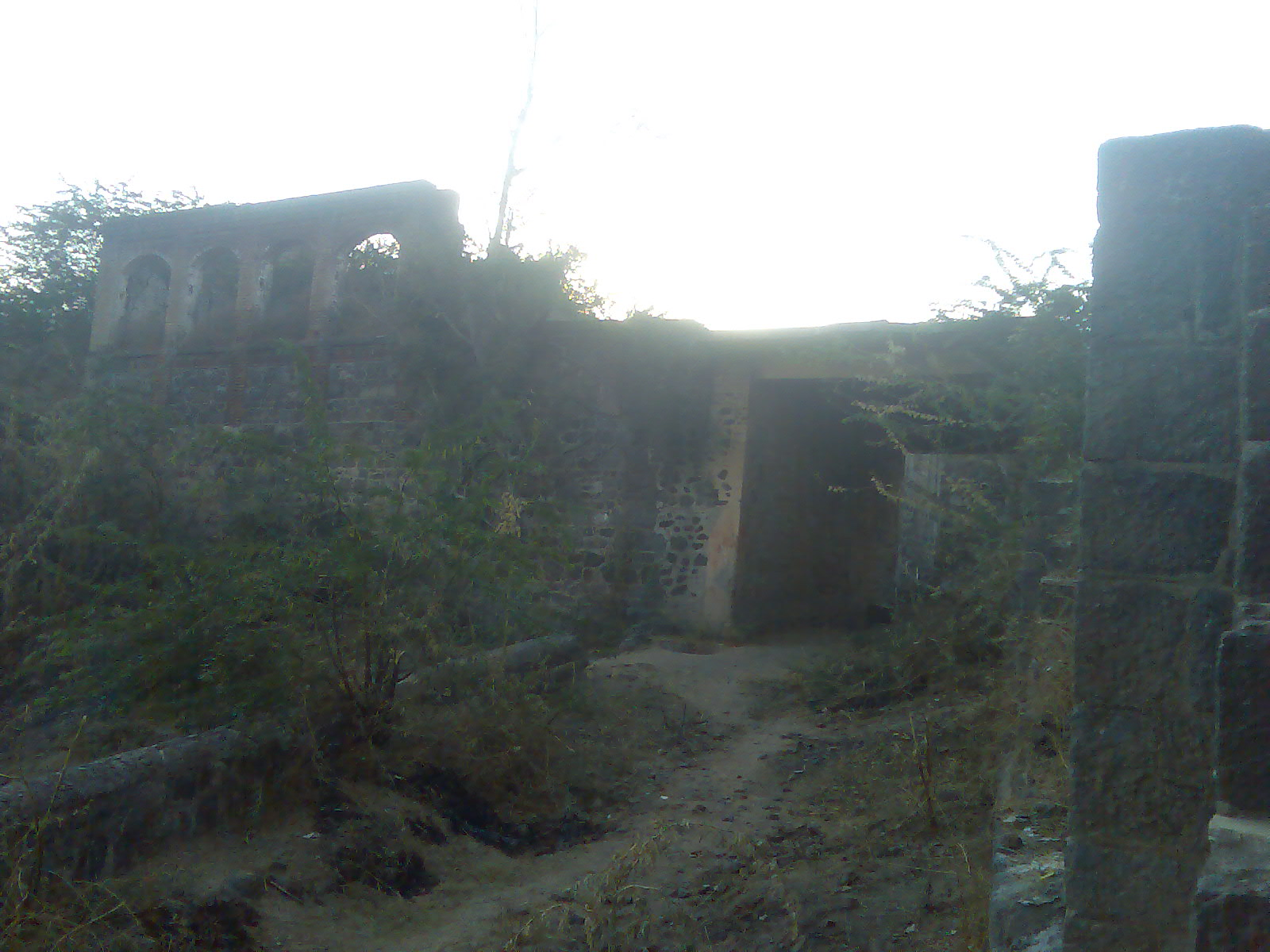

== See also ==
- Shirpur
