= Khede =

Village in Maharashtra

Aanand Khede
- village
- Location in Maharashtra, India Aanand Khede (India)
- Coordinates: 20.91°N 74.63°E
- Country: India
- State: Maharashtra
- District: Dhule
- Talukas: Dhule

Population (2001)
  - Total: 5,807

Languages
  - Official: Marathi
- Time zone: UTC+5:30 (IST)

Aanand Khede is a small village in the state of Maharashtra, India. It is located in the Dhule taluka of Dhule District in Maharashtra.

== Location ==
Anandkhede is a village located along National Highway 53 (Surat–Kolkata route) and is situated on the banks of the Panzara River.

== Demographics ==
As of 2001 census, Khede had a population of 5,807 with 2,869 males and 2,838 females. Males constitute 51% of the population and females 49%. Khede has an average literacy rate of 76.01%, higher than the national average of 59.5%. Male Literacy is 86.09%, and female literacy is 5.79%. In Khede, 12% of the population is under 6 years of age. Khede has an average birth rate of 18.84% and an average death rate of 6.02%.

There are total of 977 households in the village and the village border area is spread in the area of 2,384 hectares.

== Economy ==
Khede has a farming economy, traditional crops include Millet, Chilli, Cotton, Bhuimug, Harbhara, Jowar, Onion, Sugarcane and Wheat. Farmers rely on rain water as well as water from rivers for farming needs.

Khede farming economy is included in the states income & expenditure accounts. As for budget year 2007-2008 Khede village had accounted for an income of Rs. 1,356,897.50 whereas the total expenditure was Rs. 1,335,400.00.

== Administration ==
Anand Khede has as Village Gram Panchayat for day-to-day administration. The District Zilla Panchayat headquarters is at Dhule and the Block Panchayat is also at Dhule.

Khede has State bank of India branch Co-operative bank & agricultural credit societies, non-agricultural credit societies or other credit societies present within the village.

== Drinking water facilities ==
Khede has numerous drinking water facilities which are mainly available through a common tap or a common well. There are three wells, two hand pumps, two electric pumps and five common taps available within the village as drinking water sources.

== Education Facilities ==
Khede has one primary school, one secondary school and one higher secondary school within the village. For all higher education, village students have to go to the bigger cities close by. There are also another 2 government funded childcare and mother-care centers (Anganwadi) within the village as part of the Integrated Child Development Services program started by the Indian government to combat child hunger and malnutrition in 1975.

== Medical Facilities ==
Khede has 4 private clinics and 2 medical shops present within the village. One government hospital.

== Communication Facilities ==
Khede has a post office but there are no telegraph or telephone facilities within the village. Most inhabitants use mobile telephones to communicate; many cell towers are located in the village.

== Transport ==
=== Rail ===
Khede has no railway station of its own, the closest railway station is Dhule which is 15 km from the village.

=== Road ===
Khede is National Highway 16 Surat- Amrawati connected by the State Transport Buses that ply between Dhule, Kusumba & Malegaon.

=== Air ===
Khede has no airport of its own, the closest airport is at Dhule.

== See also ==
- Dhule City
- List of villages in Dhule District
- List of districts of Maharashtra
