= Jogshelu =

Village in Maharashtra

Coordinates: 21°18′N 74°39′E

Jogshelu is situated in Shindkheda tehsil and located in Dhule district of Maharashtra. It is one of 141 villages in Sindkhede Block, along with villages like Dalwade, Vikharan and Chaugaon. Nearby railway stations are Vikharan, Shindkheda and Dondaicha.

== See also ==
- List of villages in Dhule district
