= Udane =

Village in Maharashtra

- village
- Location in Maharashtra, India Udane (India)
- Coordinates: 20.53°N 74.38°E
- Country: India
- State: Maharashtra
- Region: West India
- Division: Nashik Division
- District: Dhule
- Talukas: Dhule

Languages
  - Official: Marathi
- Time zone: UTC+5:30 (IST)
- PIN: 424302
- Nearest city: Dhule
- Distance from Chaugaon: 7 kilometres (4.3 mi) East (Road)

Udane is a small village in the state of Maharashtra, India. It is located in the Dhule taluka of Dhule District in Maharashtra.

== Location ==
Udane is located on the Maharashtra Other District Road 98 (ODR 98).

== Climate ==
Udane has three distinct seasons during the year: summer, winter, and the rainy season.

== Demographics ==
As of 2001 census, Udane had a population of 3,312 with 1,724 males and 1,588 females.

There are total of 580 households in the village.
