= Lamkani =

Village in Maharashtra

- village
- Location in Maharashtra, India Lamkani (India)
- Coordinates: 21.09°N 74.56°E
- Country: India
- State: Maharashtra
- Region: West India
- Division: Nashik Division
- District: Dhule
- Established: 1303
- Founder: Parmar Rajputs clan
- Talukas: Dhule

Population (2001)
  - Total: 6,150

Languages
  - Official: Marathi Ahirani
- Time zone: UTC+5:30 (IST)
- Nearest city: Dhule
- Sex ratio: 968 ♂/♀

Lamkani is a small village in the state of Maharashtra, India. It is located in the Dhule taluka of Dhule District in Maharashtra. It was founded by the ancestors of Shrimant Raul Srujaansing Raje of the Parmar clan of Rajputs, the renowned Rajput Sardar in the Maratha history and close associate of Shrimant Chhatrapati Shahu, also one of the thirteen Vatandars of Khandesh, well-known in the history of Maharashtra as "Saadeybaaraa Raaul".

== Location ==
Lamkani is located on the junction of Maharashtra State Highway 10 (SH 10) and 12 (SH 12). It is located at 21^{0} 05’17.37" N 74^{0}34’08.09" E.

Lamkani can be reached from Dhule by taking National Highway (NH 3) up to Sarwad village road junction (18 km) and then taking State Highway 12 (SH 12) toward west direction that passes through Nandane, Burzad, and Boris village, finally reaching Lamkani. It is at a distance of 42 km by route, but this road is well maintained.

Alternately, Lamkani can be reached from Dhule city by Mehergaon route. One can go straight way from Dhule by State Highway 14 (SH 14) up to Mehergaon (18 km) and then taking SH 10 (15 km) that passes through Lamkani. It is at a distance of 33 km by this route and shorter by 9 km.

== Climate ==
Lamkani has three distinct seasons during the year: summer, winter, and the rainy season.

Summer months are hot and spread over April, May and June. The day time temperature reaches up to 43 ^{0} C. May is the hottest month. Dusty and hot winds of varying velocity are common during summer. Winter is spread over November to mid-February. Winter temperature drops down to minimum 10 ^{0} C. Snowfall and smog are unknown. However hailstorms of mild intensity are occasionally reported.

Rainy season starts by mid-June and lasts till September. The average annual rain fall is 350 mm spread over about 45 rainy days. The nearest rain gauge station is at Dhule. Rains are received from the South- West mansion winds. Showers from North – East mansion are very rare. Lamkani has very erratic rainfall pattern. During the rainy monsoon season the skies are moderately clouded. For the rest of the year skies are mostly clear.

During the South-West monsoon season the humidity is about 60 per cent. The air is dry during the rest of the year. The driest part of the year is of course summer when the relative humidity is about 20 per cent at the mid day.

== See also ==
- List of villages in Dhule District
- List of districts of Maharashtra
