= Betawad =

- town
- Location in Maharashtra, India
- Coordinates: 21°9′59″N 74°54′39″E
- Country: India
- State: Maharashtra
- District: Dhule

Government
  - Type: Panchayat Raj

Area
  - Total: 0.86 km^{2} (0.33 sq mi)
- Elevation: 346 m (1,135 ft)

Population (2011)
  - Total: 7,692
  - Density: 8,900/km^{2} (23,000/sq mi)

Languages
  - Official: Marathi
- Time zone: UTC+5:30 (IST)
- PIN: 425403
- Telephone code: 02566
- Vehicle registration: Mh18
- Nearest city: Dhule

Betawad is a village in Sindkheda Taluka, Dhule District of Maharashtra State, India. It belongs to the Khandesh, the Northern Maharashtra regional and Nashik Division.

It is located 27 kilometres (17 miles) to the north from District headquarters at Dhule. It is 24 km from Shindkhede and 375 km from State capital Mumbai.

The pin code for Betawad is 425403.

== Demographics ==
Betawad has a population of 7692 of which 3918 are males while 3774 are females as per the Indian Population Census of 2011.

In Betawad the population of children with age 0–6 is 909 which makes up 11.82% of total population of village. Average sex ratio of Betawad village is 963 which is higher than Maharashtra state average of 929. Child sex ratio for the Betawad as per census is 772, lower than Maharashtra average of 894.

Betawad has lower literacy rate compared to Maharashtra. In 2011, literacy rate of Betawad was 75.29% compared to 82.34% of Maharashtra. In Betawad male literacy stands at 82.35% while female literacy rate was 68.18%.

Betawad is administered by a sarpanch (head of village) who is elected representative of village.

In Betawad village out of total population, 3803 were engaged in work activities. 89.17% of workers describe their work as Main Work (Employment or Earning more than 6 Months) while 10.83% were involved in Marginal activity providing livelihood for less than 6 months. Of 3803 workers engaged in Main Work, 431 were cultivators (owner or co-owner) while 2166 were Agricultural labourer.

== Education ==
Colleges and Schools

- Shri F.M. Lalwani Vidyalaya and Junior College
- Indira Gandhi Girls High School
- Primary School (Zilla Parishad)
- Smt. Anasuyabai Ahirrao Women's College of Arts (Affiliated By S.N.D.T.)
