= Songir =

Town in Maharashtra, India

Songir Suvarngiri
- town
- Location in Maharashtra
- Coordinates: 21°05′N 74°47′E
- Country: India
- State: Maharashtra
- District: Dhule

Government
  - Body: Songir Grampanchayat

Population (2011)
  - Total: 33,000

Languages =Marathi.
- Time zone: UTC+5:30 (IST)
- PIN: 424309
- Telephone code: 02562
- Vehicle registration: MH-18
- Nearest city: Dhule
- Literacy: 80%
- Lok Sabha constituency: Dhule
- Vidhan Sabha constituency: Dhule(Gramin)
- Civic agency: Songir Grampanchayat
- Climate: Hot (Köppen)

Songir is the largest town in Dhule Taluka, situated on the intersection of National Highway 3 (Mumbai-Agra) and state highway 17 (Ahmedabad).

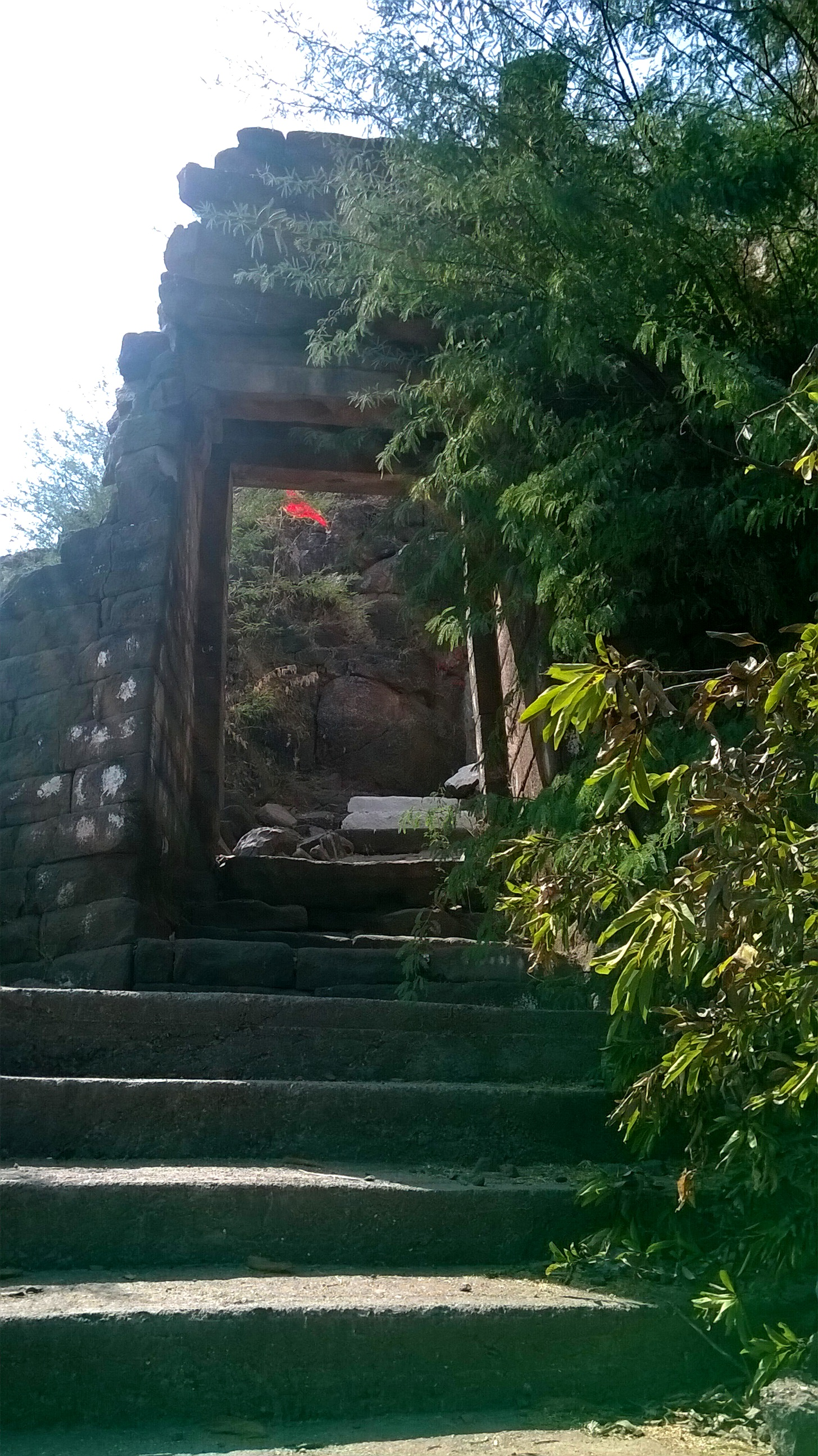
Main gate

The Songir fort atop the village is in the form of narrow strip 30m wide. An easy climb of 20 mins takes to the top of the fort. Songir has 3 to 4 small adjacent forts. There is a deep water well on the fort. Only the door frame of the entrance of the fort is remaining rest all structures are in ruined state.

== History ==
Since 1370 this fort was in control of Farooqi Sultans. Later it passed into the hands of Mughals, Marathas and finally in 1818 the British took control of the fort. The fort played a significant role in guarding the trade route from Burhanpur to Surat.

Temples in Songir include Someshwar, Gurugovind Maharaj, Jain Mandir and also Balaji Rath. Balaji Rath is in a "Rath Galli " the Rath galli is main galli of Songir. A couple of the notable temples are Someshwar and Samadhi of Guru Govind Maharaj.The village is famous for making of copper utensils.
