= Padalda =

Village in Maharashtra

Padalda Padalde Bk
- village
- Location in Maharashtra, India Padalda (India)
- Coordinates: 21°31′0″N 74°19′0″E
- Country: India
- State: Maharashtra
- District: Nandurbar

Government
  - Body: Gram Panchayat

Languages
  - Official: Marathi
- Time zone: UTC+5:30 (IST)
- PIN: 425 422
- Vehicle registration: MH-39
- Coastline: 0 kilometres (0 mi)
- Nearest city: Shahada, Maharashtra
- Literacy: 49%
- Climate: 35-40 (Köppen)
- Avg. summer temperature: 40 °C (104 °F)
- Avg. winter temperature: 10 °C (50 °F)

Padalda also known as Padalde Bk. is a small village in Shahada Taluka of Nandurbar district, Maharashtra, India. Padalda is known for the Shree Murali Manohar Temple.

== Demographics ==
As of the 2011 Indian census, Padalda has a population of 4,347 people, of whom 2,438 are in Scheduled Tribes. Padalda is a spiritually bounded village and a holy place to visit. It has 4 temples around the village. Among which the most visited temple is the Murali Manohar Temple.

== Economy ==
Most of the population in the village is dependent upon agriculture and allied fields. The crops cultivated here include Wheat, Cotton, Sugarcane, Sunflower, Jowar, Bajra, Toor dal, Chickpea, Amaranth, Banana, Water melon, Musk melon, Sesame
