= Mawchi language =

Bhil language

Mawchi
- Native to: India
- Region: Gujarat, Maharashtra
- Native speakers: 98,500 (2021)
- Language family: Indo-European: Indo-Iranian; Indo-Aryan; Western; Bhil; Mawchi
- Writing system: Devanagari, Gujarati

Language codes
- ISO 639-3: mke
- Glottolog: mawc1242

Mawchi is a Bhil language of India. It is spoken by approximately 98,500 people in places such as Gujarat and Maharashtra. It is thought to be used as a first language by all in the ethnic community.
