= Shirpur Gold Refinery =

Indian company

Shirpur Gold Refinery Limited
- Type: Public
- Traded as: BSE: 512289; NSE: AGEEGOLD
- Industry: Precious metals
- Founded: 2001
- Headquarters: Mumbai, Maharashtra, India
- Key people: Chintan A. Patel, Managing Director
- Number of employees: 3809 (2010)
- Website: http://www.shirpurgold.com/

Shirpur Gold Refinery is India's first refinery headquartered in Mumbai. It is a green field precious metal refinery with installed capacity to refine 217 MT p.a. of gold and silver respectively in Shirpur and Dhule in the state of Maharashtra. SGRL is a Public Ltd Company with its shares listed in BSE & NSE. It is promoted by the Patel brothers of the Autoriders Group.

It is a state-of-the-art refinery, occupying a 50-acre (200,000 m^{2}) complex set up at a cost of ₹2.5 billion (US$26 million). It is among the most advanced in the world and also owns its own airport with 24-hour landing facilities.

The refinery operates the subsidiary Zee Gold which was established in a joint venture with the Essel Group. The subsidiary has 70% shareholding rights of the Metalli Exploration And Mining (MEAM) in Mali.
