= Shirpur =

Shirpur Shirpur - Warwade
- Town
- Shirpur - warwade
- Location in Maharashtra, India
- Coordinates: 21°21′1″N 74°52′43″E
- Country: India
- State: Maharashtra
- District: Dhule
  - Rank: 2nd in district

Population (2022)
  - Total: 100,951
  - Rank: 2nd in district

Languages
  - Official: Marathi ahirani
- Time zone: UTC+5:30 (IST)
- PIN: 425405
- Telephone code: 91-2563
- Vehicle registration: MH 18
- Website: www.shirpur.in

Shirpur is a town and taluka in Dhule district of Nashik Division, Maharashtra, India. It is located on National Highway 3, which runs from Agra in Uttar Pradesh to Mumbai, Maharashtra. The Arunavati River and Tapi river flows through the city. Shirpur is 60 km from the city of Dhule. It houses Asia's largest and India's first gold refinery. Narsee Monjee Institute of Management Studies has a campus in Shirpur. Ahead of Shirpur there is a small private airport at Village Tande.

The major occupation of the people is agriculture with cotton and maize as the major product. The city has a gold refinery (Asia's largest), a sugar factory and a paper mill.

Shirpur has one seat in the legislative assembly of Maharashtra which is reserved for ST category.

Subhas Colony is the largest and first colony established in Shirpur in the early 1960s In the later 1990s it was divided into Adarsh Nagar. It is named after the freedom fighter of India Subhas Chandra Bose.

== Shirpur Pattern ==
Shirpur is known for its implemented irrigation project, started in October 2004, popularly known as the "Shirpur pattern". The project manager for the Shirpur pattern was Suresh Khanapurkar.

Due to the esteemed efforts of Shri Amrishbhai Patel, Shirpur has received nationwide recognition for its water conservation projects, commonly referred to as the 'Shirpur Pattern'. As a result of these projects, the groundwater level has been drastically improved - one can now find ample water at a depth of 60 feet, a major improvement from the 300 feet previously required.

Suresh Khanapurkar is working on groundwater conservation along the banks of the Arunavati River in Shirpur. His efforts have helped improve natural water storage and fertility in drought-affected areas like Shirpur. Khanapurkar aims to remove obstacles to water absorption, referring to his approach as “angioplasty in water conservation.” Today, he is recognized as the “Bhagirath” of Shirpur for his contributions.

== Education ==
A. R. Patel CBSE School, M. R. Patel CBSE School, K. V. T. R. CBSE School S. R. B. International School

=== Colleges ===
- Mukesh Patel School of Technology Management & Engineering
- School of Pharmacy & Technology Management
- Academy of Aviation

== Transportation ==
The nearest prominent railway stations on the main route are Bhusaval and Chalisgaon, Pachora. Nardana (Taluka Sindkheda) and Amalner are the nearest stations. Bus service is available to Bhusaval, Gujarat and MP state. Indore is 200 km from the city and Nasik is also 200 km from the city. Mumbai is approximately 420 km from Shirpur.

Gujarat Depot and Shirpur Depot buses are available from Shirpur to Vadodara, Ahmedabad, Surat, day and night.

Also Shirpur is well connected to Indore, Khandwa, Khargone, Burhanpur, Bhopal, Ujjain, Ratlam, Sendhwa in Madhya Pradesh State. There are many MSRTC and MPRTC buses run everyday.

Ahead of Shirpur there is a small private airport at Village

== Notable religious place ==
- Khanderao (malhar) temple or Pataleshwar Mandir: This historical temple located near the Arunavati river is founded by Rani Ahilyabai holkar. It is the local god of Shirpur. The annual Shirpur fair is arranged in the vicinity of this temple in the month of february.
- Balaji Temple at Patilwada (smaller) and Balaji temple at Rajputwada (bigger): There are two balaji temples in the town, one in the lower altitude area and one in the higher altitude area of this hilly town. The Balaji temples here are built intricately with construction like Tirumala Tirupati. It is one of the most important tourist destination in the town.
- Other temples in the region are include Shri Ekmukhi datta mandir, Shri Krishna mandir, Shri Vsudev Baba Mandir, Swaminarayan temple, Shri Padmaprabhu Jinalay, and Taran Jain Mandir.
- Nageshwar is one of the famous temples of lord Shiva which is 15 km from Shirpur which is situated to the east, in Satpuda ranges, north of Lasur village and east of Aner dam.
- Thalner, the first capital of the Faruqi kings, stands on the banks of the Tapi river, in Shirpur tehsil about 15 km south-east of taluka centre, and 47 km. (28 miles) north-east of Dhule in Maharashtra state, India. It was fortified and played a significant role in the history of Khandesh. At the foot of the fort is an old stone temple dedicated to Thaleshwar. The name Thalner probably derived from this temple. Another ancient one, Khandoba temple, is located near the Thalner bus stand. The capital was once a significant commercial centre.
- Pavali Digambar Jain Mandir was constructed in Hemadpanti style with black stone. This temple has an inscription which dates to 1412. Two images of Parshvanatha in white marble are said to have been placed in the Pavali temple about 20 years ago. The temple is rich with exquisite sculpture and carvings. 11 images were excavated from the cellar below the audience hall in 1928.
- Chintamani Parshvanath Mandir was constructed by the Digambar sect of the Jains in 1970. It is smaller than other Jain temples in this area.

== Subdivision ==
1. Shirpur City (Urban Area Shirpur taluka)
2. Thalner (South- East Shirpur taluka)
3. Sangavi ( North - East Shirpur taluka)
4. Arthe (South - West Shirpur taluka)
5. Dahivad (Central Shirpur taluka)
6. Boradi (North - West Shirpur taluka)

== Notable people ==
Shirpur is the hometown (Dahivad-Village) of Bollywood actress Smita Patil. There are educational institutes in Shirpur christened in her name.
