= Dhule district =

Coordinates: 20°54′12″N 74°46′29″E

- District of Maharashtra
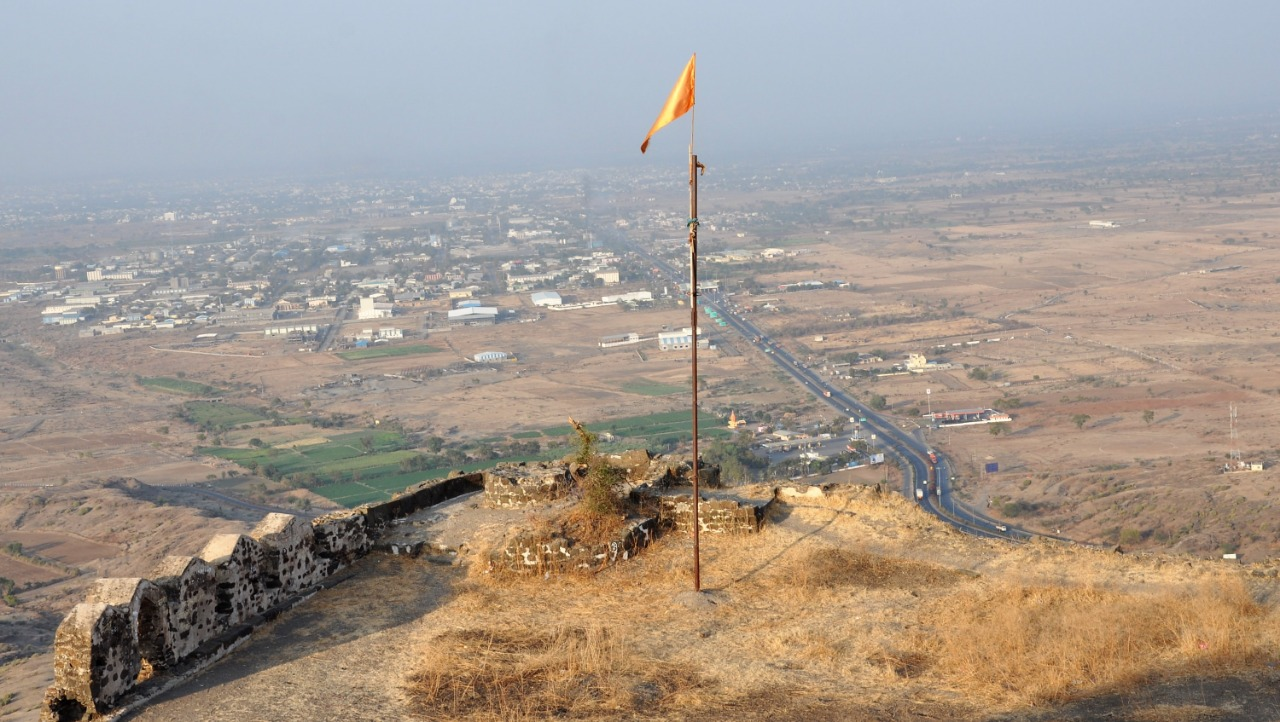
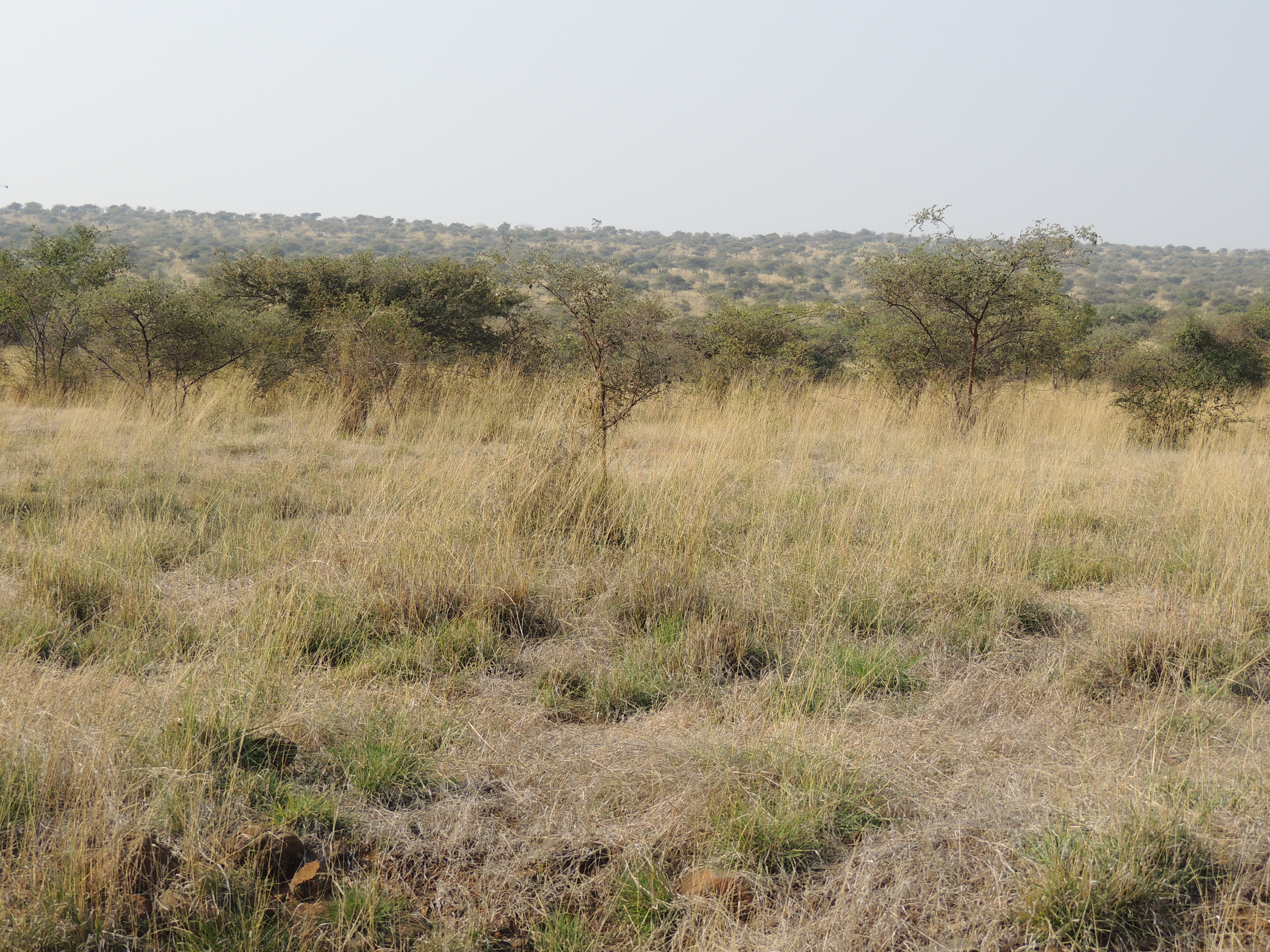
- Laling Fort, Reserved Grassland in Lamkani

- Location in Maharashtra
- Country: India
- State: Maharashtra
- Division: Nashik Division
- Headquarters: Dhule
- Tehsils: 1. Dhule, 2. Shirpur, 3. Sindkheda, 4. Sakri

Government
  - Body: Dhule Zilla Parishad
  - Cities: Dhule, Shirpur, Dondaicha, Shindkheda, Sakri, Pimpalner
  - President of Zilla Parishad: Smt. Dharti Deore
  - District Collector: Smt. Bhagyashree Vispute (IAS)
  - CEO Zilla Parishad: Shri. Babasaheb Beldar (IAS)
  - MPs: Shobha Bachhav (Dhule); Gowaal Padavi (Nandurbar)

Area
  - Total: 7,195 km^{2} (2,778 sq mi)

Population (2011)
  - Total: 2,050,862
  - Density: 285.0/km^{2} (738.2/sq mi)
  - Urban: 571,036

Demographics
  - Literacy: 72.80%
  - Sex ratio: 946
- Time zone: UTC+05:30 (IST)
- Major highways: NH-3, NH-6, NH-211 Nagaon Bari
- Average annual precipitation: 544 mm
- Website: dhule.nic.in

Dhule district (Marathi pronunciation: [d̪huɭeː]) is a district of Maharashtra, India. The of Dhule town is the administrative headquarters of the district. It is part of North Maharashtra.

The Dhule district previously comprised tracts of land predominantly inhabited by tribal populations. It was then bifurcated on 1 July 1998 into two separate districts now known as Dhule and Nandurbar, the latter comprising the tribal region. Agriculture remains the basic profession in this district. As most parts of the district do not have irrigation infrastructure, cultivation heavily depends on regular monsoons and rainwater. Apart from wheat, bajra, jowar, jwari, or onion, the most favoured commercial crop is cotton. The majority of the rural population speaks Ahirani (a dialect of Marathi), though Marathi is more widely spoken in urban areas. Around 26.11% of the district's population reside in urban areas.

The Dhule district is a part of Maharashtra's historical region of Khandesh. For administrative purposes, it is now part of the Nashik division.

== History ==
The district of Dhule was previously known as West Khandesh district. It is bordered by Berar in the east, the Nemad district in the north, and the Aurangabad and Bhir districts in the south. The region was later named Seunadesa after the king, Seunchandra of the early Yadava dynasty, who ruled over it. Subsequently, its name was changed to Khandesh to suit the title of khan given to the Farooqi kings by King Ahmad I of Guzerat.

Agastya Sage was the first to cross Vindhya and reside on the bank of Godavari. This territory was included in the empire of Ashoka. Pushyamitra, the founder of the Shunga dynasty, overthrew the Maurya dynasty. Later, Satavahan ruled over the region.

About 250 AD, the Satavahans were supplanted by the Abhiras or Ahirs in Western Maharashtra. The names of feudatories of Abhiras that ruled in Khandesh were found from copper plates discovered at Kalachala and Cave X5II at Ajanta. After the downfall of the Satavahans, the Vakatakas rose to power in Vidarbha before being overthrown by the Rastrakuta family. This region was ruled by Chalukyas of Badami and subsequently Yadavas.

In 1296 AD, Ala-ud-din Khilji invaded Ramachandra Yadava who agreed to pay a heavy ransom. His son Sankaragana stopped sending the stipulated tribute to Delhi before defecting and being slain by Malik Kafur in A.D. 1318.

In 1345, Devagiri was passed into the hands of Hasan Gangu, the founder of the Bahamani dynasty. However, Khandesh formed the southern boundaries of the Tashlug empire.

In 1370, Firoz Taghluq assigned the district of Thalner and Karavanda to Malik Raja Farooqui, the founder of the Farooqui dynasty. His family claimed the descent from Khaliph Umer Farooq, and he established himself at Thaler. From the little Khan, the region came to be known as Khandesh. During the period, a rich Ahir, Asa of Asirgad, had many storehouses in Gondwana and Khandesh which were opened in order to sell corn. However, his wife persuaded Asa to distribute the grains to the poor and suffering without payment, to which Asa agreed. He also distributed food to the aged and decrepit who were unable to perform manual labor. The ahir chief, in spite of his wealth and strength of this fort, acknowledged the supremacy of Malik Raja without struggle, and bequeathed Laling to his elder son Malik Nasir and Thalner to Malik Iftikar.

Nasir decided that he would make Asirgad his own capital upon seizing it. He wrote to Asa complaining that he was in great problems as the chiefs of Baglana, Antur, and Kherla were rising against him; of those, two had gathered large forces. Laling, too close to enemy territories was not a safe retreat, and he requested Asa to give his family a safe retreat. Asa ordered suitable apartments to be filled up for Nasir's women. Shortly after that women were brought into Asirgad and were visited by Asa's wife and daughters. The next day another of 200 groups arrived reportedly occupied by Nasir's family. Asa along with his son went to receive them, but the groups were full of armed soldiers who leaped up and murdered Asa and his sons. Nasir returned from his camp at Laling to the Asirgad fort. Shortly after this a disciple of Shaikh Zain Uddin, the tutelary saint of the family came to congratulate Nasir on his success. On his advice, Nasir built two cities on the bank of Tapi: Zainabad on the east bank and Burhanpur on the west bank. The latter became the capital of the Farooqi dynasty. In 1917 Nasir defected to his younger brother Iftikar.

1400s to 1700s Shinde's became Khandesh. Who came from Amirgarh (Present in Rajasthan) as Rao of West Khandesh in and 14th century. In past they are Rai Amirgarh and ancestors of Sindh's Royal Family. They control Khandesh from Laling fort, Songir Fort and Dhanur & Dhule Towns. In 1600s Jadhavrao lost ruling power against Mughal but after some time later Rao Shinde recaptured Khandesh with the help of Maratha Empire. In end of 1600s they came under Maratha Empire led by Chhatrapati Sambhaji and after some year later they lost the Administrative and Ruler power against Mughal Empire led by Aurangzeb in war.

On 6 January 1601 Khandesh came under the Akbar regime. Khandesh was named by Akbar a Dandes after his son Daniyal. In 1634 Khandesh was made into a suba. On 3 June 1818, the Peshwa surrendered himself before the British and Khandesh came under British rule. It was part of the Khandesh district until the district was divided in 1906.

== Demographics ==
=== Population ===
Historical population
Year	Pop.	±% p.a.
1901	257,194	—
1911	320,907	+2.24%
1921	340,792	+0.60%
1931	410,080	+1.87%
1941	485,081	+1.69%
1951	608,112	+2.29%
1961	785,278	+2.59%
1971	969,714	+2.13%
1981	1,202,284	+2.17%
1991	1,473,170	+2.05%
2001	1,707,947	+1.49%
2011	2,050,862	+1.85%

According to the 2011 census, the Dhule district has a population of 2,050,862, giving it a ranking of 223rd in India (out of a total of 640). The district has a population density of 285 inhabitants per square kilometre (740/sq mi) . Its population growth rate over the decade 2001–2011 was 19.96%.

=== Social groups ===
Bhils and Gurjars are the two main social groups in Dhule district. The Bhil is one of the largest group and they make up about 75% of the district's total population. Almost 80% land in the dule district is owned by the Gurjars and 60% Bhil tribals are landless in the district.

In Dhule district Scheduled Castes and Scheduled Tribes make up 6.22% and 31.56% of the population respectively.

=== Language ===
Languages in Dhule district (2011)
1. Khandeshi (41.8%)
2. Marathi (20.8%)
3. Bhili (10.5%)
4. Urdu (6.74%)
5. Pawri (5.88%)
6. Kukna (5.03%)
7. Hindi (3.07%)
8. Mawchi (1.96%)
9. Banjari (1.11%)
10. Others (3.22%)

At the time of the 2011 census, 33.78% of the population in the district spoke Marathi, 28.70% Khandeshi, 10.51% Bhili, 6.74% Urdu, 5.88% Pawri, 5.03% Kukna, 3.27 Hindi, 1.14% Mawchi and 1.11% Banjari as their first language. 3.22% speak other languages, in which 0.27% speak Gujari by the Gurjar community.

=== Religion ===
Religions in Dhule district (2011)
Religion	Percent
Hinduism	90.10%
Islam	8.16%
Buddhism	1.21%
Jainism	0.63%

=== Sex ratio and literacy rate ===
Dhule has a sex ratio of 946 females for every 1000 males, and a literacy rate of 72.80%. 27.84% of the population live in urban areas.

== Geography ==
=== Climate ===
Climate data for Dhule
Month	Jan	Feb	Mar	Apr	May	Jun	Jul	Aug	Sep	Oct	Nov	Dec	Year
Mean daily maximum °C (°F)	29 (84)	32 (90)	36 (97)	38 (100)	39 (102)	34 (93)	30 (86)	29 (84)	30 (86)	32 (90)	30 (86)	28 (82)	32 (90)
Mean daily minimum °C (°F)	12 (54)	14 (57)	19 (66)	22 (72)	25 (77)	24 (75)	22 (72)	21 (70)	21 (70)	19 (66)	15 (59)	12 (54)	19 (66)
Average precipitation mm (inches)	33.33 (1.31)	2.1 (0.08)	3.3 (0.13)	3.5 (0.14)	4.4 (0.17)	114.2 (4.50)	115.6 (4.55)	119.6 (4.71)	121.6 (4.79)	60.8 (2.39)	10.7 (0.42)	6.5 (0.26)	595.63 (23.45)
Source: Dhule Weather

The climate of the Dhule district is usually dry, except during the southwest monsoon season. The year can be divided into four seasons. The cold season from December to February is followed by the hot season from March to May. The south-west monsoon season that follows afterwards lasts until September, and October and November constitute the post-monsoon season. The average annual rainfall in the district is 674.0 millimetres (26.54 in). The rainfall is heavier in the hilly regions of the Western Ghats and the Satpuda ranges. Navapur near the western border has an annual rainfall of 1,097.1 mm (43.19 in). The rainfall during the south-west monsoon constitutes about 88 percent of the annual rainfall, July being the rainiest month. Some rainfall is received mostly as thundershowers in the post-monsoon season.

Aside from the south-west monsoon season, when the humidity is above 70 per cent, the air is rather dry over the district during the rest of the year. The driest part of the year is the summer season when the relative humidity is only 20 to 25 per cent in the afternoon.

From about the latter half of February, temperatures increase steadily until May. Hot, dry winds blow during April and May. With the onset of the south-west monsoon by about the second week of June, there is a drop in day temperatures. By about the beginning of October when the south-west monsoon withdraws, day temperatures begin to rise while night temperatures decrease. From November, both day and night temperatures drop rapidly until January. During the cold season, cold waves may drop the lowest temperature down to about 8–9 °C (46–48 °F).

Winds are generally light to moderate; during the summer and monsoon seasons they become stronger. During the south-west monsoon season, winds are mainly south-westerly to westerly. In the post-monsoon season winds are light and variable in directions in the mornings and north-easterly to easterly in the afternoon.

== Divisions ==
The district is divided into two sub-divisions and four talukas for administrative purposes. The Dhule and Sakri talukas are part of the Dhule sub-division while Sindkheda and Shirpur talukas are part of the Shirpur sub-division. There were five Vidhan Sabha constituencies in this district: Sakri, Shirpur, Sindkheda, Kusumba, and Dhule. Dhule was the only Lok Sabha constituency in this district. Shirpur Assembly constituency was part of the Nandurbar Lok Sabha constituency.

There are five Maharashtra State Assembly seats: Dhule Rural, Dhule City, Sindkheda, Sakri, and Shirpur.

=== subdivisions ===
1. Dhule City
2. Songir
3. Kusumba
4. Sakri
5. Pimpalner
6. Nizampur
7. Dondaicha City
8. Shindkheda
9. Nardana
10. Malpur
11. Shirpur city
12. Arthe
13. Thalner
14. Boradi

== Politics ==
After its delimitation in 2002, there is only one Lok Sabha constituency in the district, Dhule Lok Sabha constituency, comprising the six Maharashtra Assembly constituencies of Dhule Rural, Dhule City, and Sindkheda. From Nashik district, Malegaon Outer, Malegaon City, and Baglan are included in this Lok Sabha constituency.

=== Members of Parliament ===
- Shobha Bachhav (INC)
  (Dhule)
- Gowaal Padavi (INC)
  (Nandurbar)

==== List of Guardian Minister ====
Name	Term of office
Jayakumar Jitendrasinh Rawal	31 October 2014 - 8 November 2019
Abdul Sattar Abdul Nabi	9 January 2020 - 27 June 2022
Balasaheb Thorat; Additional charge	27 June 2022 - 29 June 2022
Girish Mahajan	27 September 2022 - November 2024

| Jayakumar Jitendrasinh Rawal Incumbent

==== List of District Magistrate / Collector ====
Name	Term of office
Shri. Abhinav Goel (IAS)	2023 - Incumbent

== Economy ==
In 2006 the Ministry of Panchayati Raj named Dhule one of the country's 250 most backward districts (out of a total of 640). It is one of the twelve districts in Maharashtra currently receiving funds from the Backward Regions Grant Fund Programme (BRGF).

== See also ==
- Nashik division
- List of villages in Dhule district
