= Khandesh war of succession (1508–1509) =

1508–1509 conflict in the Khandesh Sultanate

Date	August 1508 – April 1509
Location	Khandesh Sultanate (mainly Burhanpur, Asir and Thalner)
Result	Gujarat Sultanate victory: Deposition of Khanzadah Alam Khan; Accession of Adil Khan III
Territorial changes	Gujarat Sultanate re-established its suzerainty over the Khandesh Sultanate

Belligerents
Gujarat Sultanate; Nobles of Asir	Ahmadnagar Sultanate; Berar Sultanate; Nobles of Burhanpur

Commanders and leaders
Mahmud Begada; Mirza Khalil Khan; Adil Khan III; Malik Ladan Khalji; Asaf Khan; Asir-ul-Mulk; Nasrat-ul-Mulk; Mujahid-ul-Mulk	Ahmad Nizam Shah I Fathullah Imad-ul-Mulk; Malik Hisam-ud-Din; Khanzadah Alam Khan (AWOL)

Strength
Gujarati army Forces of Asir	8,000 troops of Ahmadnagar and Berar; Forces of Burhanpur

Casualties and losses
Unknown	Unknown

The Khandesh war of succession (1508–1509) was a war of succession fought over the throne of the Khandesh ruled by the Farooqui dynasty following the death of Daud Khan and the subsequent assassination of successor, Ghazni Khan. The crisis triggered a conflict between local nobility, centered around rival factions led by Wazir Malik Hisamuddin at Thalner and the noble Malik Ladan Khalji of Asirgarh. The political instability drew external intervention from neighbouring regional powers. It witnessed proxy contest between Ahmad Nizam Shah of the Ahmadnagar Sultanate and Fathullah Imad-ul-Mulk of the Berar Sultanate and Sultan Mahmud Begada of the Gujarat Sultanate. The allied Ahmadnagar and Berar backed their candidate Khanzadah Alam Khan while Gujarat backed grandson of Sultan Mahmud also named Alam Khan.

Mahmud Begada launched a rapid military expedition into the region. Facing the rapid advance of the Gujarati army, the Deccan allies withdrew, forcing the local noble factions to submit. In November 1508, Mahmud Shah marched to maintain suzerainty over Khandesh. He paused at Sambali for Ramadan, then advanced toward Thalner. News of his approaching army panicked the opposition. The Ahmadnagar and Berar forces retreated. The pretender Khanzadah Alam Khan fled and Hisamuddin abandoned Burhanpur. Shortly after, both Hisamuddin and Malik Ladan Khalji surrendered to Mahmud Begada, bringing the civil war to an immediate end. On 1 April 1509, Mahmud Begada successfully enthroned his candidate Alam Khan who assumed the title Adil Khan III, therefore re-establishing Gujarat's political influence over Khandesh.

== Background ==
Early relations between Gujarat and Khandesh were friendly. When the Bahmani commander Khalaf Hasan invaded Khandesh, Nasir Khan Farooqui (r. 1399–1437) sought protection from the Gujarat sultan. Since then, the Farooqui sultans maintained Gujarat's suzerainty and paid regular tribute. Adil Khan II (r. 1457–1501) extensively conquered territories. He refused to remain a vassal. He allied with the Ahmadnagar Sultanate and Berar Sultanate. He stopped paying tribute and threw off allegiance to Mahmud Shah of Gujarat. Mahmud Begada responded by marching against Khandesh. Adil Khan II of Khandesh, Ahmad Nizam Shah of Ahmadnagar, and Fathullah Imad-ul-Mulk of Berar united against the Gujarati advance. The Deccan allies, however, failed to halt Mahmud Begada. Mahmud marched swiftly on Khandesh before Adil Khan II could summon his Deccan allies who withdrew to their territories. Faced with the rapid Gujarati advance, Adil Khan II submitted and paid tribute. Thus, Mahmud reasserted control over Khandesh in 1500 AD.

Adil Khan II died on 28 September 1501 leaving behind no male heir. His younger brother Daud Khan, succeeded on the throne of Khandesh. He died in August 1508. Wazir Malik Hisamuddin placed Ghazni Khan, son of Daud Khan on the throne. He was poisoned by the Wazir after few days of coronation. After the death of Ghazni Khan, Malik Hisamuddin sent a delegation to the court of Ahmad Nizam Shah insisting Alam Khan to be placed on the throne of Khandesh. According to Firishta, Khanzadah Alam Khan was possibly the son of a daughter of Nizam Shah. Although the claim is doubtful and suspicious. Nizamuddin Ahmad clearly states that Khanzadah Alam Khan was the son of an officer of Burhanpur. Despite being illegitimate to the throne, Ahmad Nizam Shah and Fathullah Imad-ul-Mulk agreed to send Alam Khan from Ahmadnagar. Hisamuddin then placed him on the throne with the support of his own followers. One of the leading noble, Malik Ladan Khalji opposed the coronation. He controlled half of the Sultanate, including the Asirgarh fort. A civil war consequently broke out in Khandesh, leading Ahmadnagar and Gujarat to intervene in the kingdom's internal affairs.

== Succession war ==
Mahmud Shah opposed the illegitimate monarch backed by Ahmad Nizam Shah on the throne of Khandesh. He therefore decided to support the rebel nobles. With no legitimate male member left in the Farooqui dynasty, Mahmud put the claim of his own grandson born of his daughter also named Alam Khan. (Note: Mahmud's daughter had married Prince Ahsan Khan of the royal family of Khandesh. Accounts of Hajji-ud-Dabir states Ahsan Khan was the son of Hasan Khan who had been expelled from Khandesh by his elder brother Nasir Khan. Hasan Khan had been living in Gujarat and his descendants married the princesses of the Muzaffar Shahi dynasty of Gujarat.) Alam Khan and his widow mother were living at Thalner. With no male heir left to claim the throne, Alam Khan sought help to his maternal grandfather seeking help in obtaining the throne of Khandesh. In November 1508 Mahmud Shah marched with a strong force and sent an advance contingent to Asir to win local support. He reached at Sambali on the Narmada to observe Ramadan and summoned Prince Khalil Khan from Baroda. The ill sultan camped at Thalner and ordered Asaf Khan and Asir-ul-Mulk to march against Hisamuddin to expel him from Khandesh. There he learned that Khanzadah Alam Khan had assumed power in Thalner and Malik Ladan Khalji's opposition to recognise him. Malik Ladan Khalji shut himself up in Asirgarh where he was besieged by the forces of Alam Khan. Frightened by news of the approaching Gujarati army, Hisamuddin appealed to Ahmadnagar and Berar. Ahmad Nizam Shah and Fathullah Imad-ul-Mulk advanced toward Burhanpur. In the meantime, he received information that Mahmud Begada had already reached Thalner. They stopped advancing and sent only 8,000 troops to support their candidate. Asaf Khan's army reached Ranubar near Burhanpur. The Deccan forces fled with Khanzadah Alam Khan. Hisamuddin abandoned Burhanpur marching to Thalner by another route. There he paid homage to Mahmud Begada. Malik Ladan Khalji reached the camp and also submitted too. Both factions then accepted Mahmud Begada's candidate marking the end of the civil war. Sultan Mahmud held a court at Thalner to coronate his grandson. On 1 April 1509, Alam Khan was raised to the throne with the title Azam Humayun Adil Khan III. He made peace between Malik Ladan Khalji and Hisamuddin. Mahmud Shah appointed Hisamuddin as an aide to Adil Khan III. Two Gujarati officers Nasrat-ul-Mulk and Mujahid-ul-Mulk, were appointed with a force of two thousand cavalry. After making all arrangements Mahmud Begada arrived to Muhammadabad on 19 April 1510.

== Aftermath ==
Shortly after Hisamuddin rebelled against Adil Khan III. Hisamuddin once again attempted to collaborate with Ahmad Nizam Shah to seize the throne. The danger ended after his assassination by Daria Khan. Mahmud Shah then despatched Prince Khalil Khan consolidate the power of Adil Khan III. He further gave the daughter of Prince Khalil Khan in marriage to Adil Khan III. This matrimonial alliance successfully sealed the relations between the two states. Thereafter Adil Khan shifted his capital from Thalner to Burhanpur. In 1510, Sher Khan and Saif Khan allied with Ahmad Nizam Shah to revolt at Asir and bring the pretender Alam Khan from Ahmadnagar. Adil Khan sought help from Mahmud Begada, who dispatched troops under Dilawar Khan, Qadr Khan, and Safdar Khan. Upon the Gujarati army's arrival at Nandurbar, the rebels fled to Kowil.

== See also ==
- Mahmud Begada's campaign of Khandesh and Daulatabad
- Malwa–Bahmani Wars
- List of wars of succession

== Bibliography ==
- Chaube, J. (1975). History of Gujarat Kingdom, 1458-1537. Munshiram Manoharlal Publishers. ISBN 978-0-88386-573-6.
- Commissariat, M. S. (1938). A History of Gujarat. Vol. I. Ahmadabad: Longmans Green & Co. Ltd.
- Habib, Mohammad; Nizami, Khaliq Ahmad (1970). A Comprehensive History of India. Vol. 5, Part 2. People's Publishing House.
- Haig, Wolseley (1923). The History of the Nizam Shahi Kings of Ahmadnagar. Mazgaon: Tha British India Press.
- Haig, W. (1928). The Cambridge History of India: Turks and Afghans, edited by W. Haig. Vol. III. Cambridge University Press.
- Kunte, B. G. (1974-10-25). Arunchandra, S. Pathak (ed.). "Maharashtra State Gazetteers Dhulia District". The Gazetteers Department. Mumbai. Archived from the original on 2025-03-20.
