= Mahmud Begada's campaign of Khandesh and Daulatabad =

1498–1500 conflict in Khandesh and Daulatabad

Date	1498–1500
Location	Khandesh and Daulatabad
Result	Gujarat Sultanate victory in Khandesh; Ahmadnagar Sultanate victory in Daulatabad
Territorial changes	Gujarat Sultanate re-established its suzerainty over Khandesh; Ahmadnagar Sultanate annexed Daulatabad

Belligerents
Gujarat Sultanate; Bahmanis of Daulatabad	Ahmadnagar Sultanate; Berar Sultanate; Khandesh Sultanate

Commanders and leaders
Mahmud Begada Malik Ashraf	Adil Khan II; Ahmad Nizam Shah; Fathullah Imad-ul-Mulk; Nasir-ul-Mulk

Strength
Unknown	1498: 15,000; 1500: 3,000 cavalry

Casualties and losses
Unknown	Unknown

Mahmud Begada's campaign in Khandesh and Daulatabad (1498–1500) was a military conflict between the Gujarat Sultanate, led by Mahmud Begada, and the Deccan sultanates of Ahmadnagar and Berar, ruled respectively by Ahmad Nizam Shah and Fathullah Imad-ul-Mulk, for control of Khandesh and Daulatabad. The conflict was ensued when Adil Khan II of Khandesh shifted the allegiance of Gujarat Sultanate and formed alliance with Ahmadnagar and Berar. Moreover Malik Ashraf, former Bahmani governor of Daulatabad, sought Mahmud Begada's protection against Ahmad Nizam Shah, who had laid siege to the fort. Adil Khan II of Khandesh sought help of the Deccan sultans against Mahmud Begada. In 1498, Mahmud Begada marched to Deccan to bring Khandesh and Daulatabad under his authority. Adil Khan, joined by Ahmadnagar and Berar, opposed the Gujarati army. Mahmud initially faced setbacks. He later recovered and swiftly marched into Khandesh compelling Adil Khan to accept his suzerainty. He then marched to Daulatabad and secured Malik Ashraf's allegiance. In 1500, however, Ahmad Nizam Shah occupied Daulatabad without resistance, annexing the fort to Ahmadnagar while Khandesh remained under Gujarat.

== Background ==
When the Bahmani commander Khalaf Hasan invaded Khandesh, Nasir Khan Farooqui (r. 1399–1437) sought protection from the Gujarat sultan. Since then, the Farooqui sultans maintained Gujarat's suzerainty and paid regular tribute. Adil Khan II (r. 1457–1501) extensively conquered territories including to Gondwana and Garha-Mandla. He defeated the Koli and Bhil raiders. His expeditions carried as far as Chota Nagpur in Jharkhand. Proud of his conquests he refused to remain a vassal. He allied with the Ahmadnagar Sultanate and Berar Sultanate. He stopped paying tribute and threw off allegiance to Mahmud Begada of Gujarat.

== Gujarat's capture of Khandesh ==
In 1498, Mahmud Begada marched into Khandesh. His intended to capture Daulatabad. While advancing Mahmud Begada received request of Malik Ashraf, the governor of Daulatabad for his help against Ahmad Nizam Shah who laid siege of the fort. After Mahmud Gawan's assassination he became independent in Daulatabad. His younger brother Malik Wujiuddin served as his Deputy. Malik Wujiuddin was married to Bibi Zainab, sister of Ahmad Nizam Shah. Conflict arose when Malik Ashraf killed his brother and consolidated his power. Bibi Zainab fled to Ahmadnagar and sought her brother to avenge his husband's murder. Ahmad Nizam Shah besieged Daulatabad. Malik Ashraf requested Mahmud Shah to help him. He promised to hold the fort on his behalf and to recite Khutbah in his name.

Adil Khan requested Ahmad Nizam Shah and Fathullah Imad-ul-Mulk to assist him against Mahmud Begada. Both sultans wanted to check the Gujarati expansion into Deccan. Ahmad Nizam Shah lifted the siege of Daulatabad and arrived at Burhanpur with 15,000 troops. There he bribed a Gujarati mahout to release Biri Sal, a mad elephant at certain period during the night. At the same time rocketeers and musketeers were to hide nearby. In the middle of the night the elephant was loosed and rampaged through the sleeping camp, killing men and causing chaos. Ahmadnagar infantry then attacked with noise and fireworks. Believing they faced a full night assault and unable to locate the enemy, Mahmud Begada had to retreat about six miles. However, Ahmad Shah could not exploit this advantage thus concluded peace with him through his Vizier Nasir-ul-Mulk. Ahmad Shah hopeful of peace with Sultan Mahmud returned to Daulatabad to continue the siege. Mahmud Begada reorganized his scattered forces and remained nearby to monitor developments. Malik Ashraf again sought Mahmud's aid, promising to include his name in the coins and the Khutbah. Taking the opportunity Mahmud swiftly advanced on Khandesh before Adil Khan could call his allies. The Khandesh army took position inside the fortress of Thalner and Asirgarh. The Gujarati army besieged both of the forts. Adil Khan unable to resist submitted and paid tribute to Mahmud Begada, thereby securing his allegiance.

== Ahmadabad's capture of Daulatabad ==
Soon after Mahmud moved south to Daulatabad. Ahmad Nizam Shah learnt the opposed advance of the Gujarati army to the southern boundary of Khandesh. He grew suspicious of Adil Khan's allegiance. Though Adil Khan II remained loyal, circumstances prevented him from sending word. In confusion, Ahmad Nizam Shah abandoned the siege of Daulatabad and returned to his capital. Sultan Mahmud was received by Malik Ashraf at Daulatabad and read the Khutbah in his name. He also accepted for himself the status of vassal and agreed to pay regular tribute to him. Sultan Mahmud received presents and returned to Gujarat in 1500 AD. His authority was established over Khandesh and Daulatabad. The allegiance to Gujarat deeply offended the people of Daulatabad, who regarded Mahmud Begada as an outsider and Malik Ashraf as his puppet. Supporters of Malik Wajihuddin continued to resistance and secretly pledged allegiance to Ahmadnagar. Ahmad Nizam Shah took the opportunity and marched on Daulatabad with 3,000 cavalry. Malik Ashraf offered no resistance, and no battle is recorded. Malik Ashraf died either of chagrin and vexation or poison. Ahmad Nizam Shah occupied Daulatabad with ease in 1500 CE. The inhabitants of Daulatabad submitted to the sultan. Thus, Daulatabad was annexed into Ahmadnagar.

== Aftermath ==
Despite the loss of Daulatabad, Adil Khan II remained loyal to Mahmud Begada and acknowledged suzerainty until his death on 28 September 1501. His younger brother, Daud Khan, succeeded him on the throne of Khandesh till his death in August 1508 AD. Ghazni Khan, son of the late Daud Khan, ascended to the throne. He was poisoned by the vizier only few days later. A succession war in Khandesh broke out following his deposition and power vacum.

== See also ==
- Siege of Daulatabad
- Siege of Ahmednagar
- Siege of Ahmednagar (1543)
- Siege of Ahmednagar (1558–1559)
- Siege of Ahmednagar (1561–1562)

== Bibliography ==
- Chaube, J. (1975). History of Gujarat Kingdom, 1458-1537. Munshiram Manoharlal Publishers. ISBN 978-0-88386-573-6.
- Habib, Mohammad; Nizami, Khaliq Ahmad (1970). A Comprehensive History of India. Vol. 5, Part 2. People's Publishing House.
- Haig, W. (1928). The Cambridge History of India: Turks and Afghans, edited by W. Haig. Vol. III. Cambridge University Press.
- Kunte, B. G. (1974-10-25). Arunchandra, S. Pathak (ed.). "Maharashtra State Gazetteers Dhulia District". The Gazetteers Department. Mumbai. Archived from the original on 2025-03-20.
- Haig, Wolseley (1923). The History of the Nizam Shahi Kings of Ahmadnagar. Mazgaon: Tha British India Press.
