= Ahmad Khan Farooqui =

Sultan of Khandesh from 1382 to 1399

- Khan; Sipah Salar

1st Sultan of Khandesh
- Reign: 1382 – 19/28 April 1399
- Predecessor: Position established
- Successor: Nasir Shah Farooqui
- Born: Malik Raja c. 1340; Probably Delhi, Delhi Sultanate
- Died: 19/28 April 1399; Thalner, Khandesh Sultanate
- Issue: Malik Nasir; Malik Iftikhar; A daughter, married Hoshang Shah of Malwa
Names
- Malik Ahmad Khan Farooqui
- Dynasty: Farooqui
- Father: Khan-i-Jahan Farooqui
- Religion: Islam

Malik Ahmad Khan Farooqui (Persian: ملک احمد خان فاروقی, romanized: Malik Ahmad Khān Farūqī; c. 1340 – 19/28 April 1399), also known simply as Malik Raja or Malik Ahmad, was the founder and the first Sultan of the Khandesh Sultanate from 1382 until his death in April 1399.

== Early life ==
Malik Ahmad (also known as Malik Raja, Raja Ahmad, or Malik Raja Faruqi/Farooqi) was the son of Khan-i-Jahan Faruqi (also called Khan Jahan Faruqi or Khwaja-e-Jahan Faruqi), a noble and minister who served in the courts of the Khalji and Tughlaq dynasties of the Delhi Sultanate. The family claimed descent from the second Caliph Umar al-Faruq (hence the dynastic name "Farooqui" or "Faruqi"), with ancestors traced in some accounts to a ruling family of Khorasan; one prominent forebear was said to be the Sufi saint Ibrahim bin Adham. Some family members reportedly migrated to Delhi via Uch (in present-day Pakistan) after the Mongol conquests and rose as respected nobles under Sultans Ala-ud-din Khalji and Muhammad bin Tughlaq.

His rise to prominence occurred during the reign of Firoz Shah Tughlaq. According to the historian Firishta, Malik Raja was an avid hunter. During a royal hunt in the Gujarat region, he allegedly saved the Sultan from a wild animal or provided critical assistance when the royal party had become separated. Impressed by his bravery and resourcefulness, the Sultan appointed him to a military command and granted him the jagir (fief) of Thalner and Karanda on the northern frontier of the Deccan in 1370. He was elevated to the rank of Sipah-salar (governor or commander-in-chief) and commander of 3,000 horses. In the same year, he defeated the Raja of Baglana and compelled him to pay annual tribute to Delhi. Within a few years, he mustered a force of up to 12,000 cavalry and began extracting contributions from neighbouring rulers.

== Reign ==
By 1382 (784 AH), Malik Raja declared de facto independence from the Delhi Sultanate and established the Khandesh Sultanate (named "Khandesh," or "land of the Khans," after the title held by its rulers). Thalner served as his initial seat and stronghold. At the time of his accession, the region was relatively backwards, inhabited largely by Bhils and Kolis, with Asirgarh as one of the more prosperous areas. One of his early acts was to promote agricultural development.

He expanded control by subduing local Rajput and other chieftains, forcing tribute from the Gond Raja of Mandla, and briefly annexing Sultanpur and Nandurbar. These gains provoked retaliation from Zafar Khan (later Muzaffar Shah I of Gujarat), who besieged Thalner; Malik Raja was forced to return the annexed territories. He claimed prominent descent from Caliph Umar al-Faruq in dynastic propaganda and regarded himself as a disciple of the Chishti Sufi Shaikh Zayn al-Din Shirazi (d. 1369). His roughly 17-year rule as an independent sultan focused on consolidation rather than major expansion, laying the foundation for the Farooqui dynasty's survival through balanced relations with powerful neighbors such as Gujarat, Malwa, and the Bahmani Sultanate. As part of a marriage alliance, Ahmad's daughter was married off to the crown prince of Malwa, who eventually ascended the throne as Hoshang Shah, and Hoshang's sister was married to Ahmad's oldest son, Nasir Khan.

== Death ==
Malik Ahmad died in 1399 after reigning independently for about 17 years. Sources give slight variations in the exact date: 19 April 1399 in most accounts, or 28 April 1399 according to the 16th-century historian Muhammad Qasim Ferishta; the Hijri date is 22 Sha'ban 801 AH (corresponding to one of these April dates). He died in Thalner, where he was buried in a tomb that remains associated with the early Farooqui rulers. He was succeeded by his elder son, Nasir Khan as Nasir Shah Farooqui (also known as Malik Nasir or Garib Khan), who ruled 1399–1437.
