= Laling fort =

Indian Fortification

Laling killa
- Laling, Dhule
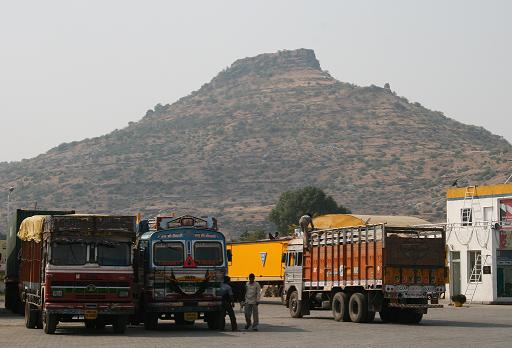
- Laling fort seen from a distance

Site information
- Owner: Govt. of India
- Open to the public: yes
- Condition: dilapidated

Location
- Shown within Maharashtra
- Coordinates: 20.812°N 74.7395°E

Site history
- Materials: Stone, Lime and Lead
- Events: Massacre of Asa Ahir by Nasir Khan

Garrison information
- Occupants: Ahirs, Faruqis, Holkars, British

Laling Killa is a small fort (killa) situated in the present day Dhule district of Maharashtra state in India. The fort is situated on top of Laling hill about 9.65 km (6.00 mi) south of Dhule city. It was one of the important forts in the Khandesh region during the time of the Faruqi Kings.

== History ==
It is a place of considerable antiquity and the fort is supposed to have been built during the reign of the first of the Faruqi Kings. The fact that this fort and not that of Thalner was granted by Malik Raja (1370-1399) to his eldest son would show that Laling was his chief fort. It was in this fort that Nasir Khan and his son Miran Adil Khan were besieged in 1437 by the Bahamani general till they were relieved by an army advancing from Gujarat. Early in the seventeenth century it is mentioned more than once in connection with the movements of the Mughal troop's Deccan campaigns [Ellior, VII, 35, 102.]. In 1862, the fort is described, as strongly situated with very few defences left. This fort was on the historical Surat-Burhanpur commercial road.

== Present condition ==
Around the fort is a small village called as Laling village with 1,549 inhabitants in 1961. Laling has, besides the fort, two Hemadpanthi temples in dilapidated condition. There is also a mined hemadpanti well. Presently the fort is in a ruined and collapsed state. It offers a panoramic view of Dhule city. There is a Lilitamata temple at the top of the Fort. There are several rock cut water cisterns on the fort. The escape gate is on the southern side of the fort which leads to a semicircular dam with a chatri nearby.

== How to reach ==
The Laling Area is part of Dhule city, and it is located 16 km Western from the Dhule CBS on a busy Mumbai-Agra NH3 Highway. The path from the old hemadpanti temple in the base village leads to the fort. Recently steps are constructed to reach Laling fort.

== Gallery ==
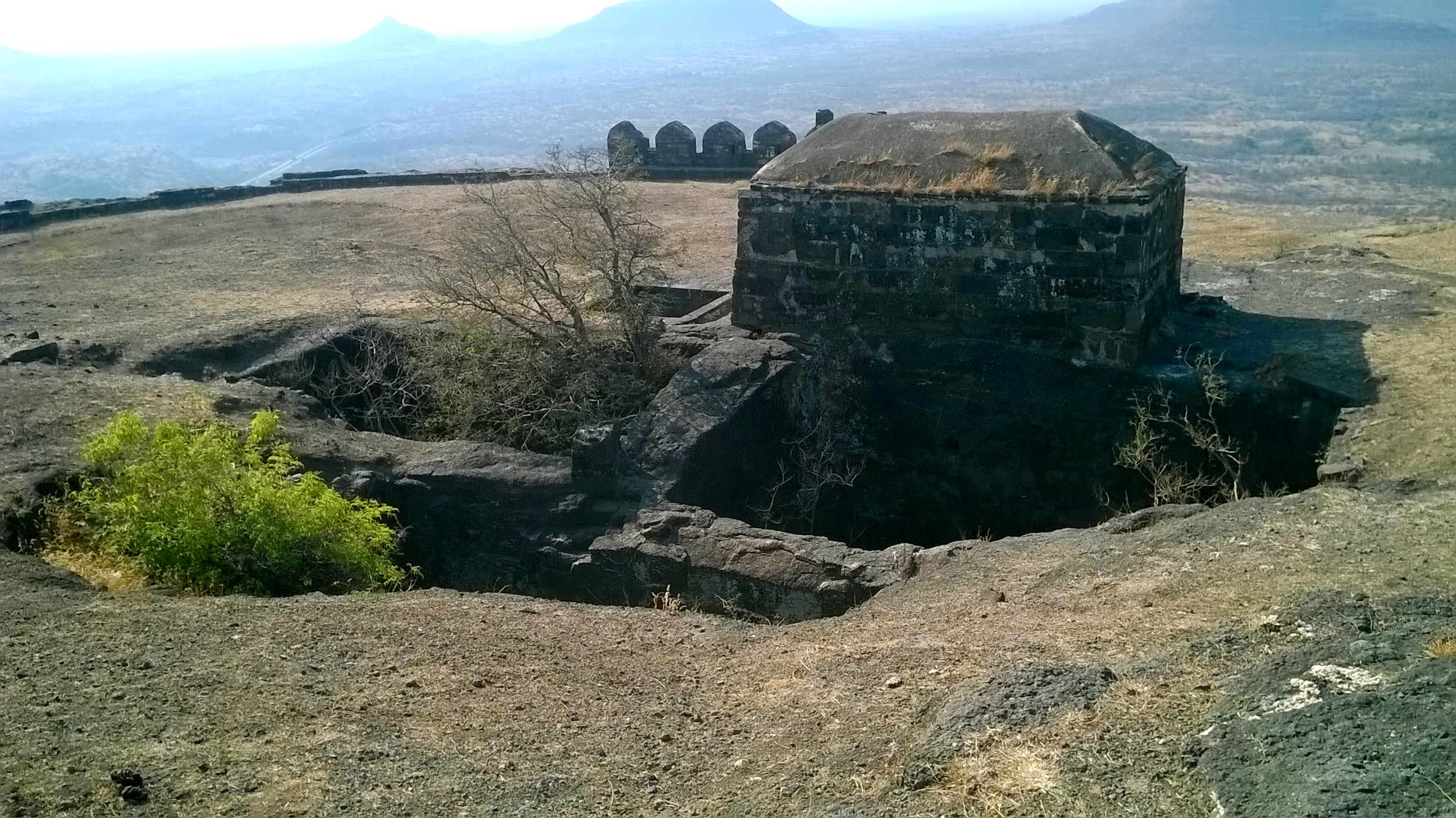
Top of the fort

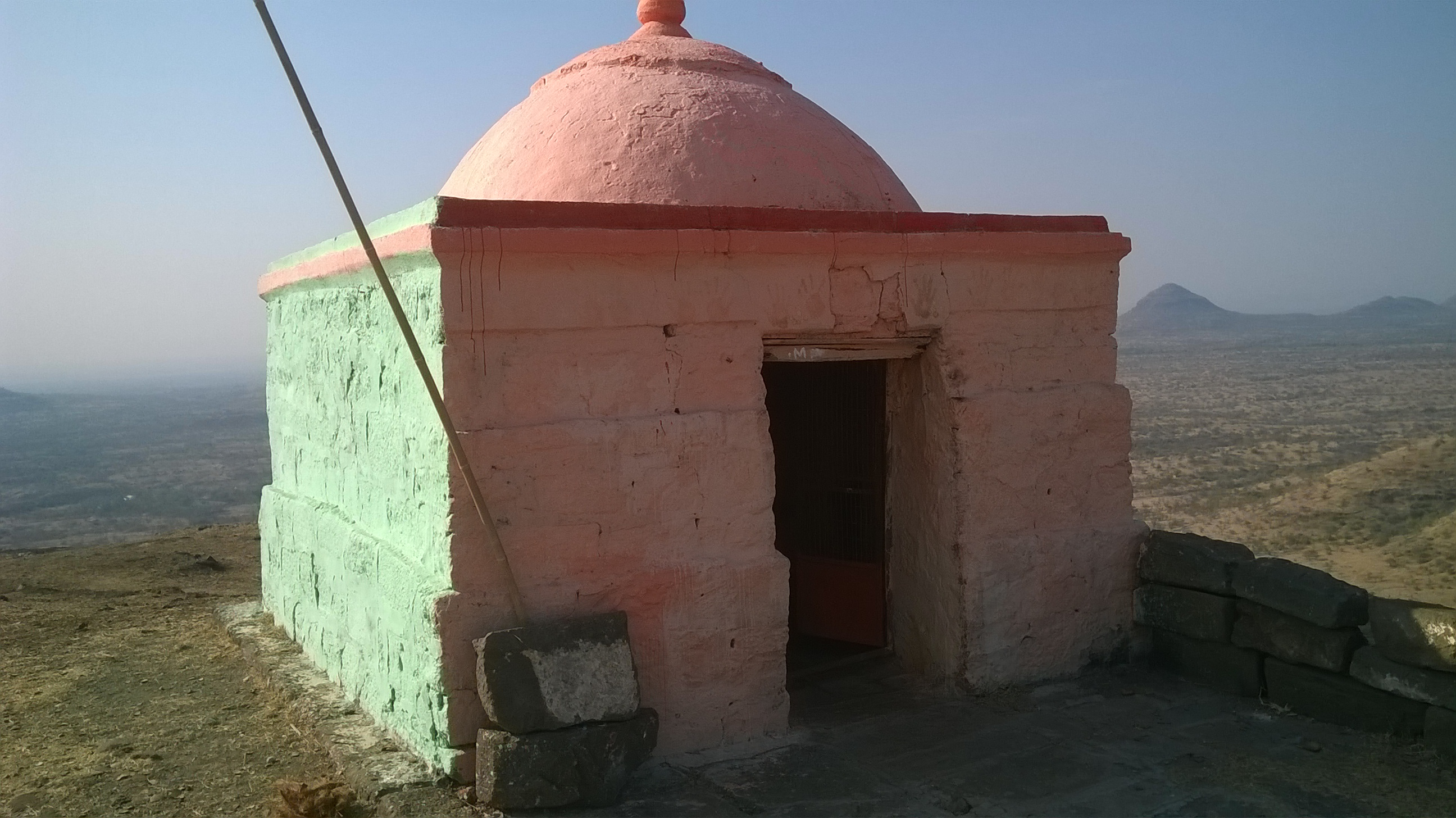
Lalita mata temple

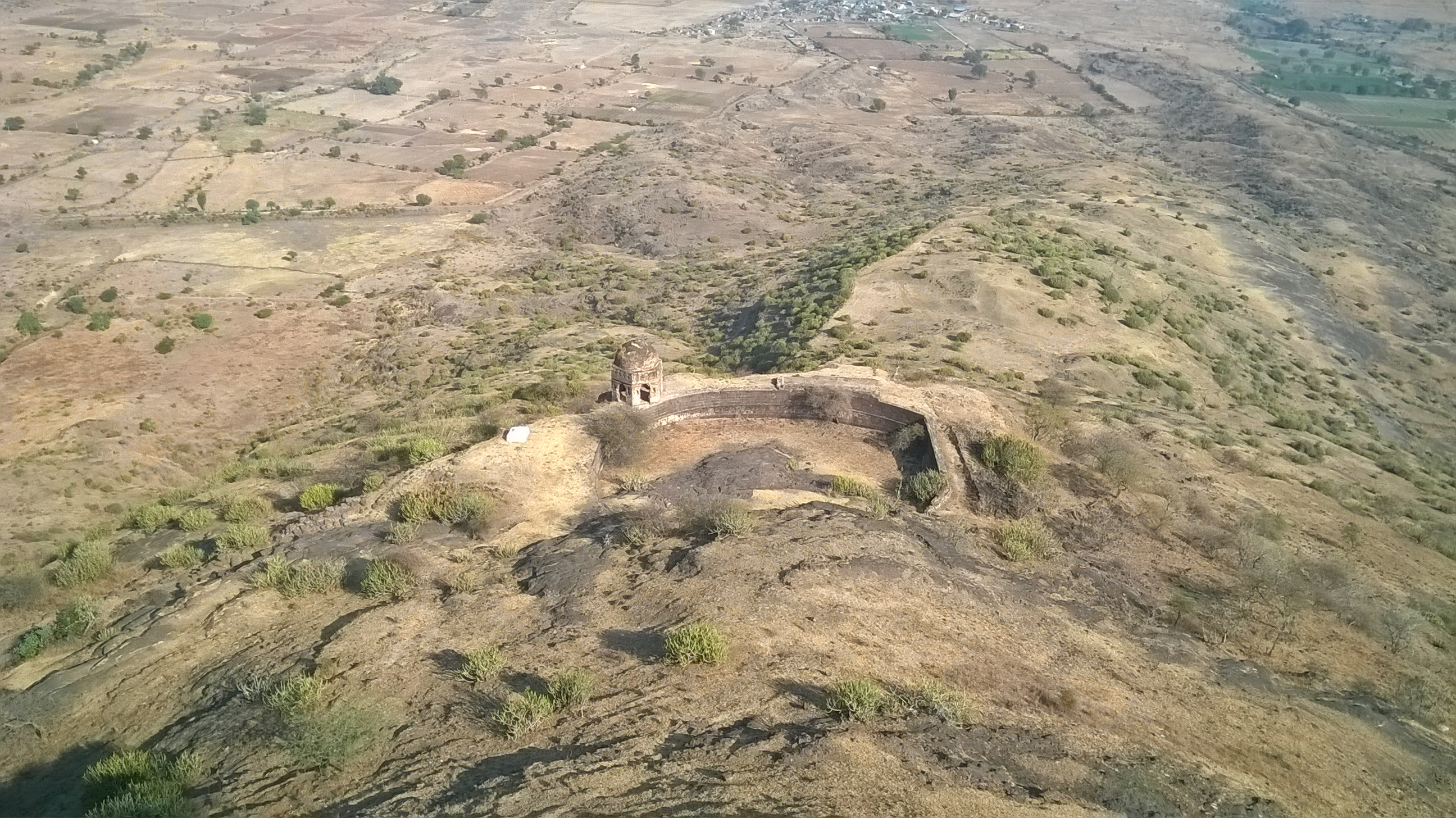
Dried pond

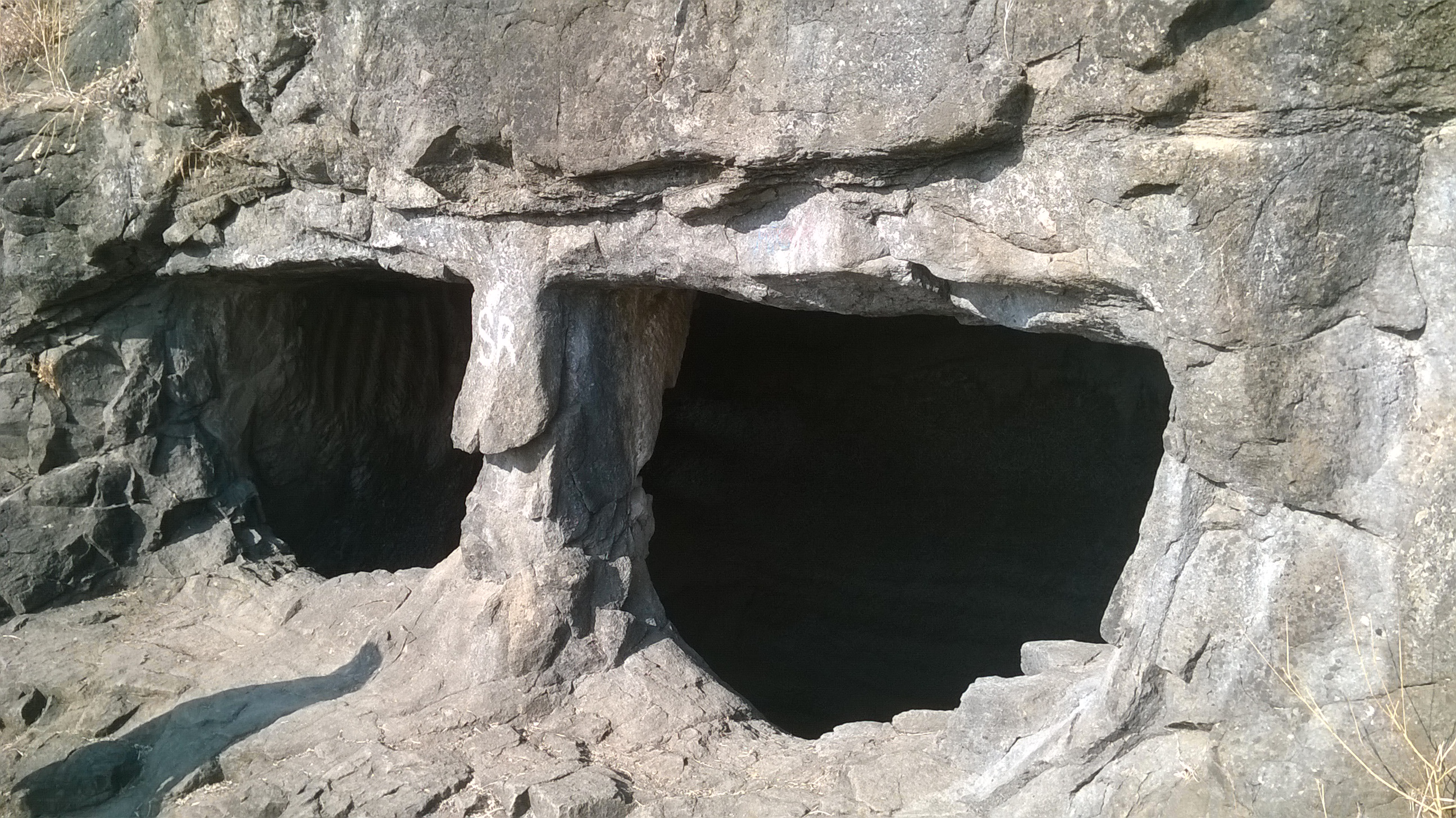
Rock cut cisterns

== See also ==
- List of forts in Maharashtra
- Khandesh
