= Kingdom of Baglana =

Ancient kingdom of India

Kingdom of Baglan बागलाण (Bāglāṇ)
- c. 1300–1638
- Status: Tributary or vassal of List: Western Chalukya Empire (970–1182); Seuna (Yadava) dynasty (12th century – 13th century); Bahmani Sultanate (1340–1343, 1366–1370); Gujarat Sultanate (14th century – 1499, 1539–1555); Malwa Sultanate (1453–Late 15th century); Ahmadnagar Sultanate (1499, 1555–1587); Mughal Empire (1573–1638)
- Capital: Jaitrapuri (Jaitapura); Mulher; Salher
- Common languages: Sanskrit, Baglanique, (Note: Half Marathi–half Gujarati) Marathi, Gujarati
- Religion: Hinduism (Shaivism, Vaishnavism)
- Government: Hereditary monarchy
- Raja, Baharji, Shah
  - early 14th century: Nanadeva (founder of the Baglan branch)
  - mid-16th century: Bhairava Sena
  - late 16th century: Narayana Shah
  - late 16th – early 17th century: Pratapa Shah
  - mid-17th century: Bhairava Shah
- History
  - Founded by Nanadeva at Jaitrapuri: c. 1300
  - Tributary of Malik Raja of Delhi Sultanate: 1370
  - Tributary of the Gujarat Sultanate: late 14th century
  - Siege of Tambola: 1429
  - Tributary of Ahmad Nizam Shah of Ahmadnagar Sultanate: 1499
  - Baharji submits to Akbar: 1573
  - Pratapa Shah reduced to Mughal feudatory: 1599–1606
  - Annexed by Aurangzeb after the siege of Mulher: 1638
Preceded by
Seuna (Yadava) dynasty
Succeeded by
Mughal Empire
Nizam of Hyderabad
Maratha Empire
British Raj
- Today part of: India

Kingdom of Baglan historically known as Bagula was a medieval Rashtrakuta principality that was situated on the main trade route between Surat and Daulatabad and Golkonda, with Burhanpur nearby.

The chiefs of Baglan claimed to be of the stock of the Rathore of Kannauj and to have been established in Baglan since 300 A. D. They are said to have at first been independent, coining their own money, and afterwards lost their power, and paid tribute to Gujarat or to the overlord of the north Deccan. Their rulers are known by the title of Baharji.

Over a period of many centuries up until 1637, the kingdom had paid a tribute to various Muslim rulers. In that year, Shah Jahan, the Mughal Emperor, placed his young son Aurangzeb in command of a force that successfully and easily annexed the lands. The territory was put under the administrative control of a Mughal faujdar as a part of Khandesh province. The erstwhile Raja of Baglana did not long survive the conquest and his successor converted to Islam.

== Early history ==
Baglan had been ruled in early times by local chiefs who had one of their headquarters at Salher. In 415 A.D. the north Deccan seems to have been under the Abhira tribe, whose capital is believed to be Anjaneri. The Abhiras, according to the Puranas, remained independent only for sixty-seven years. The Rashtrakutas then seem to have exercised suzerainty over Baglan. After the overthrow of the Rashtrakutas by Tailapa Chalukya about 970 A D, the suzerainty of Nasik and the North Deccan seems to have been divided between the Chalukyas of Gujarat on the North and the Chalukyas and Kalachuris of Kalyan till 1182 A D. The Yadavas of Chandor and Devagiri then exercised lordship over Baglan. It is mentioned in the Rashtraudhakavya that Yasasvin, Sohada and Harihara, brothers of Jakharaja of Kannauj, accepted service under king Jayasimhadeva of Anahillapura. Harihara got the kingdom of Idar, while the other two returned to Kannauj, whence they again set out for conquest. Sohada came in the land of Ahirs and Bhils in the Nasik district and at Pippalgram, he killed Ahiras and five hundred Bhils in battle and established himself at Pippalgaon. Yasasvin, on the other hand, married the daughter of Ramachandra of Devagiri and got from him the village of Talakunkana. His son Gajamalladeva seems to have extended his possessions by taking some country under the sway of Alauddin Khalji. His son Malugi seems to have made still further extensions, as it is mentioned that he conquered in battle the Yadava king Ramachandra, whom he released at the request of his famous minister Hemadri by making him his feudatory. At the end of the thirteenth century Baglan is mentioned as a district dependent on Gujarat, bordering on the dominions of Ramachandra of Devagiri.

== Medieval history ==
In 1340, Baglan came under the suzerainty of Bahmani Kingdom. However proper subjugation had not yet occurred. By 1347, they lost all authority over Baglan. In 1366, while Muhammad Shah I was campaigning against the Vijayanagara Kingdom, Bahram Khan Mazandarani, the governor of Daulatabad, rose in rebellion against the Bahmani Kingdom. He secured the support of other chieftains of Berar and the Kingdom of Baglana. Bahram Khan extracted tributes from the Maratha region. Muhammad Shah I then marched in person, defeated the Raja of Baglana and subsequently suppressed Bahram Khan's rebellion.

In 1370, when Malik Raja, the founder of the Farooqui dynasty, established himself in Khandesh. He marched against Raja Baharji and forced him to pay a yearly tribute to Delhi.

At the close of the fourteenth century, Baglana become tributary to Gujarat Sultanate. In 1429, Ahmad Shah Bahmani I, who was then at war with Gujarat, laid the country waste, and unsuccessfully attempted to take the fort of Tambola.

While Qutb-ud-Din Ahmad Shah II of Gujarat was campaigning in Kumbhalgarh, Mubarak of Khandesh attacked Baglana. Its ruler, Rai Manu sought his help to Mahmud Khalji of Malwa. In 1453, Mahmud sent a large army under Iqbal Khan and Yusuf Khan to Baglana. Mubarak was defeated and fled back to Asir. In 1454, Mubarak again attacked Baglana. Mahmud Khalji once more came to the Raja's rescue and dispatched his son, Ghiyas-ud-Din, to Baglana. The Kingdom of Baglana paid regular tribute to Mahmud Khalji due to which Mahmud Khalji was bound to protect them from external aggressions and local rebellions. In 1499, Ahmad Nizam Shah founder of the Ahmadnagar Sultanate, invaded Baglana, forcing the Raja of Baglana to pay tribute to him. Thus, Baglana became tributary state of the Ahmadnagar.

Ghiyath Shah of Malwa was married to Rani Khurshid, the daughter of the Raja of Baglana. During his reign, a violent succession struggle broke out between his two sons — Nasir-ud-Din Abd al-Qadir and Ala-ud-Din Shuja'at Khan. The latter was the son of Rani Khurshid therefore she supported Shuja'at Khan to gain the throne. However, the amirs inside the fort quickly assembled and pledged their allegiance to Nasir Shah. Rani Khurshid sent troops and Shuja'at Khan launched a weak assault, which was easily crushed by Nasir Shah's commander Malik Mallu. Following their defeat, the forces retreated to Mandu. This victory greatly enhanced Nasir Shah's prestige. He subsequently moved to Sundarsi on 15 May 1500 A.D. Later, Shuja'at Khan and Rani Khurshid were imprisoned, and Shuja'at Khan was later put to death on the orders of Nasir-ud-Din Shah.

After the conquest of Ahmadnagar by Bahadur Shah in 1539, Baglana again came under Gujarat's control. Its ruler had served under the Gujarati Sultans as in 1548 AD. In 1555, Dannaya Rai, the governor of Antur Fort, rebelled against Hussain Nizam Shah I. His example was followed by Raja Bahirji, the governor of the forts of Galna and Baglana. In 1555, Hussain Nizam Shah I marched against them and within a short time captured the forts of Galna, Antur and Baglana, forcing their chiefs to submit. In 1587, Narayan of Baglana rebelled against his brother Baharji. Baharji sought help from Murtaza Nizam Shah I, agreeing to pay indemnity and accept his suzerainty. An army under Farhad Khan was sent to Baglana, but found Baharji already defeated. Farhad Khan sought instructions from Wakil Habibullah. Habibullah was soon replaced by Mirza Khan, who recalled the army.

=== Mughal period ===
In 1573, following the capture of Surat the Raja of Baglana and Raja Ali Khan of Khandesh came and paid homage to Emperor Akbar. The Raja of Baglana was rewarded for his service in capturing the rebel Mirza Sharaf-ud-Din Husain, who was passing through Baglana on his way to the Deccan. In 1588–89, Mughal forces were sent to assist Bahirji of Baglana, who was loyal to the Mughals, in a civil war against his brother.

Following Akbar's conquest of Khandesh in 1599, the Mughal army attempted to capture Baglan. Akbar besieged the local ruler, Pratap Shah, for seven years but failed. Akbar was ultimately obliged to reach a compromise. He granted Pratap Shah control over Nizampur, Data, Badur, and several adjacent villages in exchange for Pratap Shah agreeing to protect merchants passing through his territory, regularly send presents to the Emperor, and leave one of his sons at Burhanpur as a pledge of loyalty. Pratap Shah also stamped coins known as Mahmudis. He subsequently maintained good relations with Emperor Jahangir. Their relationship was commemorated in the Jahangir Charitra, a literary work commissioned by Pratap Shah himself.

In 1609, the armies of the Deccan Sultanates under Malik Ambar invaded the territory of the Baglana chief, Pratap Shah. They invading army captured its forts and towns. The English merchant William Hawkins, while travelling from Surat to Burhanpur with an escort of about sixty Pathan horsemen, was attacked by a band of Deccanis. The invasion of Baglana and the subsequent Mughal defence disrupted normal communication and transport in the region for a considerable time. Pratap Shah died and was succeeded by Bhairava Shah.

==== Fall of Baglana (1637–38) ====
Kingdom of Baglana, which adjoined Gujarat and Khandesh and lay in the middle of imperial territory, had been tributary to Muslim rulers for centuries. In 1637, during his first viceroyalty of the Deccan, Prince Aurangzeb was ordered to annex it. Aurangzeb deputed Muhammad Tahir titled Wazir Khan, Maloji Deccani, Zahid Khan Koka and Saiyid Abdul Wahab of Khandesh to conquer Baglana. After a siege, its capital fort of Mulher was taken. The Raja of Baglana, sent his mother to negotiate. In 1638 the fort was surrendered and the raja submitted before Aurangzeb.

Baglana was annexed to the province of Khandesh and placed under a Mughal faujdar. Baharji was inducted into Mughal service as a mansabdar. The district of Ramgir, held by his son-in-law Sum Deo, was also taken, but as its expenses exceeded its income, it was restored to Baharji for an annual tribute of Rs. 10,000. Baharji died soon after. His son Bairam Shah converted to Islam. He received the title Daulatmand Khan and a rank of 1,500 troops and granted the pargana of Paunar in Khandesh. He lived into Aurangzeb's reign and erected buildings at Paunar, traces of which still remain.

== Early modern period ==
In 1670, Shivaji's officer, Moro Trimal captured Salher. In 1672 the fort was besieged by Mahabat Khan. A relief force sent by Shivaji successfully repelled the Mughals after heavy fighting. In 1684, Prince Muhammad Azam secured the fort through promises and gifts. Following the Nizam's establishment of an independent rule in the Deccan in 1723, Baglan was placed under a local governor with a commandant stationed at Mulher. By 1751, Salher and Mulher were recognized as the primary centers of Baglana. Following the Battle of Kharda in 1795, the Nizam ceded Baglana to the Peshwa, and it was grouped with Khandesh under the administration of Sarsubhedar Balaji Sakharam. The fort of Salher was reportedly granted by the Peshwa to Rani Gahinabai, wife of Govindrao Gaekwad, for her personal dress expenses. In the Anglo–Maratha War, Baglan came under British control following the surrender of Mulher fort on 3 July 1818.

== See also ==
- Rashtrakuta Empire
- Maratha clan system

== Bibliography ==
- Krishnamacharya, Embar, ed. (1917). Rastraudha Vansh Mahakavyam. Baroda: Baroda Government.
