= Raja Ali Khan =

Sultan of Khandesh from 1576 to 1597

Miran Adil Shah IV
- Raja; Adil Shah

14th Sultan of Khandesh
- Reign: 1576 – 5 February 1597
- Predecessor: Hasan Khan
- Successor: Bahadur Khan
- Born: Ali Khan c. 1545; Burhanpur or Thalner, Khandesh Sultanate
- Died: 5 February 1597; Sonpeth, Khandesh Sultanate
- Issue: Bahadur Khan
Names
- Raja Ali Khan Farooqui Miran Adil Shah IV
- Dynasty: Farooqui
- Father: Miran Mubarak Khan II
- Religion: Sunni Islam

Raja Ali Khan, better known by his regnal title Miran Adil Shah IV, was the Sultan of Khandesh who ruled from 1576 to 1597. In 1591 he, to some extent, recognized the overlordship of the Mughal Emperor Akbar by sending one of his daughters to be a wife of Akbar's son Jahangir.

In 1595 when Akbar invaded the Sultanate of Ahmadnagar Raja Ali Khan refused to aid the invasion. Khandesh later became embroiled in war with the Mughal Empire which would lead to its annexation to the empire 4 years after Raja Ali Khan died.

== Reign ==
In 1577, Akbar sent an expeditionary force of 55,000 to Khandesh to secure its sub-ordination. Raja Ali Khan was compelled to accept it. In 1586 CE, Akbar’s governor of Malwa Khan Azam invaded Berar. Raja Ali Khan joined hands with Ahmadnager and defeated him. In 1591 CE, Akbar sent Faizi to Khandesh and Ahmadnagar courts to invite them to accept Mughal suzerainty. Raja Ali Khan agreed to accept. Later, Raja Ali Khan was assigned a rank (mansab) of 5000.

== Marriage with Akbar's daughter ==
Akbar gave his daughter to Raja Ali Khan for a political marriage, but Raja Ali Khan did not accept incorporation into the Mughal hierarchy until he was militarily forced to submit.

== Daughter's marriage with Jahangir ==
In 1593 Raja Ali Khan sent his daughter with wooing gifts to Prince Salim Mirza (future Emperor Jahangir). The marriage took place on 10 September 1594, and her family obtained a strong protection. She died on 20 October 1596.

== Death ==
On 5 February 1597 he died in the battle of Sonpet between the Mughals and Ahmadnagar, while fighting on the Mughal side. His body was brought to Burhanpur for burial.
