= Nasir Shah Farooqui =

Sultan of Khandesh from 1399 to 1437

- Khan; Sipah Salar

2nd Sultan of Khandesh
- Reign: 28 April 1399 – 18 September 1437
- Predecessor: Ahmad Khan Farooqui
- Successor: Miran Adil Khan I
- Born: Malik Nasir Khan
- Died: 18 September 1437; Laling, Khandesh Sultanate
- Burial: Thalner, Khandesh Sultanate
- Spouse: A daughter of Dilawar Khan of Malwa
- Issue: Miran Adil Khan I Agha Zainab
Names
- Nasir Shah Farooqui
Regnal name
- Nasir-ud-Dunya wa-ud-Din Abu'l Fath Nasir Shah al-Sultan
- Dynasty: Farooqui
- Father: Ahmad Khan Farooqui
- Religion: Islam

Nasir-ud-Din Nasir Shah, (Note: Persian: ناصرالدین ناصر شاه, Khandesi: नासिरुद्दीन नासिर शाह) also known as Malik Nasir Khan or Garib Khan, was the second Sultan of the Khandesh Sultanate. He succeeded his father, Ahmad Farooqui, in 1399 and ruled until his death in 1437, a reign of approximately thirty-eight years. Nasir Khan is best remembered for consolidating the sultanate through the strategic capture of Asirgarh fort, founding the city of Burhanpur (which became the dynasty's long-term capital), and navigating complex diplomatic and military relations with neighboring powers like the Gujarat, Malwa, and the Bahmani Sultanates.

Nasir Khan, as a prince, married the daughter of Dilawar Khan, the first sultan of Malwa Sultanate, whereas his sister was married to Dilawar Khan's son, Hoshang Shah. As part of a marriage alliance with the Bahmanis, his daughter Agha Zainab married crown prince Alauddin of Bahmani Sultanate, who later ascended the throne as Alau'd-din Ahmad Shah.

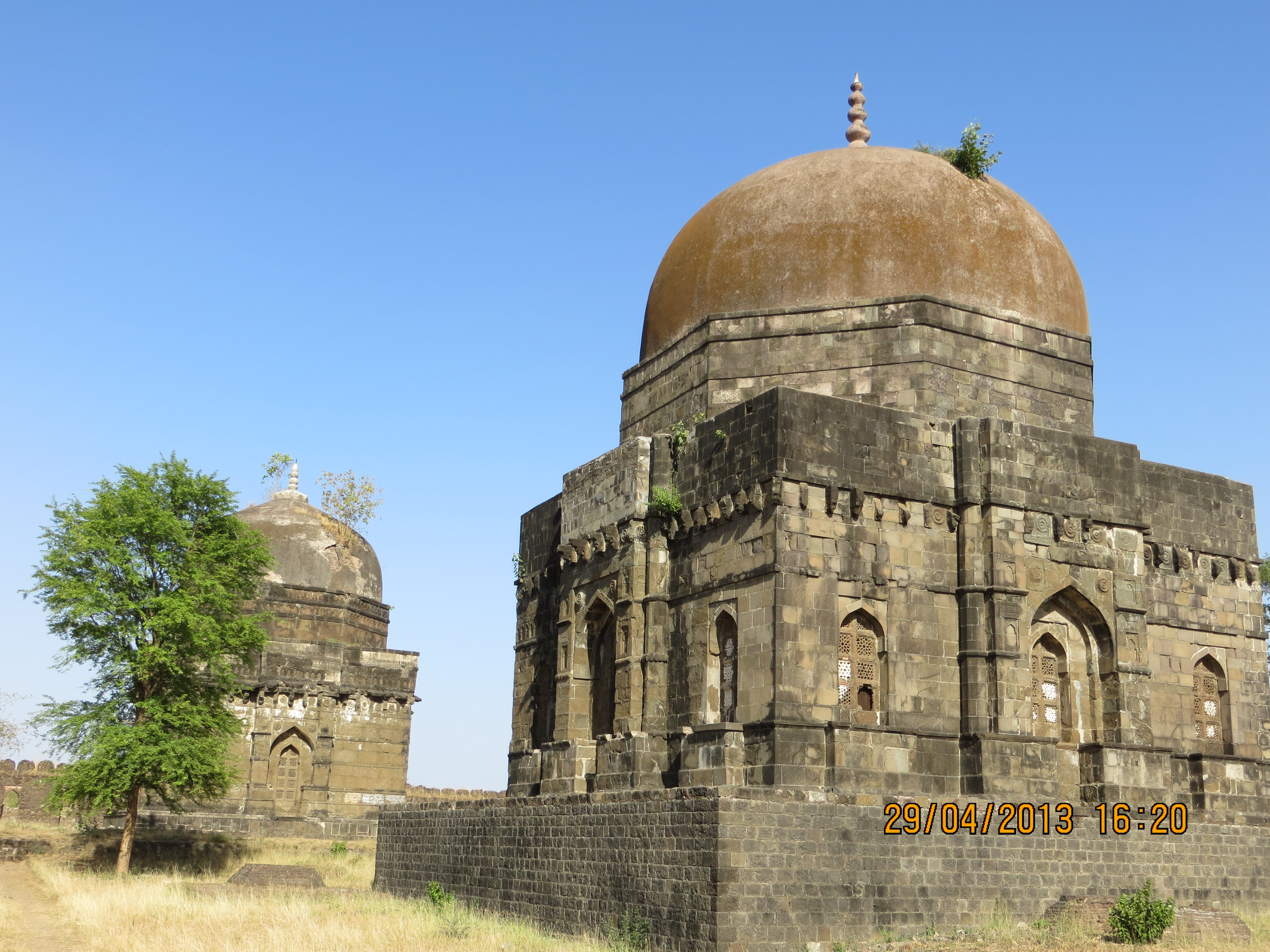
Tombs of Nadir Shah and his son Adil Shah in Burhanpur
