= Thalner =

Village in Maharashtra

Thalner (Thaleshwar)
- Dhule district, Maharashtra
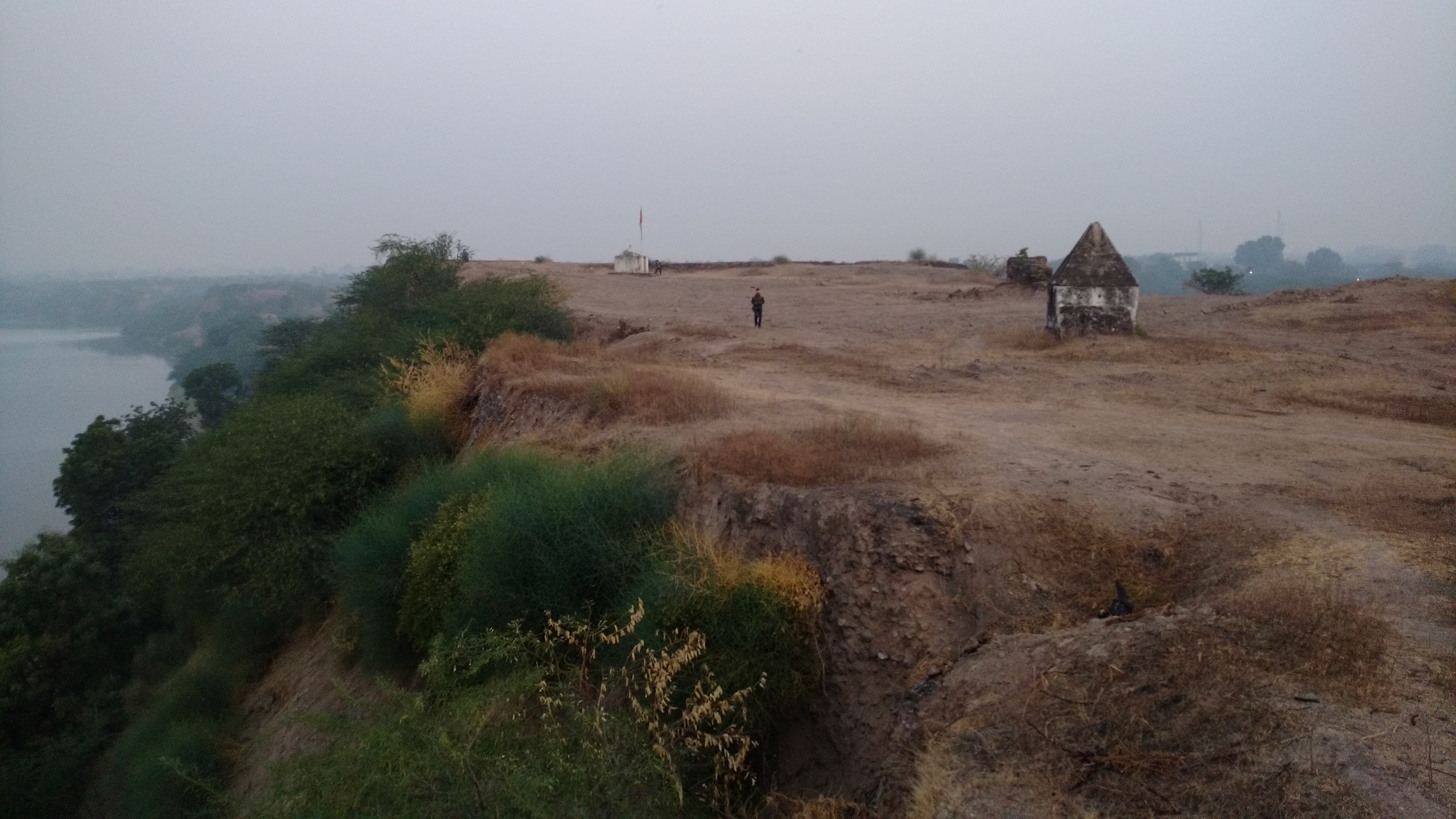
- Thalner Fort

Site information
- Owner: Government of India
- Open to the public: Yes
- Condition: dilapidated

Location
- Location within Maharashtra
- Location within Maharashtra
- Coordinates: 21.255°N 74.955°E

Site history
- Built: 1128
- Materials: Stone, lime and lead
- Events: Battle of Thalner (1818)

Garrison information
- Occupants: Ahirs, Faruqis, Holkars, British

Thalner is an Shirpur Tahsil's Village, the first capital of the Faruqi kings, stands on the banks of the Tapi river, in Shirpur tehsil about 46.67 km. (28 miles) north-east of Dhule in Maharashtra state, India. It was fortified and played a significant role in the history of Khandesh. At the foot of the fort is an old stone temple dedicated to Thaleshwar. The name Thalner probably derived from this temple. The capital was once a significant commercial centre.

== Thalner Fort ==
Thalner Fort is a historic fort located in the Dhule district of Maharashtra, India. Situated on the banks of the Tapi River, it is considered one of the oldest forts in the region and has a history spanning several centuries.

The fort is believed to have been established during the early medieval period and rose to prominence under the rule of the Yadava dynasty. It later came under the control of the Bahmani Sultanate, which further fortified the structure. In the 16th century, the fort was captured by the Mughal Empire under Akbar, and it served as a strategic military outpost in the Deccan region.

During the 18th century, Thalner Fort came under the control of the Maratha Empire, playing a role in their military campaigns against both the Mughals and the expanding British presence. The fort's strategic significance declined with the development of modern warfare, and it was eventually taken over by the British East India Company, who used it mainly for administrative purposes.

== History ==
According to a local grant, in 1128, while the country for 32.18 km (20 miles) around was ' without a light', and twenty-seven of its forts were deserted, Thalner prospered under Javaji and Govaji of the Tale sub-division of Gavali rajas or the Abhira kings. At that time, Daulatrao, son of Bajirao of Daulatabad came to the people of Khandesh, and finding Thalner flourishing established Javaji's family as headmen of the town.

In 1370, when Firozshah Tughluq (1351–1388) granted Malik Raja Faruqi an estate on the south border of Gujarat, Malik chose Thalner as his headquarters. In 1371, defeated by the Gujarat king, Malik was forced to take refuge in Thalner fort. On his death in 1399 Malik left Thalner to his second son Iftikar Khan. But in 1417 with the aid of the Sultan of Malwa, Nasir Khan, the elder son, wrested it from his brother. In 1498 Thalner was invaded by Mahmud Begada, king of Gujarat, whose army laid waste the district and would not retire till arrears of tribute were paid. In 1511 Mahmud Begada granted Thalner with about one-half of Khandesh to Malik Hissamuddin, a noble of his court. But in the next year, Hissamuddin was murdered and Thalner was restored to Khandesh. In 1566 it was the scene of the defeat of the Khandesh king Miran Muhammad Shah II by Changiz Khan of Gujarat. In 1600, when it passed to Emperor Akbar, Thalner was noticed as being of great strength though in a plain. In 1660 Tavernier mentioned it as one of the places of trade on the Surat and Burhanpur line.

In 1750 it was a strong fort, the centre of thirty-two little governments. Shortly after this, it passed to the Peshwa, and was by him made over to Holkar, who, around 1800, pledged it to the Nimbalkars. It was recovered the following year and kept by the Holkar family until in 1818, when, under the terms of the Mandesar treaty, it was handed over to the British Government.

=== Battle of Thalner, 1818 ===
Sindva was a place with a much greater name for strength in the Khandesh region, but it surrendered to the British at once, hence no resistance was expected at Thalner. However, its capture proved to be one of the bloodiest incidents in the conquest of Khandesh.

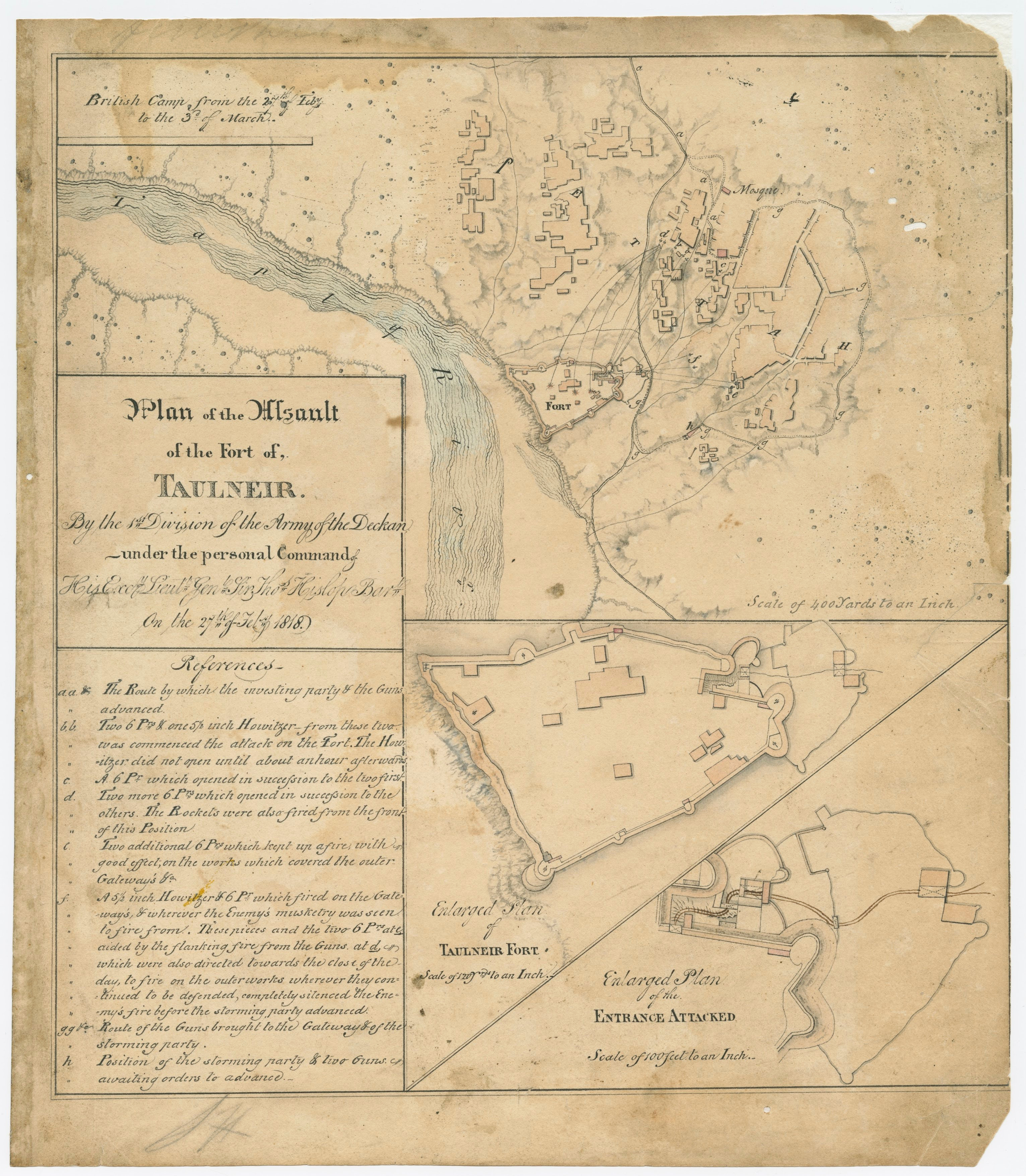
Plan of the assault of the fort of Thalner, 27 February 1818
Kalakriti Archives

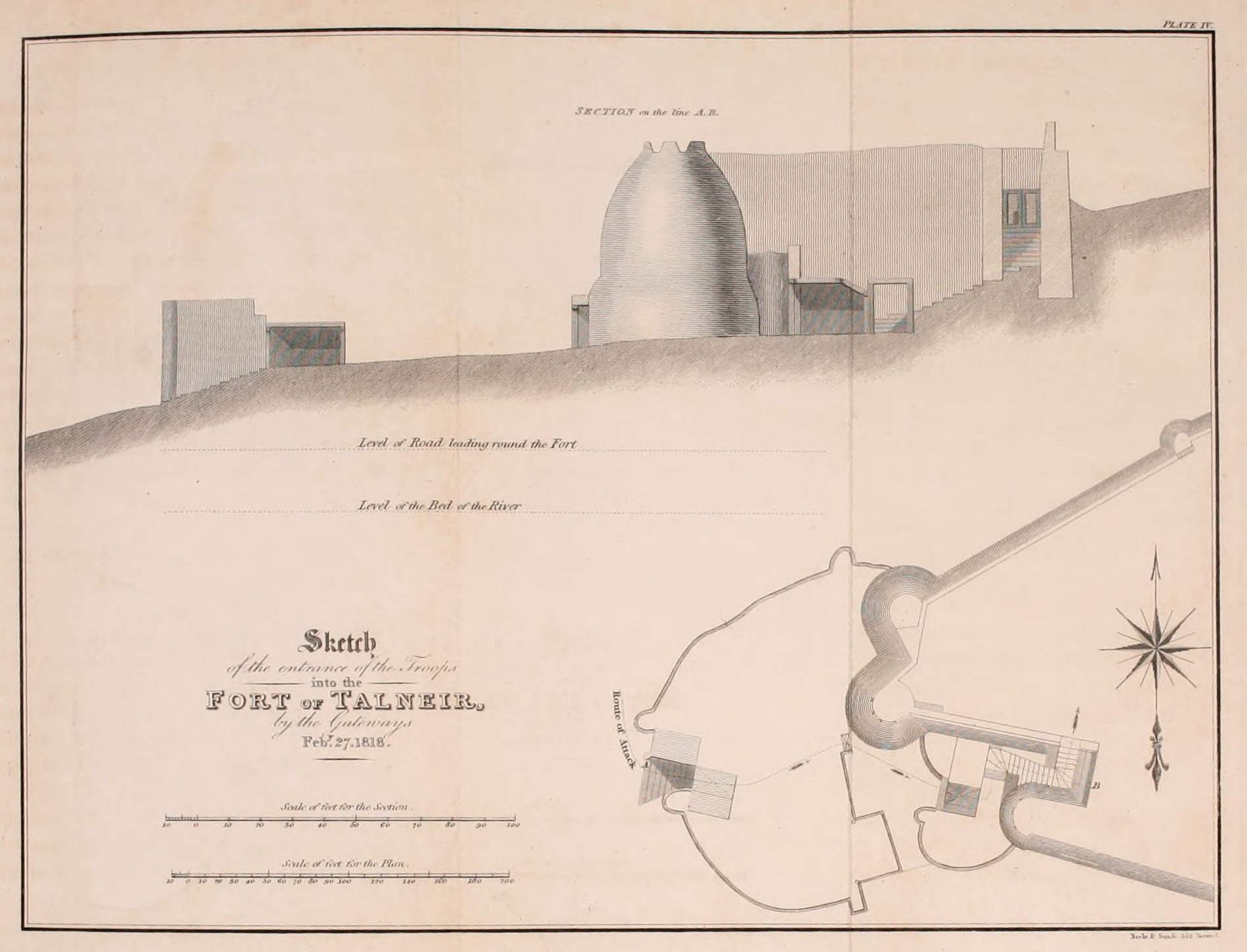
Plan and section elevation of Thalner's gates, 27 February 1818

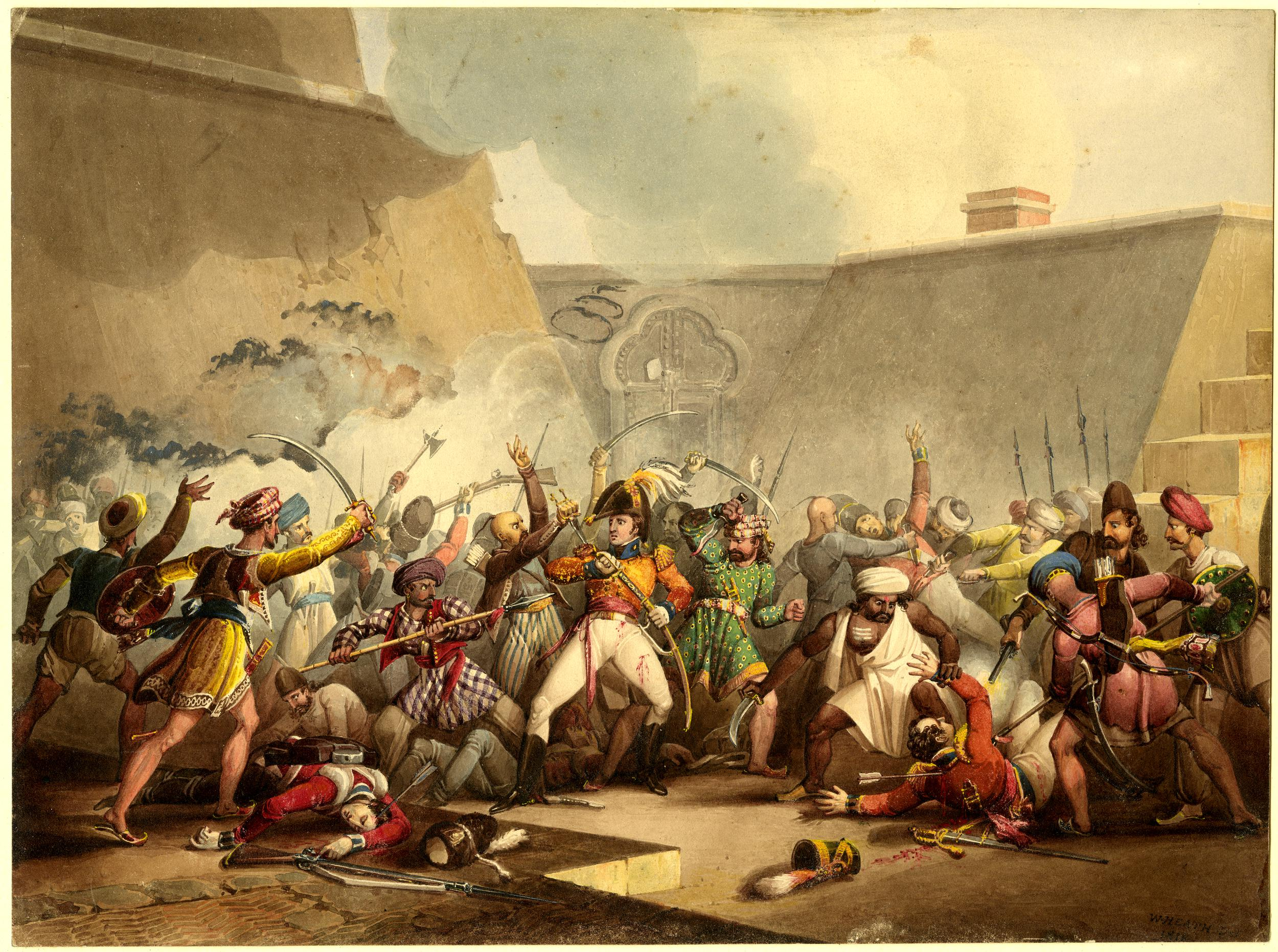
Lt Col Murray withstands his adversaries. Artist: William Heath
British Museum

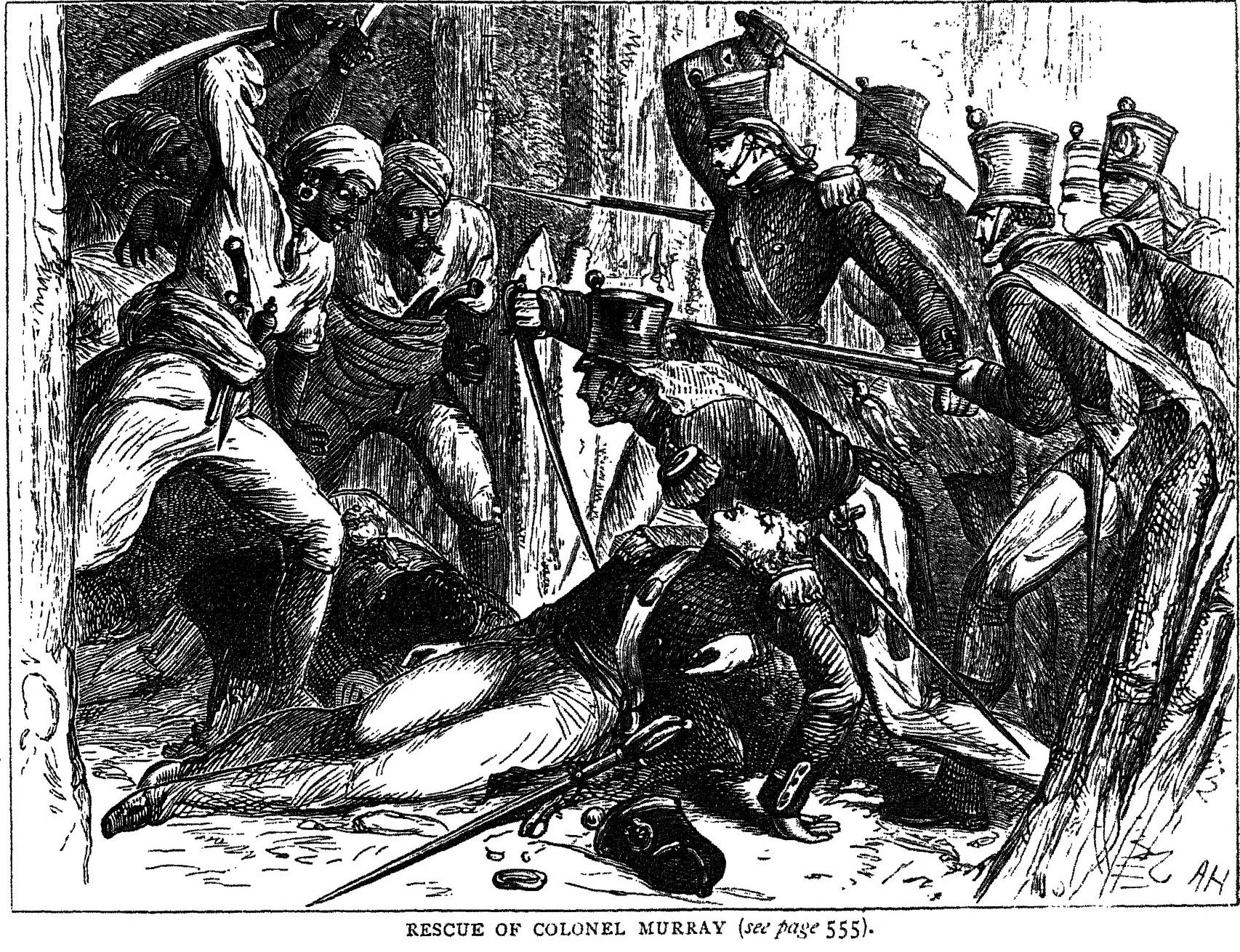
Capt M‘Craith drags Lt Col Murray clear of the wicket whilst warding off blows with his sword.

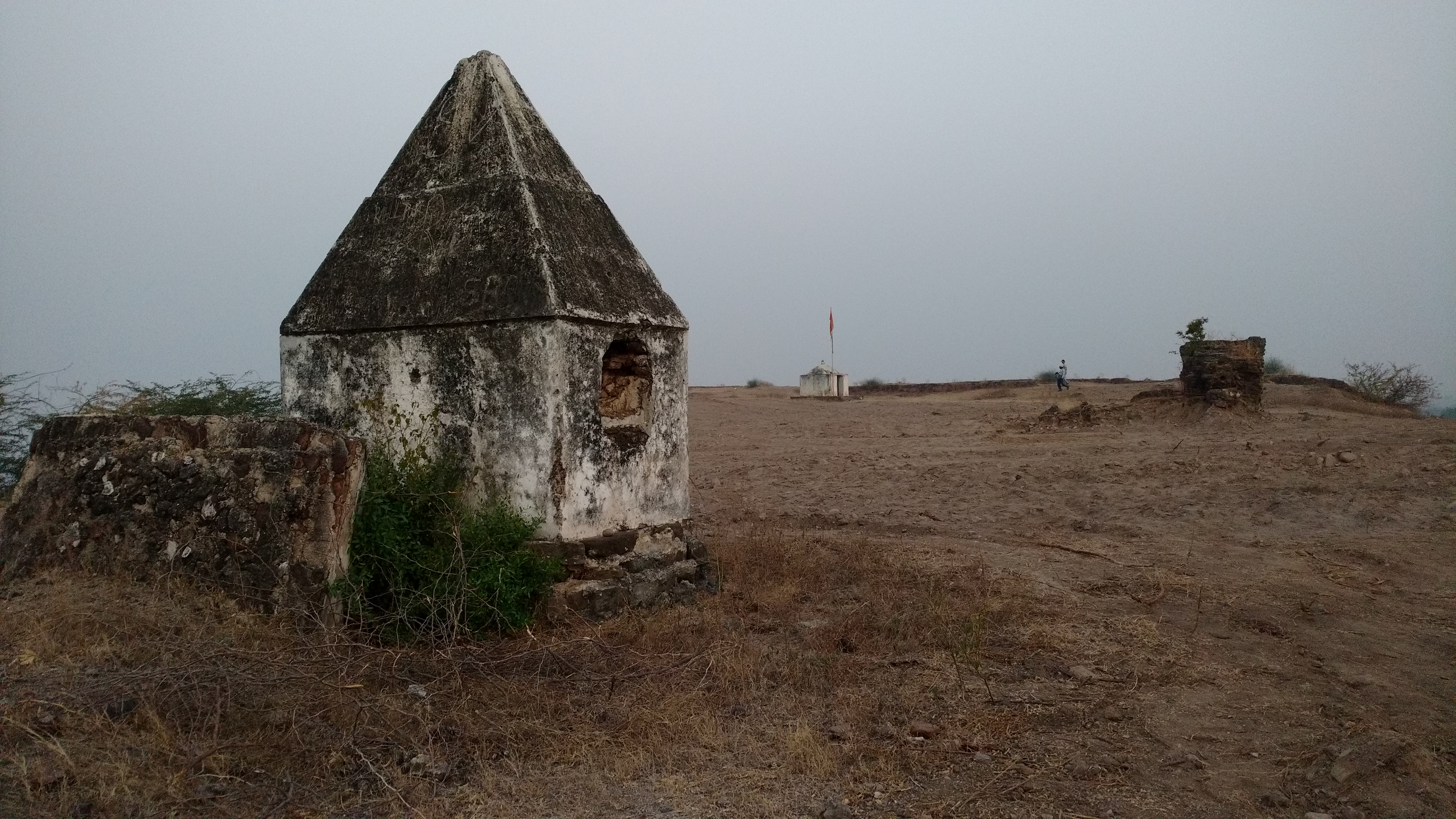
Tombs of British officers killed in the battle, 2017

== Present condition ==
The fort of Thalner is in a dilapidated condition. Besides the tombs of Major MacGregor and Captain Gordon, the chief objects of interest are ten Muhammedan domed tombs of common country black stone and two of burnt brick. Of the whole number, one is eight cornered and the rest are square. They vary in size from eleven feet by eleven to three and a half feet square. Though more or less damaged outwardly and with the inside part of their domes partly destroyed, they are in good order. The eight-cornered tomb has some Arabic writing, but so worn as to be unreadable.

== Tourist attractions ==
In Thalner there are two temples, one dedicated to Mahadeva and the other to Khandoba's Temple. The Mahadeva temple is located at Tapi riverside, and Khandoba temple is located near the Thalner bus stand.

== Notable personalities ==
Lata Mangeshkar's mother, affectionately called 'Mai', was from Thalner. She was the daughter of Seth Haridas Ramdas Lad, a prosperous businessman of the town.
