= Asirgarh Fort =

15th-century fort in India

- Burhanpur, Madhya Pradesh, India
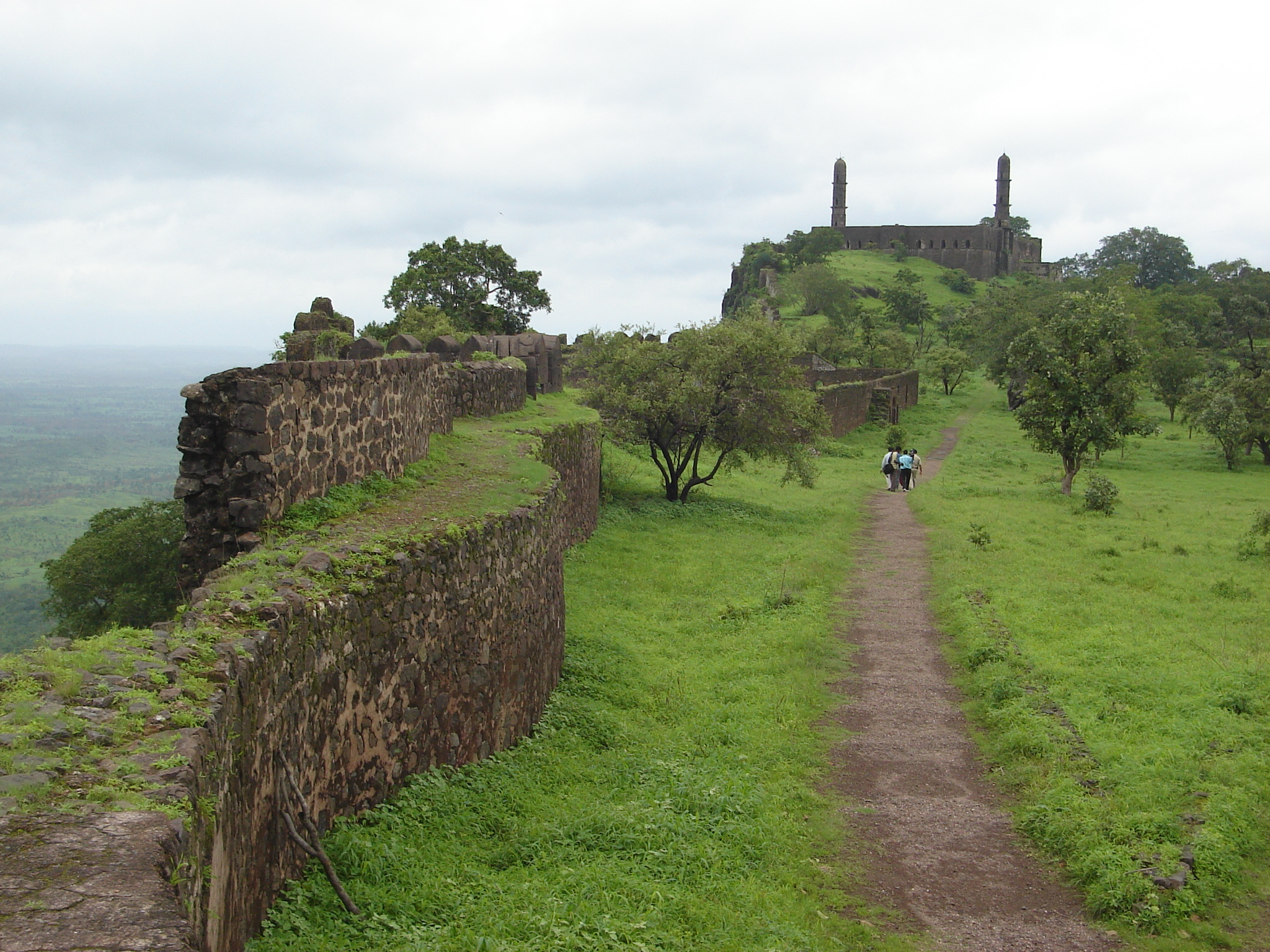
- Asirgarh Fort in 2013

Site information
- Type: Hill fort
- Owner: Government of India
- Open to the public: yes
- Condition: Dilapidated

Location
- Asirgarh fort within India
- Location within India
- Coordinates: 21.47°N 76.29°E

Site history
- Built: By Ahirs
- Materials: Stone, limestone and lead

Garrison information
- Occupants: Yadavas->Taunk-> Tomar->Chauhan dynasty->Faruqi dynasty->Mughal->Maratha->Holkars->Shinde->British

Asirgarh Fort is an Indian fortress (qila) situated in the Satpura Range about 20 kilometres (12 mi) north of the city of Burhanpur, in the Indian state of Madhya Pradesh. The fort is said to date to the early 15th century and commands a pass through the Satpuras connecting the valleys of the Narmada and Tapti rivers, one of the most important routes from northern India to the Deccan, it was known as the "key to the Deccan".

== History ==
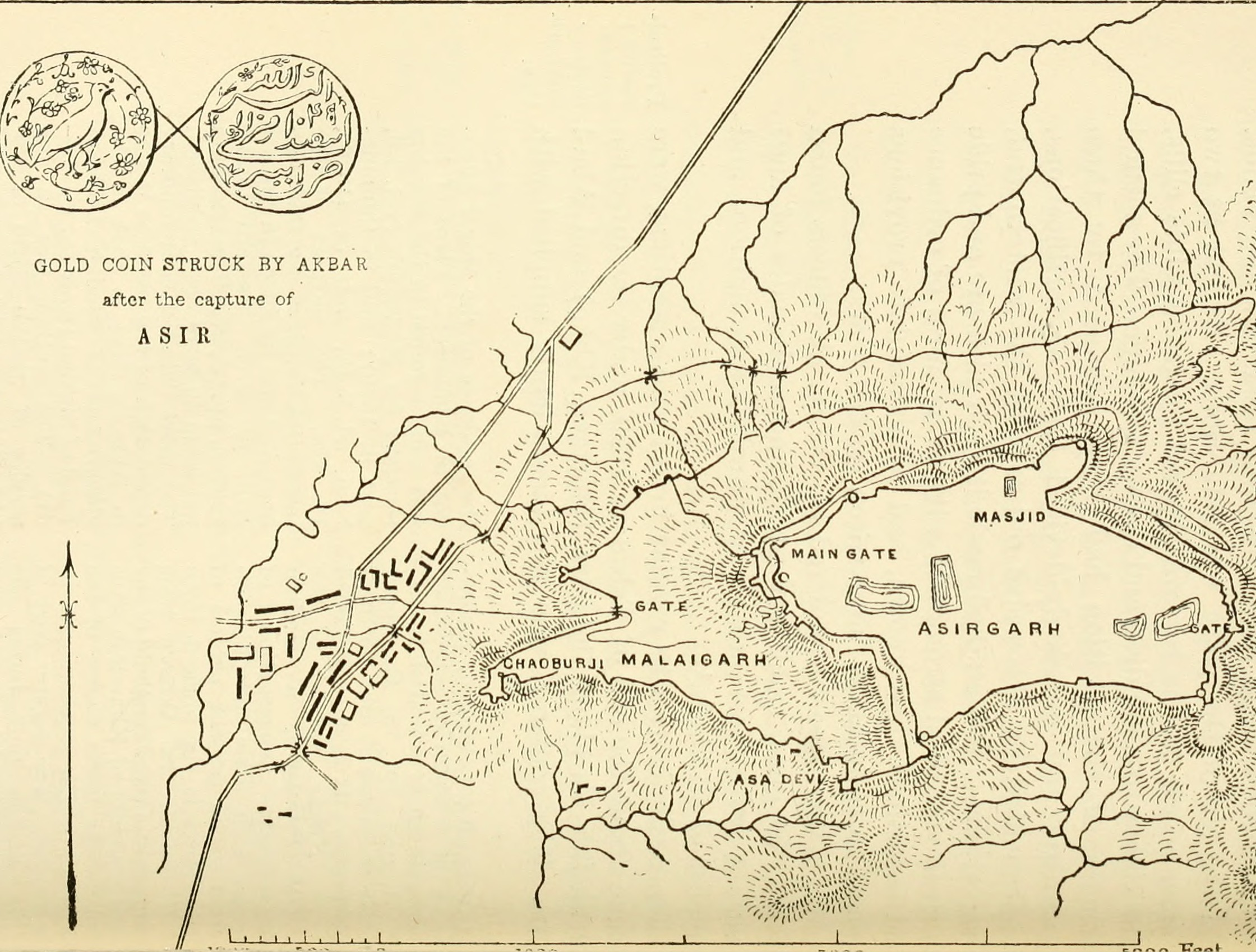
Fort map and image of gold coins issued by Akbar when he captured it.

The Asirgarh fort is said to have been built by Abhira dynasty who held the fort and surrounding territories of Nimar region, which were traditionally their stronghold and were controlled by Yadava since early 9th century till 13th century. The ahirs were later subjugated by Tomar Rajputs and Chauhan Rajput, who later became overlord of area, thus Taunk Rajputs were reduced to feudal status.

Some sources mention that Firishta says it was built by one named Asa ahir .Ahsir or Asir word either might have been used for an impregnable height. Ashir in Hindi means Sun, Fire or Diamond.

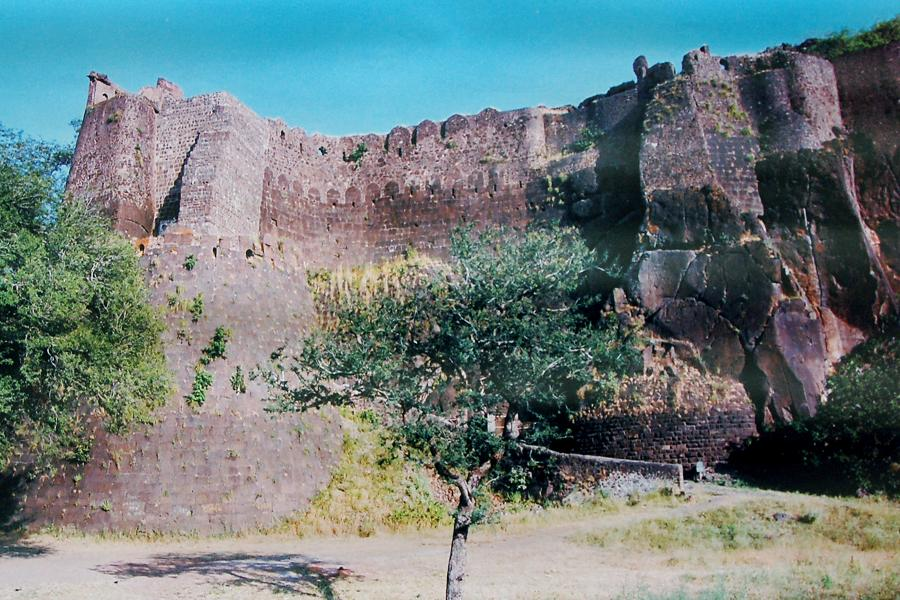
Landscape view of Asirgarh Fort

Sultan Nasir Khan of Khandesh of Faroqis dynasty ruled over Khandesh from Asirgarh from 14th century for more than two centuries. Nasir Khan's descendant Sultan Bahadur Shah declared his independence and refused to pay homage to the Mughal emperor Akbar and his son Daniyal. Akbar marched towards Burhanpur in 1599 and occupied the city. Akbar then besieged Asirgarh fort and captured it on 17 January 1601 by tricking Bahadur Shah.

During the Second Anglo-Maratha War, on 18 October 1803, Company forces took the pettah of Asigarh with a loss of two killed and five wounded. The fort's garrison subsequently surrendered on the 21st after the attackers had erected a battery.

Toward the end of the Third Anglo-Maratha War in early 1819, most Maratha forts had been captured by the British, with the lone holdout being Asirgarh Fort, which was under the command of qiladar Jeswant Rao Lar. In March of that year, a massive British contingent laid siege to Asirgarh, capturing and occupying the town next to the fort to serve as a temporary base of operations. The 1,200-strong garrison was subject to constant artillery bombardments before the British launched an assault, which led to the fort's capture on 9 April. With the capture of Asirgarh Fort, the British victory in the conflict was complete and all military operations ceased.

In March 2025, mass diggings were conducted at the site by locals after the Bollywood film Chhava fictionally depicted the Mughal armies of Aurangzeb burying large amount of gold looted from Shambhaji's camp within the fort promises during the Mughal-Maratha wars.

== Architecture ==
The architecture of the fort is mainly influenced by the Indian architecture, some parts also show Faroqi and Mughal architecture, an amalgamation of Islamic, Persian, Turkish and Indian styles. There are three man made ponds to provide a water supply.

There is a temple known as Gupteshwar Mahadev Mandir, dedicated to the Hindu deity Shiva. There is a local legend that Ashwatthama, a character in the Indian epic Mahābhārata, used to come to this temple to worship and offer flowers each morning to Lord Shiva.

There is a ruined mosque of faroqi era with minarets known as Asir Masjid inside the Fort. Apart from the Hindu and Muslim architecture, some ruins are of British origin and there are also British graves. This fort has been deserted following the departure of the British.
