= Khandesh =

Geographic region in North Maharashtra, India

Coordinates: 21°N 75°E

Khandesh Qhandesh
- Region
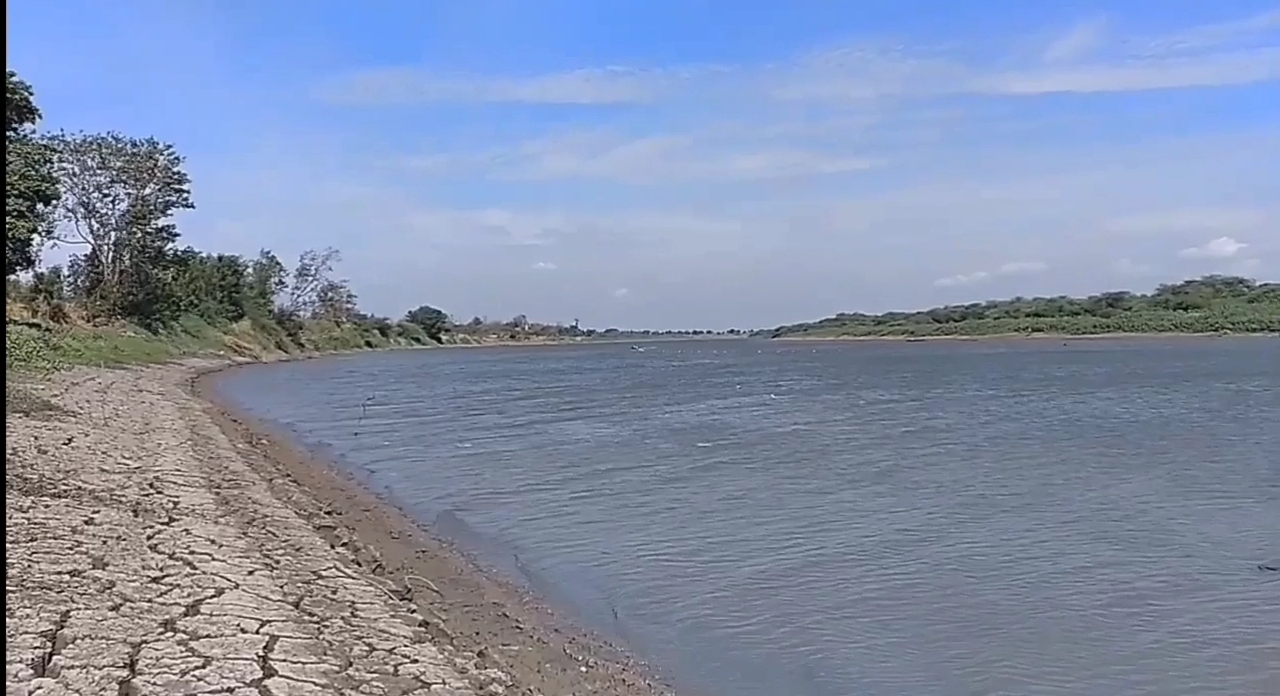
- Panoramic view of Purna river near Muktainagar

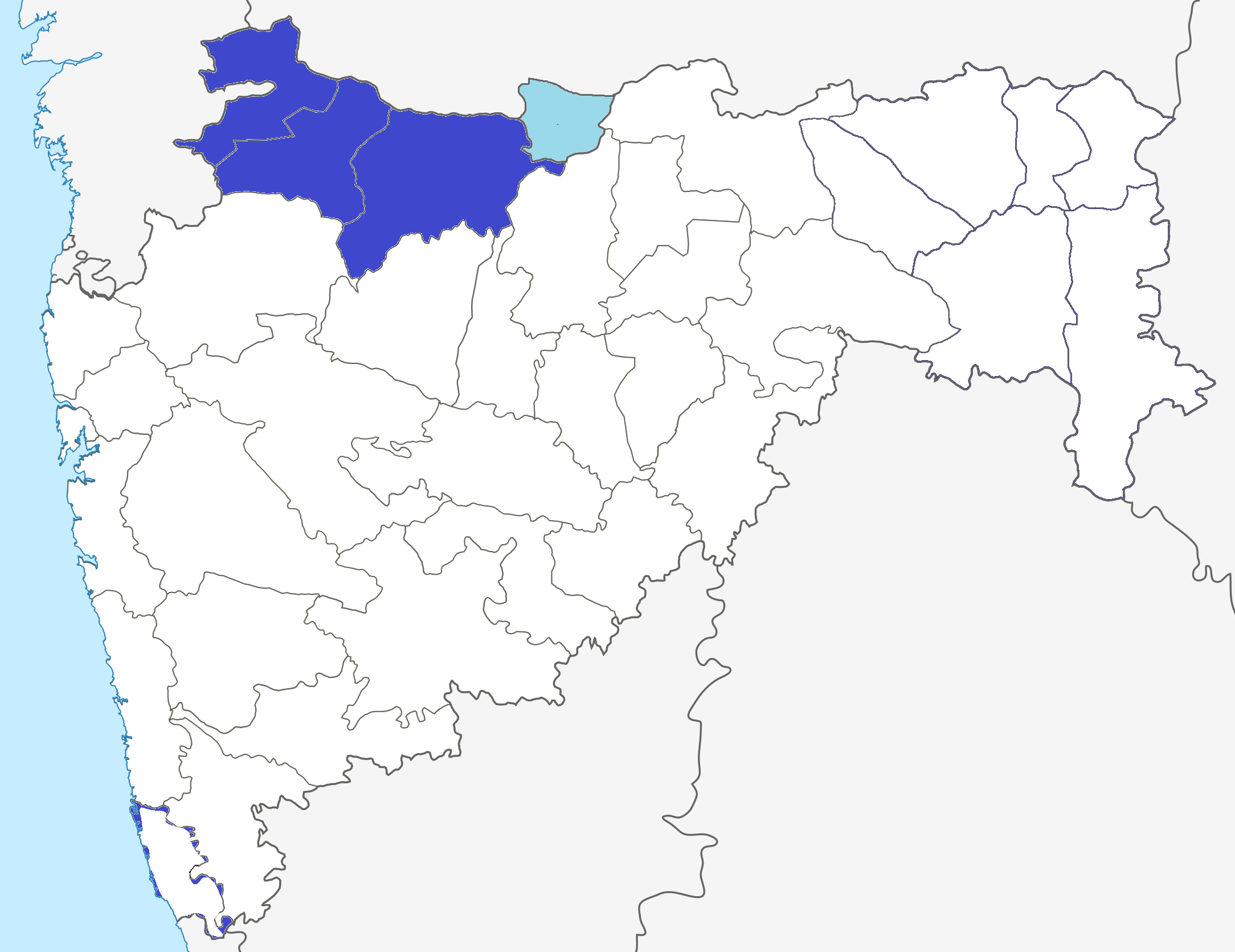
- Blue: Khandesh in Maharashtra
- Country: India
- State: Maharashtra
- Districts: 1. Jalgaon; 2. Dhule; 3. Nandurbar
- Largest City: Jalgaon
- Languages: Marathi, Khandeshi

Area
  - Region: 24,915 km^{2} (9,620 sq mi)
  - Land: 20,015 km^{2} (7,728 sq mi)
  - Water: 4,900 km^{2} (1,900 sq mi) 16.05%
  - Urban: 798 km^{2} (308 sq mi)
  - Metro Jalgaon: 98 km^{2} (38 sq mi)
- Elevation: 230–1,045 m (755–3,428 ft)

Population (2011 census)
  - Region: 7,998,006
  - Density: 322/km^{2} (830/sq mi)
- Demonym: Khandeshi
- Time zone: UTC+5:30 (IST)

Area comprising the Khandesh region of Maharashtra.

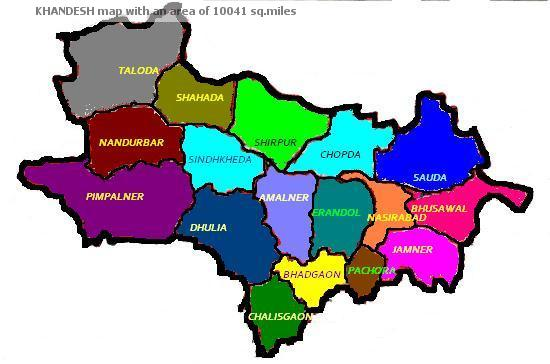
British era's Khandesh District's Map

Khandesh is a geographic region in Maharashtra, India. It was made up of present Jalgaon, Dhule and Nandurbar districts. It also said that Burhanpur District of Madhya Pradesh was also its part.

The region have seen many geographical changes, in 1906 its eponymous district was bifurcated to form two new districts that is West Khandesh, East Khandesh district; Dhule and Jalgaon are their headquarters respectively. In 1990s West Khandesh further divided to form a new, district Nandurbar.

The use of the Khandeshi language is prevalent in this region, and the language itself derives its name from the name of the region. This language is sometimes considered as a dialect of Marathi due to its mutual intelligibility with it, and hence has lower numbers in the census due to people opting their language as Marathi instead. This region is famous for banana agriculture and is a leading producer of it.

== Geography ==
Khandesh lies in Western India on the northwestern corner of the Maharashtra, in the valley of the Tapti River. It is bounded to the north by the Satpura Range, to the east by the Berar (Varhad) region, to the south by the Hills of Ajanta (belonging to the Marathwada region of Maharashtra), and to the west by the northernmost ranges of the Western Ghats.

The principal natural feature is the Tapti River. Unlike the rest of the Deccan, whose rivers rise in the Western Ghats and flow eastward to the Bay of Bengal, the Tapti flows westward from headwaters in southern Madhya Pradesh to empty into the Arabian Sea. The Tapti receives thirteen principal tributaries in its course through Khandesh. None of these rivers is navigable, and the Tapti flows in a deep bed which historically made it difficult to use for irrigation. Most of Khandesh lies south of the Tapti and is drained by its tributaries: the Gomai, Girna, Bori, and Panjhra. The alluvial plain north of the Tapti contains some of the richest tracts in Khandesh, and the land rises towards the Satpuda hills. In the centre and east, the country is level, save for some low ranges of barren hills. To the north and west, the plain rises into rugged hills, thickly wooded, and inhabited by members of the Bhil tribe.

== History ==
=== Ancient history ===
The Markandeya Purana and Jain literature describe Khanadesh region as Abhiradesa. The rule of the Abhiras over this region is not only evident from the epigraphs but from the oral traditions also. A tradition of Nandurbar (Khandesh) presents before us an account of an Ahir Raja Nanda, who fought the Turks. The abhira was in Mahabharata and then it was considered as a kanhadesh (Krishna)

=== Delhi dynasties ===
In 1295, Khandesh was under the Chauhan ruler of Asirgarh when Ala-ud-din Khilji of Delhi wrested control. Various Delhi dynasties controlled Khandesh over the next century, until Khandesh gained independence as the Khandesh Sultanate in the late 14th century, established by Malik Raja as the Farooqui dynasty.

=== Mughal rule ===
The Mughals arrived in 1599, when Akbar's army overran Khandesh and captured Asirgarh. For a period of time, Khandesh was renamed as Dandesh in recognition of Akbar's son Daniyal. c. 1640, Todar Mal's revenue settlement system was introduced in Khandesh by Shah Jahan (this system was used until British rule in 1818). The mid-17th century has been described as the time of Khandesh's "highest prosperity" owing to trade in cotton, rice, indigo, sugarcane, and cloth. Mughal rule lasted until the Marathas captured Asirgarh in 1760.

During Mughal rule, Burhanpur was the capital of the Khandesh Subah, an administrative provincial division of the Mughal Empire. Early in December 1670, Maratha forces under Prataprao made a raid into Khandesh. They advanced in rapid marches and plundered Bahadarpur, a village near Burhanpur 2 miles away from the city. But they didn't attack Burhanpur.

=== Maratha rule ===
Maratha raids into Khandesh began in 1670 and the following century was a period of unrest as Mughals and Marathas competed for control. In 1760, the Peshwa ousted the Mughal ruler and gained control of Khandesh, following which portions were granted to Holkar and Scindia rulers. Baji Rao II surrendered to the British in June 1818, but sporadic war continued in Khandesh which was among the last of the Peshwa's former territories to come under complete British control.

=== British rule ===
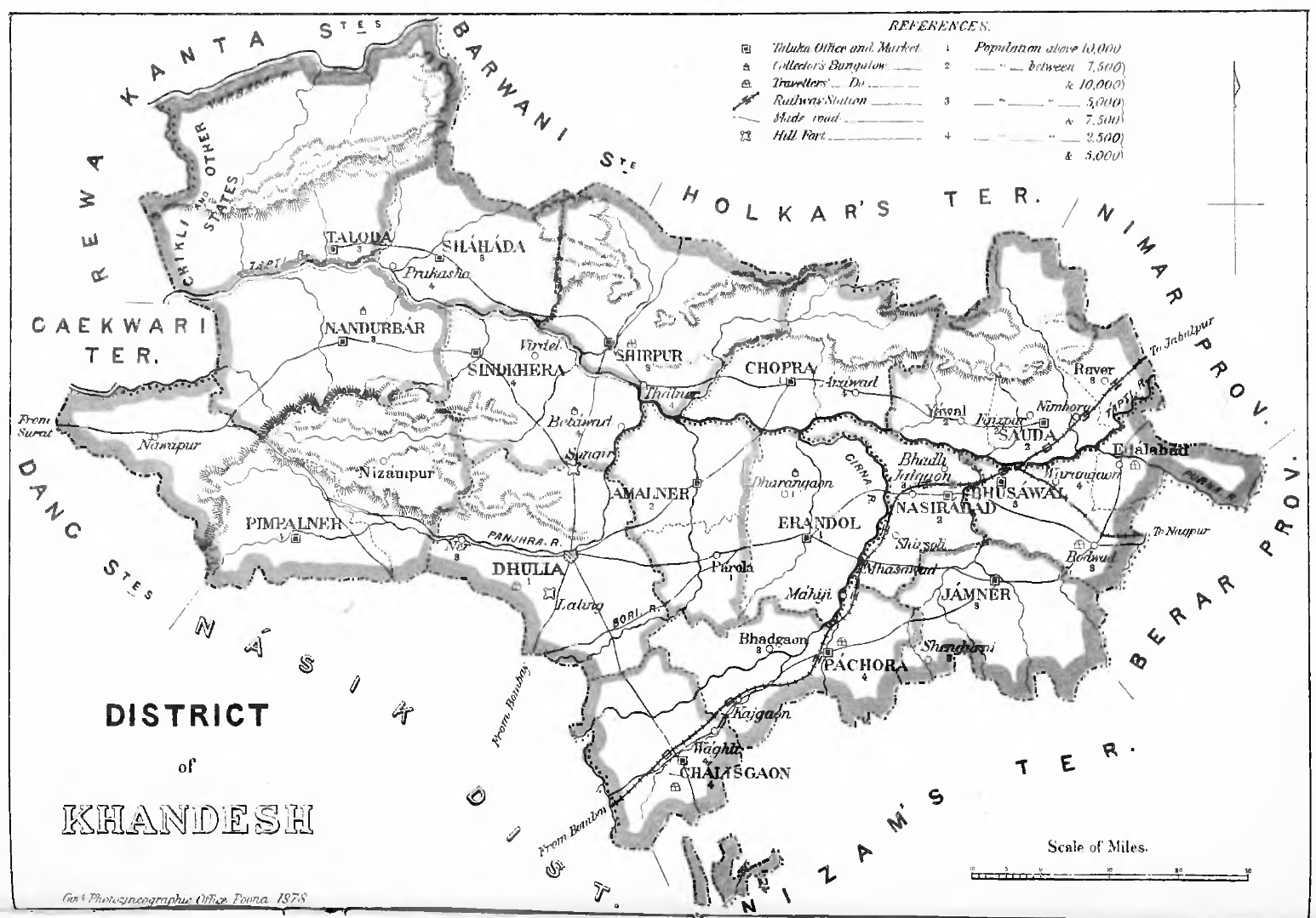
Khandesh District (1878)

Khandesh was a district in the Bombay Presidency. In 1906, the district was divided into two districts: East Khandesh, headquartered at Jalgaon, had an area of 11,770 km^{2} (4,544 sq mi), while West Khandesh, headquartered at Dhule, had an area of 14,240 km^{2} (5,497 sq mi); their respective populations were 957,728 and 469,654 in 1901.

=== Independent India ===
After India's independence in 1947, Bombay province became Bombay State, and in 1960 was divided into the linguistic states of Maharashtra and Gujarat. East Khandesh became Jalgaon district, and West Khandesh became Dhule district, both in Maharashtra state. The latter was further divided into Dhule and Nandurbar districts. This region has a population of 8,686,921 people (including Burhanpur district of MP) as of 2011 Census.

== See also ==
- Khandesh Agency
- Abhiras of Bhambhagiri
