= Cave research in India =

Cave research, encompassing the study of speleology and biospeleology, is still in its infancy in India. Although there are thousands of caves in India, research expeditions occur in few states. The Siju Cave in Meghalaya is the first limelighted natural cave from India. Several studies were carried out in this cave in the early 20th century. The Kotumsar Cave in Central India is one of the most explored caves of India, and biologists have classified many types of cavernicoles, i.e. trogloxenes, troglophiles and troglobites, from this cave.

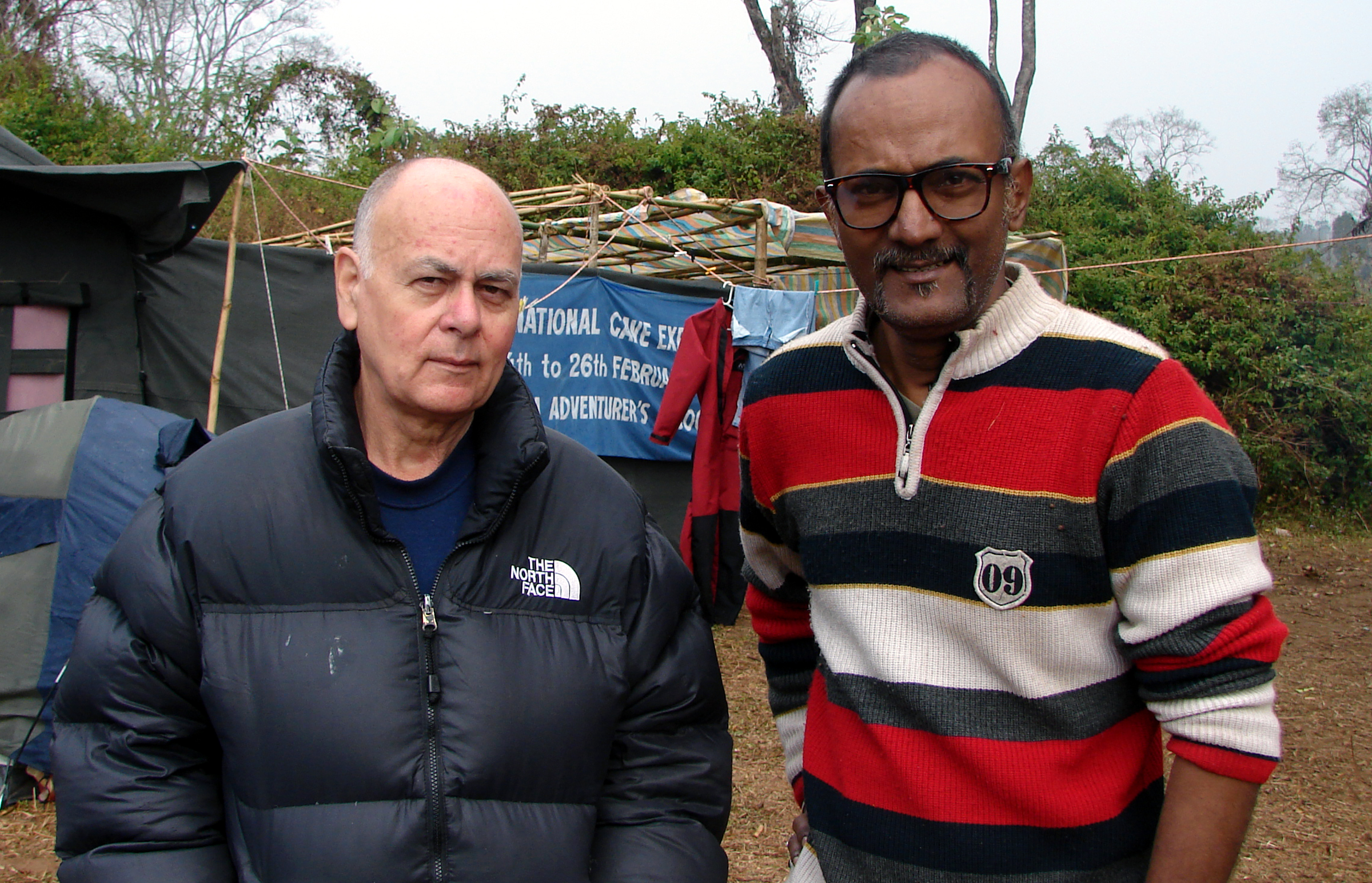
Brian Dermot Kharpran Daly (Left) & Dr. Jayant Biswas (Right)

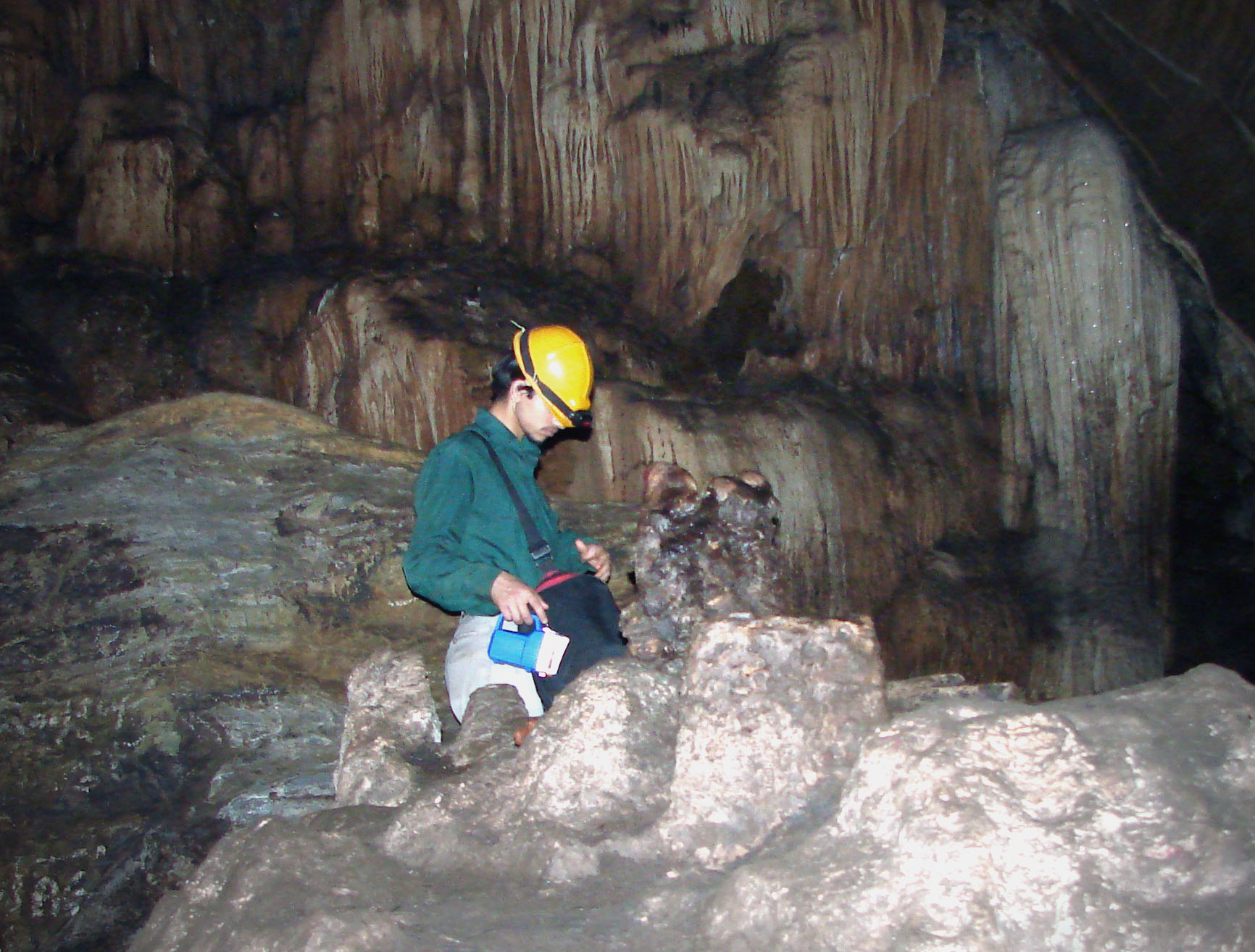
Researcher in search of Biodiversity inside the Kotumsar Cave

The Indian institution mainly engaged in this particular field of research and conservation issues of Indian caves is the Raipur-based National Cave Research and Protection Organisation (founded and headed by Dr Jayant Biswas). The other notable organisation is Meghalaya Adventurer Association (founded and managed by Brian Dermot Kharpran Daly) which mainly involved in the caving and cave explorations of the existing caves of the state Meghalaya.

== Caving regions ==
=== Andhra Pradesh ===
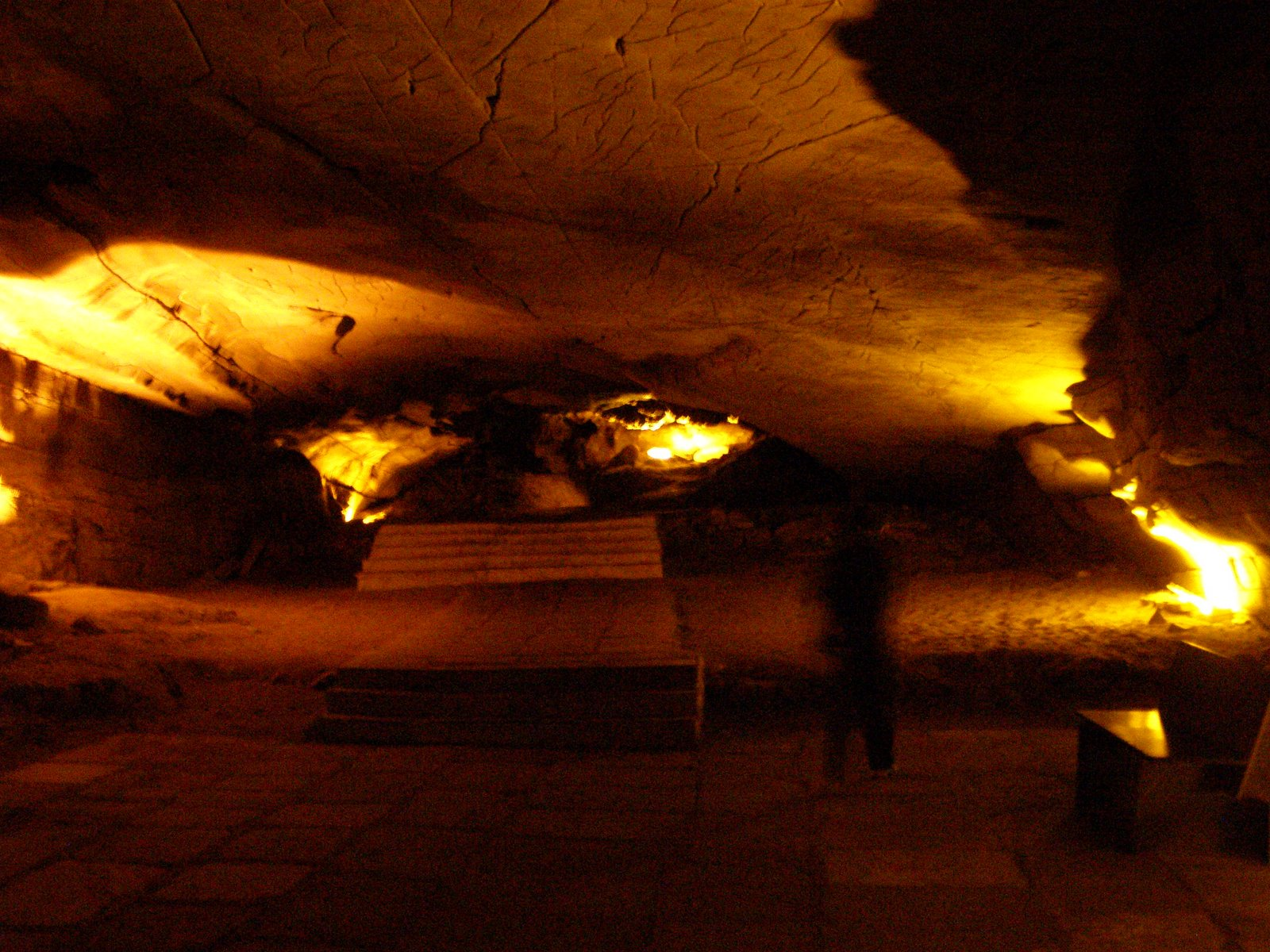
Meditation Hall inside Belum Caves

- Akka Mahadevi Cavesetc.
- Belum Caves, length: 3,229 m (10,594 ft), Belum Village in Kolimigundla mandal of Nandyal district, 15.102346°N 78.111541°E
- Borra Caves, length: 625 m (2,051 ft)
- Guthikonda Caves,
- Guntupalli Caves,
- Moghalrajapuram Caves,
- Undavalli Caves
- Yaganti Caves,
- Eswari devi caves,

=== Chhattisgarh ===
- Aranyak Cave of Kanger Ghati National Park
- Dandak Cave of Kanger Ghati National Park, length: 362 m (1,188 ft)
- Kailash Caves of Kanger Ghati National Park, length: 253 m (830 ft)
- Devgiri Cave of Kanger Ghati National Park
- Jhumar Cave of Pedawada village Kanger Ghati National Park
- Jogi Cave of Gadiya Mountain Kanker, length: 50 m (160 ft)
- Kailash Cave of Jashpur district, Chhattisgarh
- Kanak Cave of Kanger Ghati National Park (yet unexplored)
- Kapatdwar Cave of Tokapal, Bastar, length: 30 m (98 ft)
- Khuriarani Cave of Bagicha Village Jashpur district, Chhattisgarh, length: 27 m (89 ft)
- Kotumsar Cave of Kanger Ghati National Park, length: 660 m (2,170 ft)
- Mandhip Khol, Gandai, Rajanandgaon length: 430 m (1,410 ft)
- Mendhkamaari Cave of Kanger Ghati National Park
- Rani Cave of Tokapal, Bastar, length: 50 m (160 ft)
- Shakal Narayan Cave of Bhopalpatnam, Bijapur district, Chhattisgarh
- Shankanpalli Caves of Bijapur district, Chhattisgarh
- Sheet Cave of Kanger Ghati National Park, length: 25 m (82 ft)
- Singhanpur cave, Raigarh (yet unexplored)
- Sondayi cave, Kanker, length: 40 m (130 ft)
- Tular Cave of Narayanpur District, Chhattisgarh
- Usur Cave of Usur Block, Bijapur district, Chhattisgarh

=== Haryana ===
None of these have been studied scientifically yet.

- Dhosi Hill cave in Aravalli Mountain Range, Narnaul, Mahendragarh district
- Tosham Hill cave in Aravalli Mountain Range, Hisar-Tosham road, Bhiwani district
- Nar Narayan Cave in Sivalik Hills range, Yamuna Nagar district

=== Madhya Pradesh ===
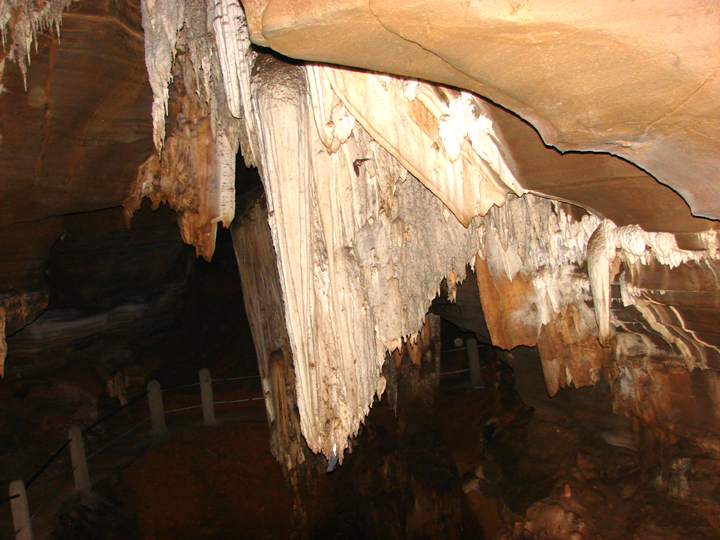
Dandak Cave, Chhattisgarh

- Bagh Caves of Dhar district
- Bhimbetka cave of Raisen District
- Jana Mana Cave of Kanha National Park
- New cave in Raisen District, few ancient caves of Madhya Pradesh are well known. Few more caves have also been recently limelighted.

=== Meghalaya ===
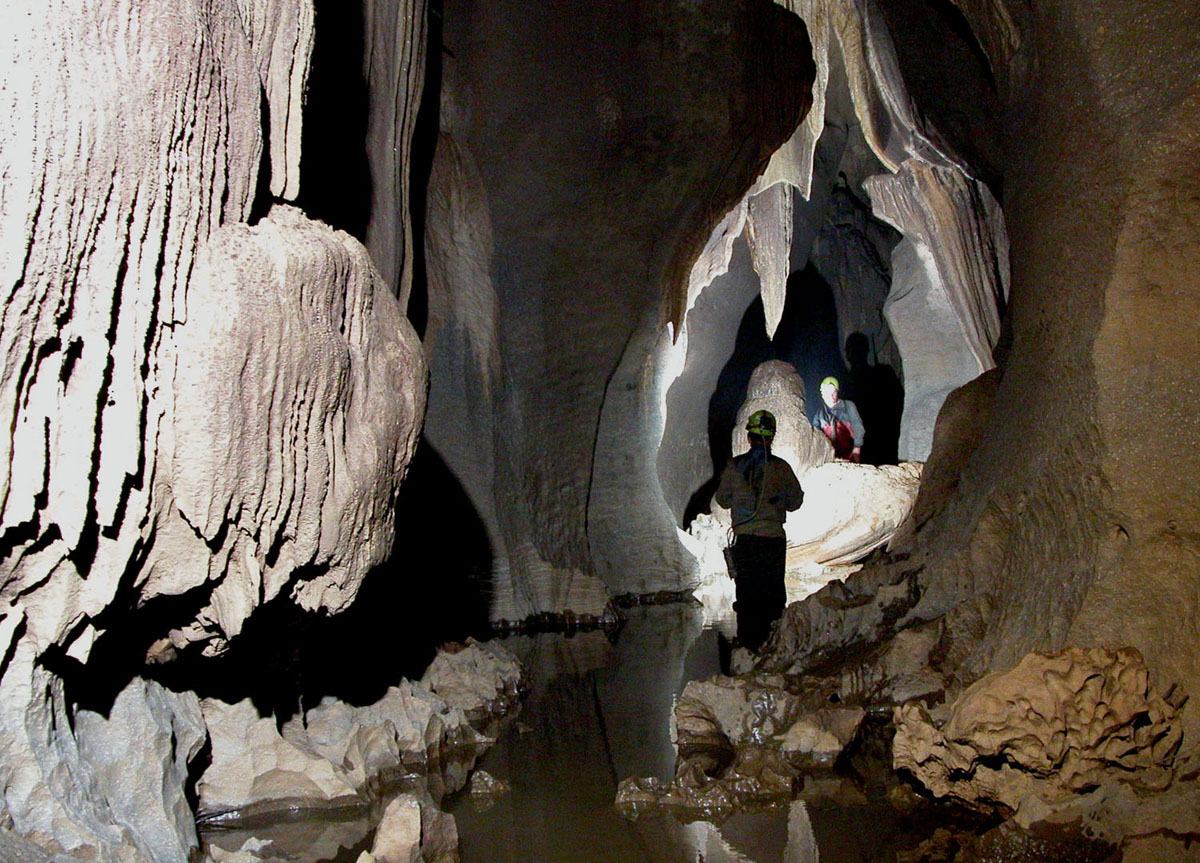
Expedition is in progress in Meghalayan Caves

The Indian state, Meghalaya is famous for its many caves, which attract tourists not only from India but abroad too. A few of the caves in this region have been listed amongst the longest and deepest in the world.

==== Khasi hills ====
- Krem Dam, length: 1,297 m (4,255 ft)
- Krem Mawmluh (4th longest in the Indian sub continent)
- Krem Mawsynram
- Krem Phyllut, length: 1,003 m (3,291 ft)
- Krem Soh Shympi (Mawlong, East Khasi Hills), length: 760 m (2,490 ft)
- Mawsmai Cave (show cave exclusively for tourists)

==== Jaintia hills ====
- Ka Krem Pubon Rupasor or The Rupasor Cave
- Krem Kotsati, length: 3,650 m (11,980 ft)
- Krem Lashinng, length: 2,650 m (8,690 ft)
- Krem Liat Prah, length: approx 31 km (Longest in the Indian Subcontinent)
- Krem Sweep, length: 970 m (3,180 ft)
- Krem Um-Lawan, length: 6,381 m (20,935 ft)
- Krem Umshangktat, length: 955 m (3,133 ft)

==== Garo Hills ====
- Bok Bak Dobhakol, length: 1,051 m (3,448 ft)
- Dobhakol Chibe Nala, length: 1,978 m (6,490 ft)
- Siju-Dobkhakol, length: 4,772 m (15,656 ft)
- Tetengkol-Balwakol, length: 5,334 m (17,500 ft)

Most of the caves of these areas were either discovered or surveyed by the Europeans (especially by German, British and Italian cavers). Herbert Daniel Gebauer, Simon Brooks, Thomas Arbenz and Rosario Ruggieri are the most prominent name among them. Brian Khapran-Daly of Meghalaya Adventure association have expedite most of the Caves of Meghalaya (stated above). In addition to these, the cavers' associations of Meghalaya have always been found to be active in cave discoveries of that plateau.

=== Uttarakhand ===
- Gauri Udiyar Cave in Bageshwar district
- Khatling Cave in Tehri Garhwal district
- Lakhudiyar Caves in Almora district
- Pandkholi Cave in Ranikhet district
- Patal Bhuvaneshwar Cave in Pithoragarh district
- Rai Cave in Pithoragarh district
- Robber's Cave (Guchhupani) in Dehradun district
- Shivam Cave in Pithoragarh district
- Sukhram Cave in Bageshwar district
- Vashishtha Cave in Rishikesh

and many more scientifically unexplored caves

== Cultural importance ==
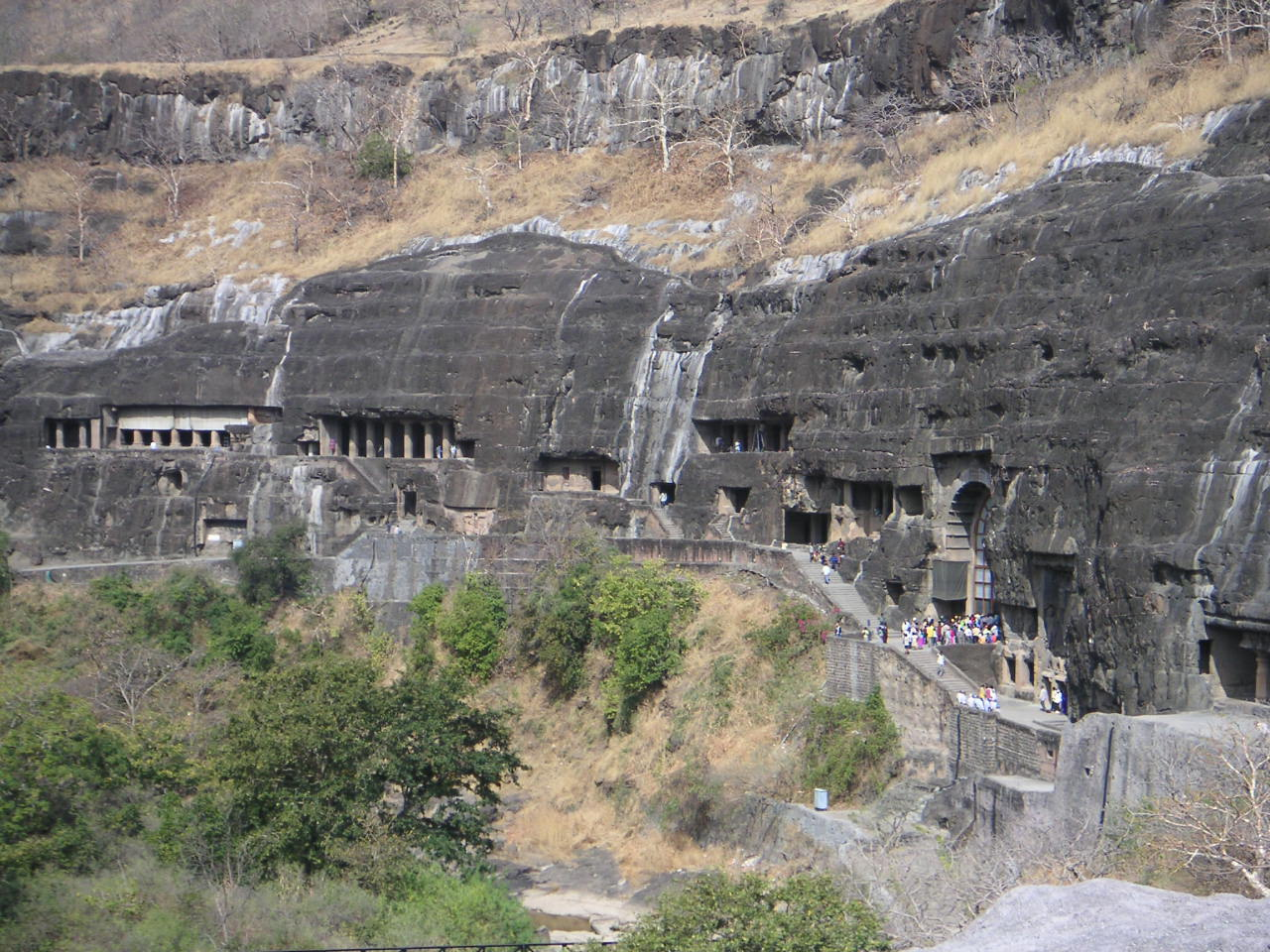
Panorama of the Ajanta caves

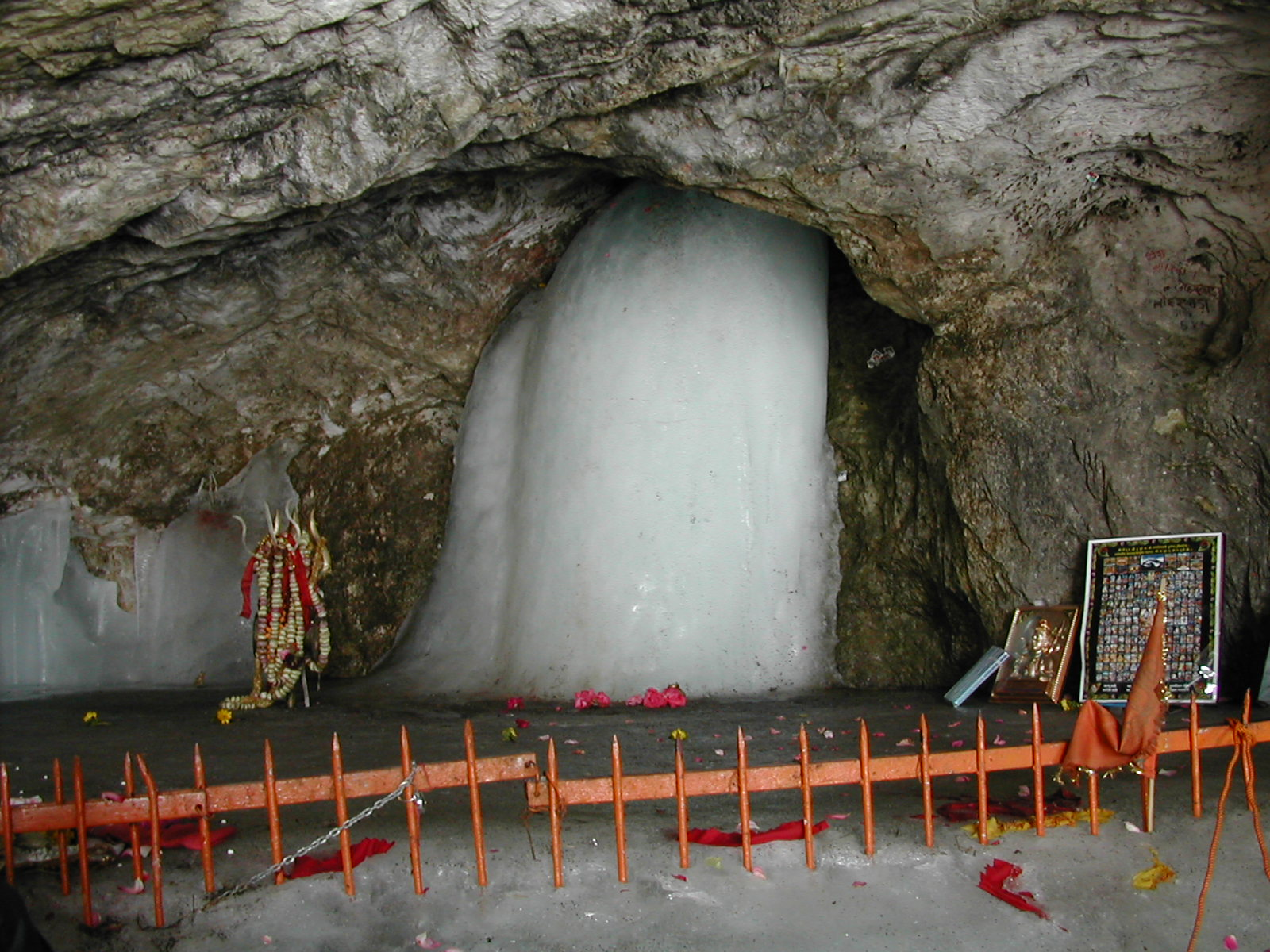
Ice Shiva Lingam in the Holy Cave

In India, many caves are popular tourist sites. The caves of Ajanta, Udaygiri, Barabar, Undavalli, Pandavleni, Ellora are famous for archaeological finds and ancient architectural value.

== Religious importance ==
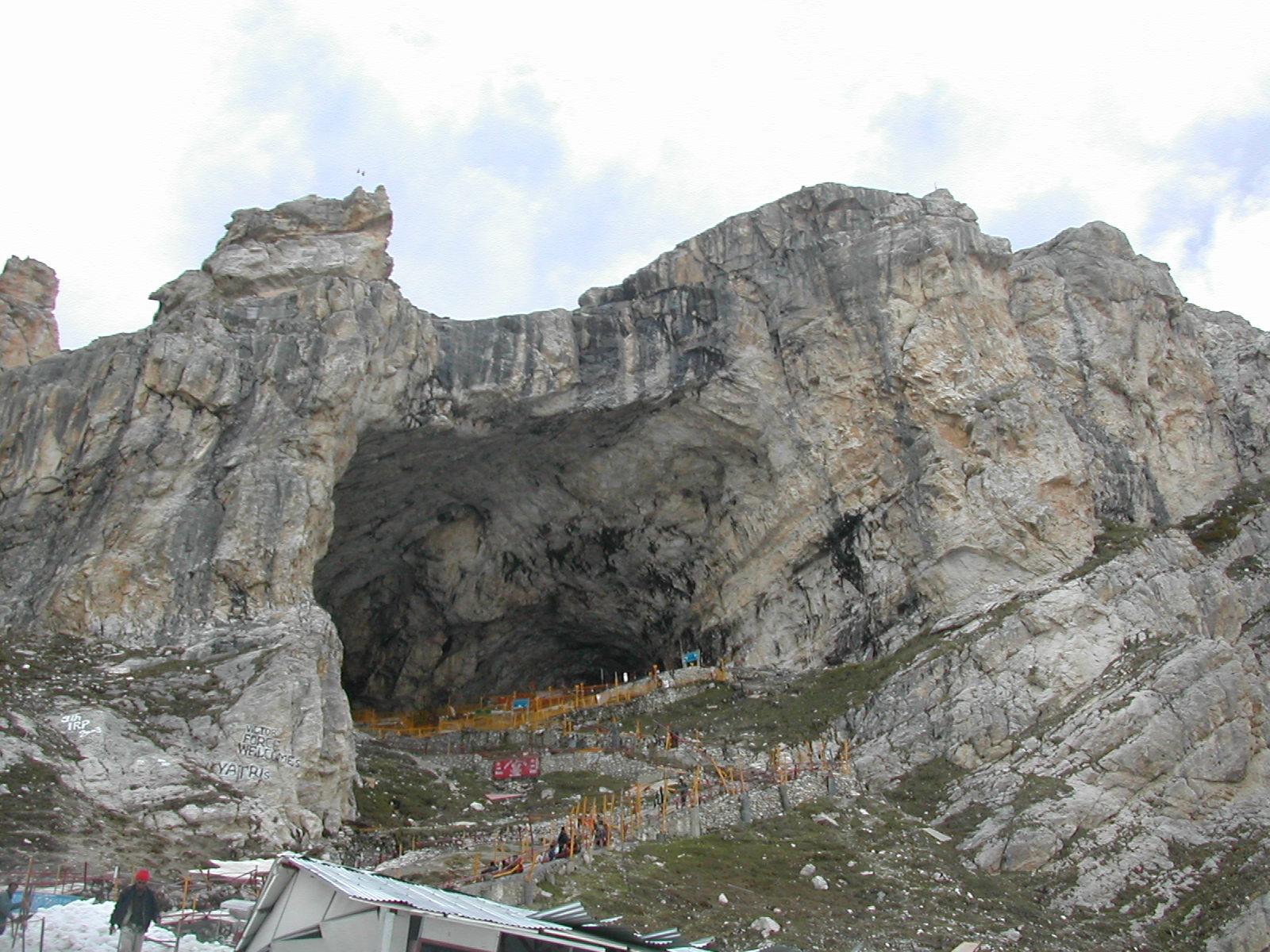
Cave Temple of Amarnath

The stalagmite formations present in most natural limestone caves resemble Shiva Linga, a representation of Hindu God Shiva, due to which some of the caves in India are considered of religious import. In addition, several universally known caves related to Buddhism is also exist in India. The same attraction leads local people to visit small caves as it draws tourists to large show caves. In India, Amarnath Temple caves, Vaishno Devi Mandir, Badami Cave Temples, Hulimavu Shiva cave temple, Mahakali Caves, Mandapeshwar Caves, Pandavleni Caves are some of the caves with religious importance.

== Current research ==
Jayant Biswas and his contemporaries continue to research the biospeleology of Meghalaya, Chhattisgarh, Uttarakhand and Western Ghats to establish India amongst other notable countries on the cave map of the world.

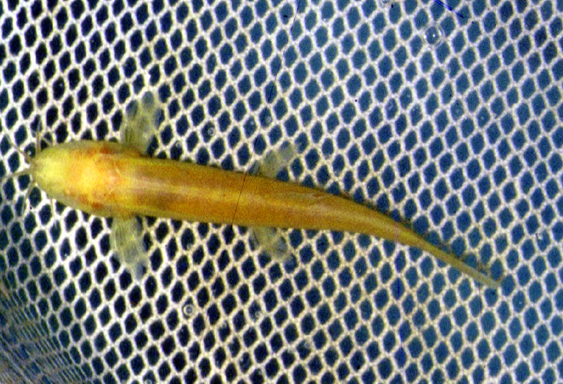
The blind and albinic cavefish ( Nemacheilus evezardi) from Kotumsar Cave, India

Research is also taking place on Indian cave stalagmites, to estimate the past monsoon climate. Dr Ashish Sinha of California State University is taking major steps to understand the past pattern of Indian monsoons via cave research. In addition, Prof. Rengaswamy Ramesh; Dr. M. G. Yadava of Physical Research Laboratory, Ahmedabad; Prof. Bahadur Kotlia of The Durham, Kumaun University Nainital; Dr. Syed Masood Ahmad & Mahjoor A. Lone, CSIR - National Geophysical Research Institute (NGRI), Hyderabad; Dr. Anoop Kumar Singh of The Lucknow, Department of Geology, University of Lucknow; and Dr. Jayant Biswas, National Cave Research and Protection Organisation, India, also initiated some research in this direction.

Besides Dr. Biswas, Prof. G. Marimuthu of Madurai Kamaraj University, Madurai (Chiropterology - study of Bats); Prof. Y. Ranga Reddy Acharya Nagarjuna University (micro Crustacean: Taxonomy); Dr. Daniel Harries of Edinburgh (Cave Biodiversity) and Dr. Adora Thabah of Bristol University (Chiropterology - study of Bats); Prof. R. K. Pradhan Pandit Ravishankar Shukla University of Raipur (Chronobiology); Prof. Ramanathan Baskar Guru Jambheshwar University of Science and Technology, Hisar, Haryana (Cave Geomicrobiology) are some of the known researchers who have tried to shed some light on the Biospeleology (study of organisms that live in caves) of Indian caves.

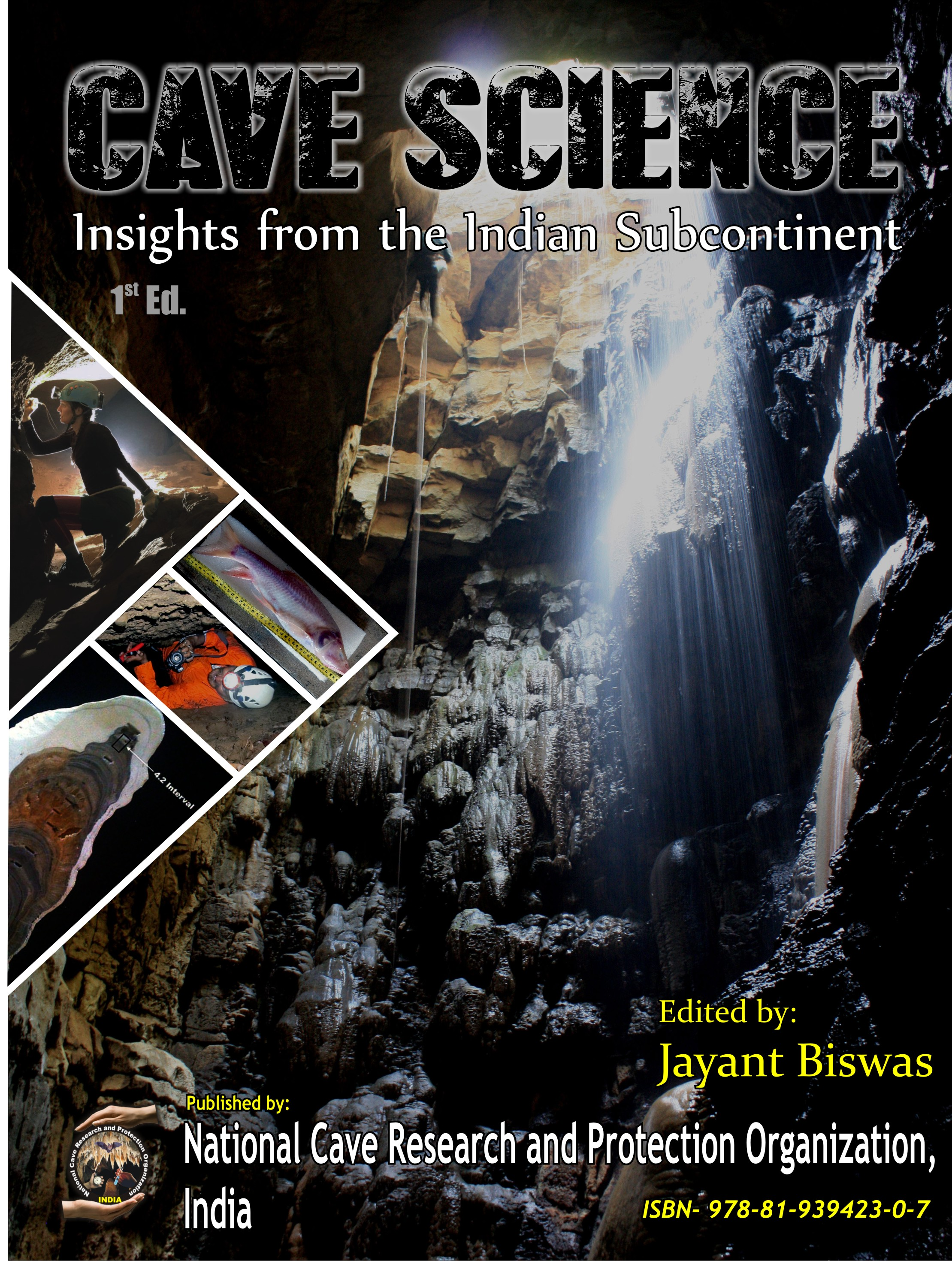
The first Text cum Research Reference book on "Cave Science" from India

The very first Text cum Research Reference Book from India is published in the year 2022, titled "Cave Science, Insights from the Indian Subcontinent" The book is Published by National cave Research and Protection Organization, edited by Jayant Biswas. This book contains total Eight Chapters, covering -Indian Caves, -Paleoclimatology, -Biospeleology, -Chiropterology, -Geomicrobiology, -Hydrogeology, -Palaeoanthropology and -Cave Conservancy. The book received a very good review, published in a very prestigious Scientific Journal of India

== Notable Findings from Caves of India ==
The Earth's age in which we are living is Meghalayan age and the name was given in 2018, by the International Commission on Stratigraphy (ICS) and formally ratified by the Executive Committee of the International Union of Geological Sciences (IUGS), The research output was based on a study of Palaeoclimatology of a rock structure Stalactite collected from the Mawmluh Cave of Meghalaya.

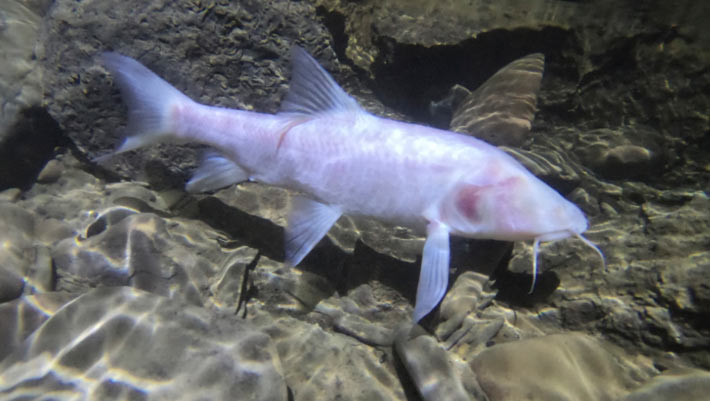
Neolissochilus pnar, a large cave carp species (Neolissochilus pnar) from caves in Meghalaya, India

The biggest Cavefish of the world Neolissochilus pnar is identified from a cave of Meghalaya. Further, longest Sandstone Cave of the world was also found in Meghalaya.

== Conservation ==
Unscientific quarrying of limestone led to the collapse of the Mawmluh cave of Meghalaya, and the caves of Jantia Hills are also in danger due to excessive quarrying of coal. Various caves in Central India serving as major religious spots are also either under threat conditions or somehow polluting the ambient environment.

The 'National Cave Research and Protection Organisation, India' has been formed to help protect the caves of India. This organization has already urged the Indian government to frame a proper Cave Protection Act. In addition, members of the Meghalaya Adventures Association (principally, Brian Kharpan Dally) work to protect the natural caves of Meghalaya.

== See also ==
- List of India cave temples
- List of Caves in India
- List of rock-cut temples in India
- Indian rock-cut architecture
- List of colossal sculpture in situ
- Pit cave
- List of caves
