= Parveen Farzana Absar =

Wildlife biologist

Parveen F. Absar is a wildlife biologist from India. In 2017, she was credited with the discovery of a species of freshwater crab called Teretamon absarum, of the genus Teretamon and species spelaeum.

== Early life ==
Parveen Farzana Absar was born in 1988, to Ahsan Absar and Farzana Absar.

== Education and career ==
Absar earned her master's degree in Wildlife Sciences from Aligarh Muslim University (AMU), in Aligarh, Uttar Pradesh, India, in June 2017. She did her dissertation under Orus Ilyas, an assistant professor in the Wildlife Sciences Department at AMU.

Since September 2019, Absar has been a Doctoral Candidate in the School of Biological Sciences at the University of Auckland, New Zealand.

== Teretamon absarum ==
=== Discovery ===
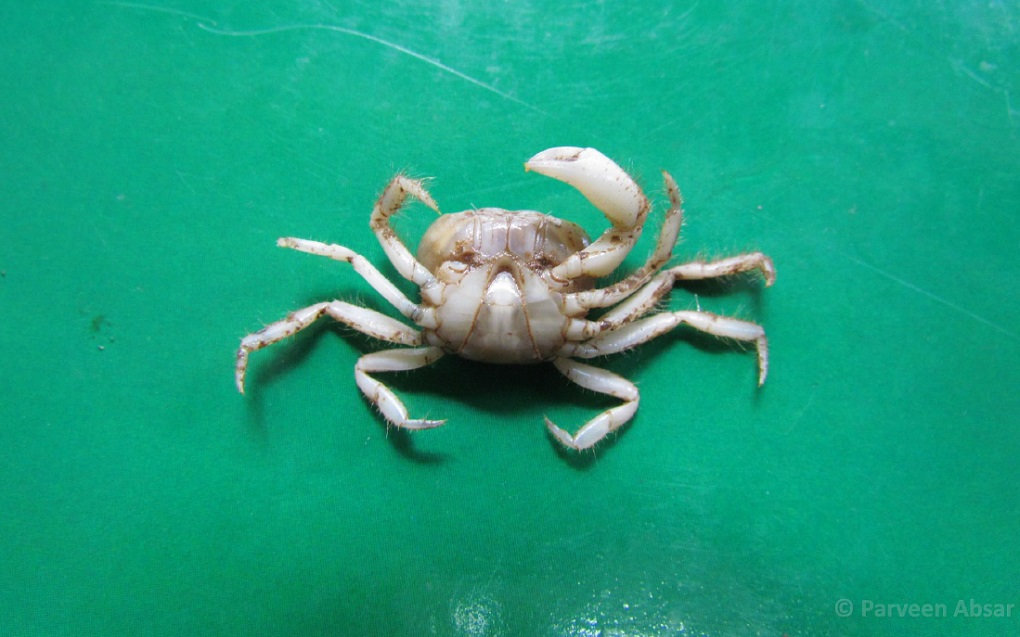
Underside view of Teretamon spelaeum (Male). It is smaller than the female, and this specimen has one missing claw. Credits: Parveen F. Absar.

Absar discovered the species in Meghalaya, which is in the northeastern Himalayan region of India. At the time of discovery, Absar was 29 years old and had 11 years of experience. She was in the East Jaintia Hills district of Meghalaya two months prior to this discovery, conducting cave research for her dissertation at AMU. In her dissertation, she highlights the presence of thick limestone in Meghalaya's caves as being a rich abode for various life forms, from invertebrates to advanced vertebrates, and identifies the region as rich for study in biospeleology. The caves in Meghalaya are some of the most famous in India, particularly for research; Meghalaya has 1,580 identified caves, including nine out of ten of the longest and deepest caves in India. Moreover, Absar emphasizes the unexplored scope of cave biology research in the already explored caves of Meghalaya. Meghalaya is already considered to be one of India's four biodiversity hotspots, with there being a total of 34 hotspots globally.

On a routine expedition for her research, on 29 March 2017, Absar stumbled upon the species 200 metres from the mouth of the eighth longest cave in the country (length of 7.3 km); the name of the cave is currently being kept confidential at the ask of the research team. In an interview with The Third Pole, Absar described that she was on a routine exploration and saw the crabs on her way out; she found a male, female, and a baby crab.

=== Classification ===
Absar brought this finding to the notice of her contact at the Zoological Survey of India (ZSI) in Kolkata, Ilona Jacinta Kharkongor. Kharkongor is a scientist in Meghalaya, specialising in cave biology; she reached out to ZSI headquarters in the city of Kolkata to inform them of Absar's findings. In the next few days, ZSI's team––led by Santanu Mitra––confirmed that her specimen was previously undiscovered. ZSI, in further collaboration with international experts, classified it within the genus Teretamon. Absar was asked to name the species, and chose to name it "absarum" as a tribute to her parents and family name. The species has been officially named Teretamon spelaeum,.

=== Genus Teretamon ===
This is only the third species discovered so far under this genus: the first one was found in Myanmar and the second one was found in the Indian state of Mizoram. However, both the previously found species were either forest or freshwater species, as compared to Teretamon spelaeum, which is cave-dwelling. Teretamon spelaeum was the first troglobite, or cave-dwelling species, of crab found in India.

This is the second crab in the genus to be found in India. The first was Teretamon Yeo & Ng, or Teretamon kempi, and it was discovered in Mizoram by Santanu Mitra, a scientist at ZSI in 2016, Arajush Payra and Kailash Chandra. This crab, however, was a freshwater crab. In 2021, a fourth crab in the genus Teretamon and a second crab in the species kempi has thought to have been discovered: In Husa Town, Yunnan Province, China, scientists Da Pan, Boyang Shi, and Hongying Sun have identified Teretamon husicum.

=== Distinctive morphology ===
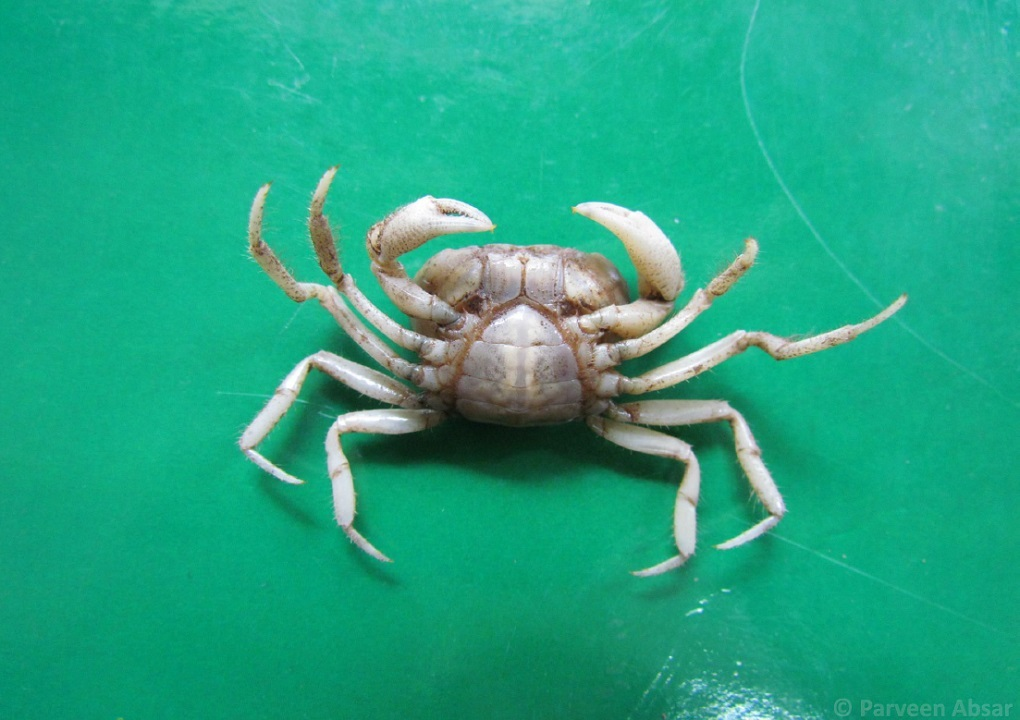
Underside view of female Teretamon spelaeum. Note the hair on the legs, a distinctive morphological characteristic. Credits: Parveen F. Absar.

As a crab-dwelling species, Teretamon spelaeum has physiological characteristics that are adapted to living in the dark zones of caves, in which temperatures remain almost constant. A part of this adaptation is the color of the crab; it is albino crab, meaning it has no coloring pigment, due to the absence of light in its environment. Furthermore, it is almost blind.

While other blind albino cave crabs have been found in Asian countries––such as China, Vietnam, Thailand, Indonesia––this species is particularly different from other blind albino crabs. The other crabs tended to be larger (up to 2 inches, or 5.08 centimeters), and have serrated bodies, small eye sockets, and hairless legs, and; in comparison, Teretamon spelaeum is much smaller (approximately 2 centimeters, or 0.79 inches), has a smooth body, and has hair on its shorter, more slender legs. It also has a large eye socket, but a much smaller retina than other albino crabs.

Amongst other crabs from the genus Teretamon, the spelaeum species differs in its:

- Wider carapace, the hard upper shell
- Much smaller retina, in a larger eye socket
- Distinctive gonopod, an appendage specialized for reproduction: It has a low, rounded median flap on the upper side of the terminal joint of its gonads

Teretamon spelaeum was published in Zootaxa, an international peer-reviewed journal for taxonomy, in 2017. Absar shares credit for her finding with Santanu Mitra, the lead collaborator and researcher on the team at ZSI, and Ilona Kharkongor, a fellow researcher focused on cave biology in Meghalaya.

== See also ==
- Crustacean
- Crabs
- Cave Research in India
- Biospeleology
- Albinism

== Listed publications ==
- Absar, P.F., Mitra, S. & Kharkongor, I.J. 2017. Teretamon spelaeum, a new species of freshwater crab (Crustacea: Decapoda: Potamidae) from a limestone cave in Meghalaya, India. Zootaxa 4365(3): 302–310. DOI: 10.11646/zootaxa.4365.3.2.
