= Susri Dam =

Susri dam
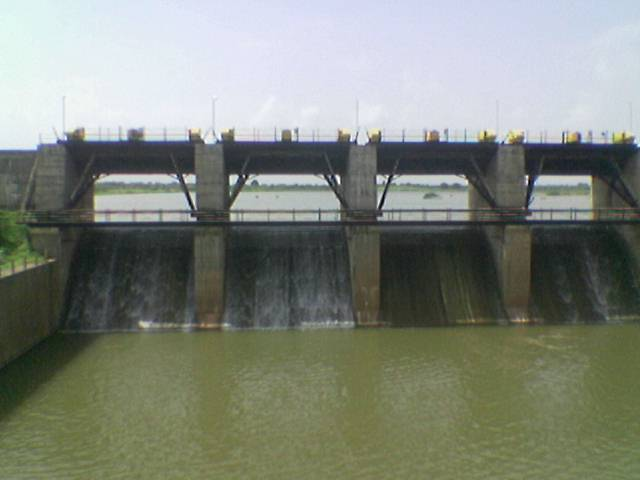

- Location within Maharashtra
- Official name: Susri dam
- Location: Shahada
- Coordinates: 21.596660°N 74.496660°E
- Owners: Government of Maharashtra, India

Dam and spillways
- Impounds: Gomai river

Susri Dam, also known as Mahavir Bandhara (Mahavir Levee), is located around 7 kilometres (4.3 mi) north of Shahada, Nandurbar district in the state of Maharashtra, India. Susri Dam is a Diversion dam.

Susri River is affluent of Gomai River. Both rivers originate in the Satpura Mountain Range. Near Dara faata, which is 7 kilometres (4.3 mi) north of Shahada, both rivers used to flow just 200–250 metres (660–820 ft) apart. Around 10 years ago Engineers built a Levee to block the path of the water of the Susri river. A barrage was constructed in such a way that excess water in Susri river and hence Susri dam is released in Gomai river which is just 50–60 metres (160–200 ft) away from Susri dam barrage. Water in the Susri dam is used for irrigation.

Susri dam is called 'Mahavir Bandhara' on official record because several centuries old Mahavir Sculpture in Gomai river is just around 500 metres (1,600 ft) away from Susri dam barrage. Susri dam (Mahavir bandhara) office is built on the bank of Gomai river just around 50 metres away from Mahavir sculpture in Pandav Leni Complex.
