= Caves of Meghalaya =

Large cave system in India

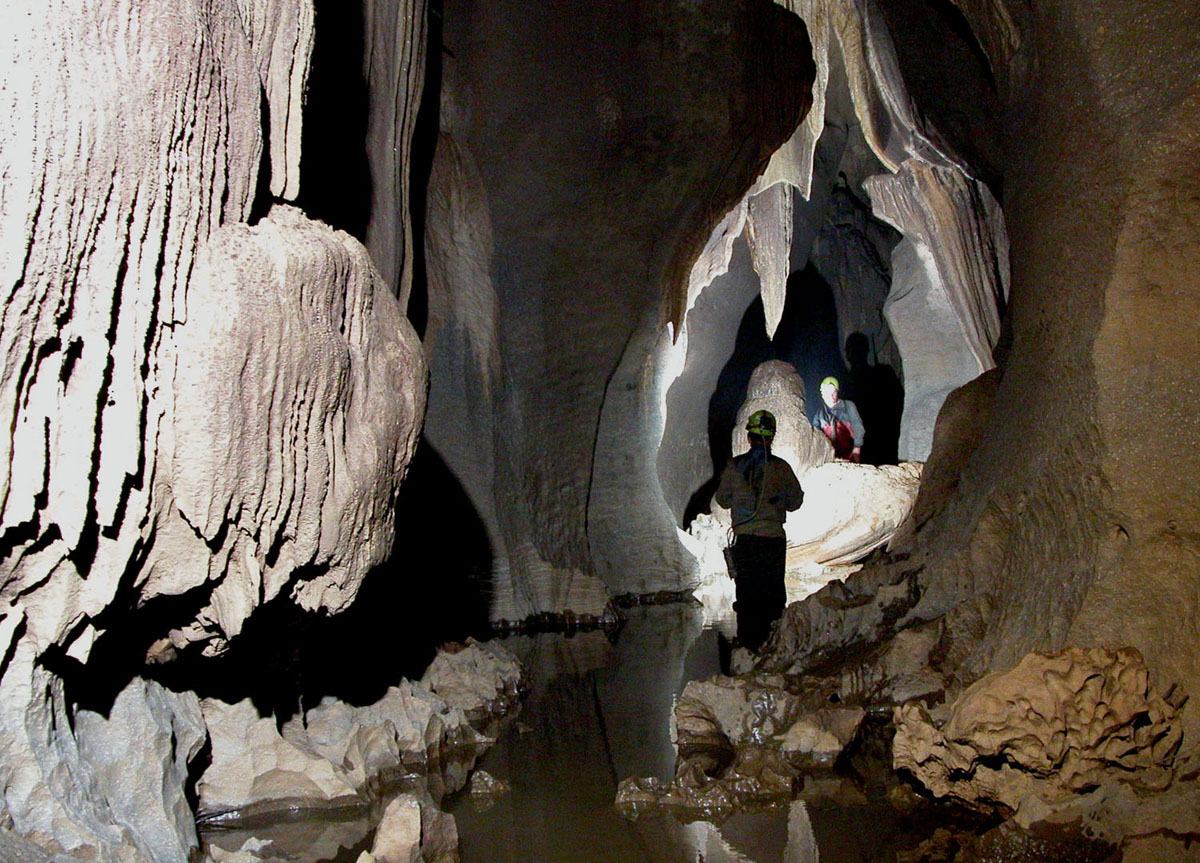
Cave expedition in Meghalaya

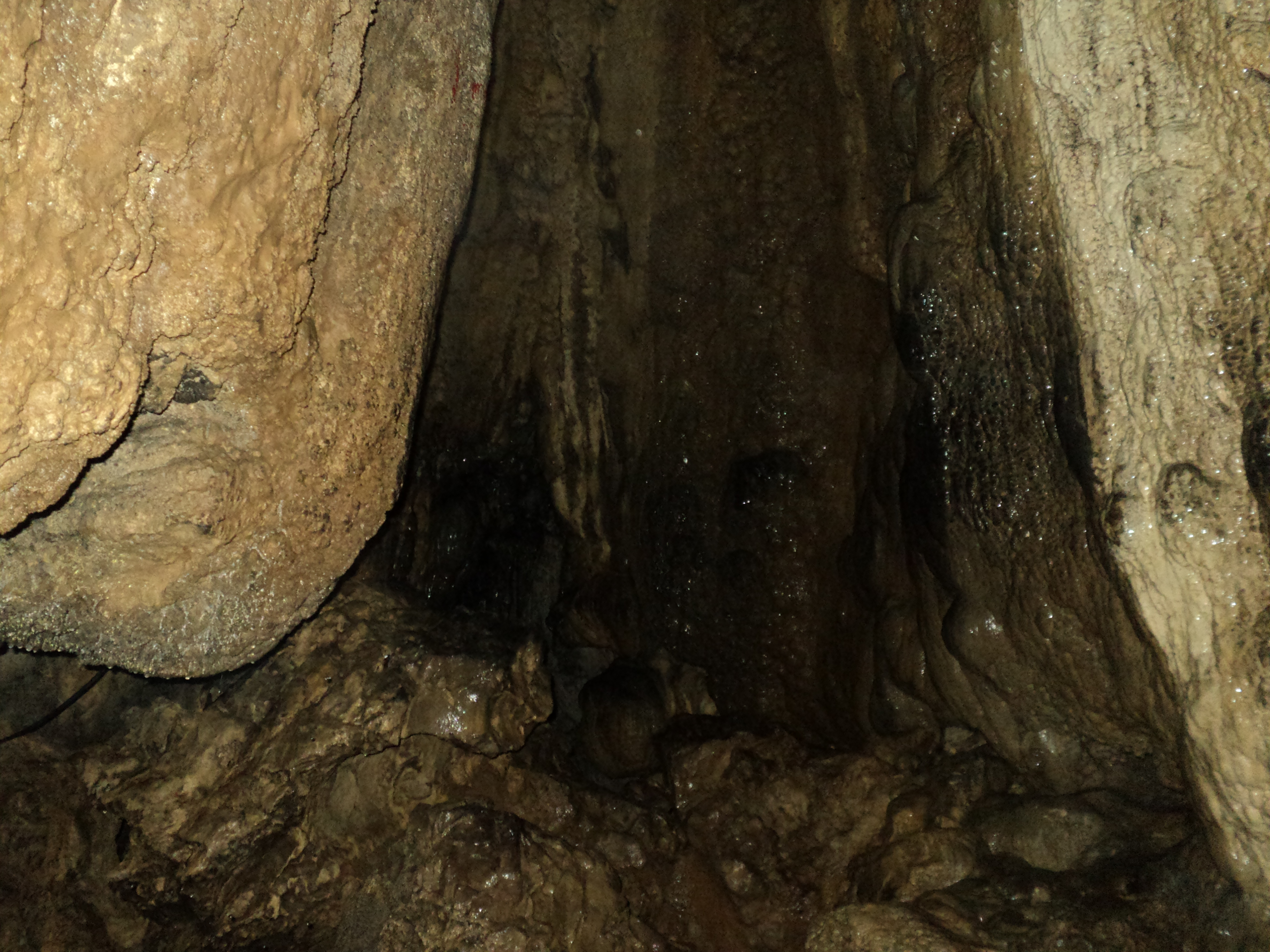
Mawsmai Cave well near Cherrapunji, well cave

The Caves of Meghalaya comprise a large number of caves in the Jaintia, Khasi Hills, and Garo Hills districts in the Indian state of Meghalaya, and are amongst the longest caves in the world. Of the ten longest and deepest caves in India, the first nine are in Meghalaya, while the tenth is in Mizoram. The longest is Krem Liat Prah in the Jaintia Hills, which is 30,957 m (101,600 ft) long. The word "Krem" means cave in the local Khasi language.

The exploration of the Caves of Meghalaya is currently undertaken for both scientific and recreational pursuits,) and there are still many unexplored and partially explored caves in the state. The annual caving expeditions organized by Meghalaya Adventurers Association (MAA) are known as the "Caving in the Abode of the Clouds Project". Because they are located primarily in limestone formations, the caves continue to come under threat from the limestone mining industry.

== History ==
According to the Bengal gazette, Krem Mawmluh was the first cave to be explored by a British subject, Lt. Yule, in 1844. Siju Cave in Garo Hills was studied in 1922 when 1,200 metres (3,900 ft) was explored and four species of cave life forms were identified. After the British Raj period extensive interest has been generated in caving as an adventure sport in the state. Since the 1990s, an exclusive organization known as the Meghalaya Adventurers Association (MAA) (located in Shillong) has been carrying out annual explorations in association with European speleologists, cavers from India, experts from other regions of the world, the Indian Army and the Indian Navy, bringing to light a large number and length of caves in Meghalaya, relative to other known karst regions of the country.

== Numbers and size of caves ==
As of March 2015, 1,580 caves and cave locations have been identified in Meghalaya, of which 980 caves have been fully or partially explored, for a total length of 427 kilometres (265 mi) caves explored. With an explored length of 30,957 metres (101,565 ft), Krem Liat Prah in Jaintia Hills is the longest cave in Meghalaya, as well as India, and is listed among the longest caves in the world. Krem Liat Prah contains a huge passage called the "Aircraft Hangar." Since the MAA was established in 1994, the explored caves account for only about 5% of the total underground passages in the state of Meghalaya.

== Conservation ==
Limestone mining for the cement industry is a major threat to the Caves of Meghalaya, causing a major collapse of the Krem Mawmluh cave, the seventh longest cave in the state of Meghalaya. The "cave-in" stimulated public awareness of the potential threat mining places to the rich scientific, tourism and ecological heritage. Ecologists and speleologists pressured the Government of Meghalaya to take effective steps to stop limestone mining in the vicinity of the limestone caves in the state. During the mid-1990s, a cement plant was planned close to the Siju Cave (called the Bat Cave), near Balphakram National Park in the Garo Hills. This project generated strong opposition from the local community, supported by international scientists, as the cave hosts many rare species of bats. After considerable public pressure was applied, the Ministry of Environment and Forests finally withheld clearance for the project.

== List of twenty longest caves in Meghalaya ==
System	Length	Location	Formation	Remarks
Krem Liat Prah	30,957 m (101,600 ft)	Jaintia Hills	Limestone	In the Shnongrim Ridge. Huge trunk passage called the Aircraft Hangar. Longest cave in the Indian Subcontinent.
Krem KotSati; Kotsati – Umlawan Cave System	21,530 m (70,640 ft)	Jaintia Hills - Lumshnong village	Limestone	24 entrances, both horizontal and vertical. Needs to swim to enter the caves
Krem Tyngheng; Diengjem	21,250 m (69,720 ft)	Jaintia Hills	Limestone	Near Sammasi village. many side passages and very impressive.
Krem Umthloo-Synrang Labbit; Synrang-Pamiang	18,181 m (59,650 ft)	Jaintia Hills - Chiehruphi village, on NH 44	Limestone	Dendritic pattern of stream cave passage. Many entrances. "Titanic Hall" chamber with coloured formations in orange, red, black, grey, blue, green and white.
Krem Chympe; Piel Khlieng Pouk	12,434 m (40,790 ft)	Jaintia Hills - From village Khaddum to Sielkan	Limestone	A river cave. 50 natural dams or gours, 6–8 metres (20–26 ft) high. Large colony of bats.
Krem Shrieh; Tangnub	8,862 m (29,070 ft)	Jaintia Hills - Tangnub village	Limestone	Also known as Very large vertical entrance shaft of 97 metres (318 ft) depth leads to fine stream passage and plethora of high fossil passages.
Krem Tyngheng	8,671 m (28,450 ft)	Jaintia Hills	Limestone	
Krem Mawkhyrdop; Krem Mawmluh	7,194 m (23,600 ft)	Khasi Hills	Limestone	Filled with water needs wading, ceiling is 2.5 feet (0.76 m), formations of stalactite, stalagmite, and rock fossils. Also large number of bats. A speleothem in Mawmluh Cave indicates a dramatic worldwide climate event around 2250 BC, and has been selected by the International Commission on Stratigraphy as the boundary stratotype of the Meghalayan stage/age of the late Holocene.
Krem Lymput; Nongjri	6,641 m (21,790 ft)	Khasi Hills - Nongjri village	Limestone	Attraction is from a small entrance leads to 1 kilometre (0.62 mi) passage called "Way to Heaven," and further to a Mughal Room (more than 25 metres (82 ft) wide, 25 metres (82 ft) high, and 75 metres (246 ft) long).
Krem Rongdangngai Mondil Kol	5,831 m (19,130 ft)	Jaintia Hills	Limestone	
Krem Shyrong Labbit; Shyieng Khlieh	5,715 m (18,750 ft)	Jaintia Hills	Limestone	
Tetengkil Balwakol	5,681 m (18,640 ft)	Garo Hills - Nengkhong village	Limestone	two circular entrances of 1 metre (3 ft 3 in) dia expanding to walking height passages with dendric river flow.
Krem Umsynrang	5,612 m (18,410 ft)	Jaintia Hills	Limestone	
Siju Cave; Siju–Dobhakhol	4,772 m (15,660 ft)	Garo Hills - Siju village	Limestone	It is in the vertical side of the Simsang River. Also known as "bat cave". Has attractive stalagmites and stalactites. It has a Di's chamber. The cave has been extensively researched and is well known.
Krem Risang	4,565 m (14,980 ft)	Jaintia Hills	Limestone	
Krem Synrang Ngap	4,172 m (13,690 ft)	Jaintia Hills	Limestone	Initial reaches consist of calcite bosses to reach a major junction leading to an inlet tunnel converging to a smaller section of passage beyond which are potholed galleries with cave pearl-like sandstone pebbles in the floor
Krem Synrang Labbit	3,933 m (12,900 ft)	Jaintia Hills	Limestone	
Krem Wah Ryngo – Khongrang	3,416 m (11,210 ft)	Jaintia Hills	Limestone	
Krem Iawe	3,398 m (11,150 ft)	Jaintia Hills - Shnongrim-Tangnub Ridge	Limestone	Daylight lit very wide pothole entrance. A number of attractive fossil passages.
Krem Mawshun	3,339 m (10,950 ft)	Khasi Hills - Near Church Lelad	Limestone	Dendritic master river cave. Has many decorated high level passages.

== IUGS geological heritage site ==
In respect of the Krem Mawmluh Cave site being the 'GSSP of the youngest unit of the geologic time scale associated with dramatic climate changes with implications on human civilisation' the International Union of Geological Sciences (IUGS)' included the 'GSSP of the Meghalayan Stage in the Mawmluh Cave' in its assemblage of 100 'geological heritage sites' around the world in a listing published in October 2022. The organisation defines an 'IUGS Geological Heritage Site' as 'a key place with geological elements and/or processes of international scientific relevance, used as a reference, and/or with a substantial contribution to the development of geological sciences through history.'

== See also ==
- Cave research in India

== Bibliography ==
- Daly, Brian D. Kharpran (January 2013). Caves for the Uninitiated. Strategic Book Publishing. ISBN 978-1-61897-470-9.
