= Savalde =

Village in Maharashtra

Savalde Sawalda
- village
- Location in Maharashtra, India Savalde (India)
- Coordinates: 21.5033°N 74.4747°E
- Country: India
- State: Maharashtra
- District: Nandurbar

Population (2007)
  - Total: 889

Languages
  - Official: Marathi
- Time zone: UTC+5:30 (IST)
- PIN: 425409
- Telephone code: 02565
- Vehicle registration: MH 39
- Nearest city: Nandurbar
- Lok Sabha constituency: Nandurbar

Savalde (also spelled as 'Sawalde', 'Sawalda', 'Savalda') is a village in Shahada taluka in Nandurbar district of Maharashtra state in India. Savalde village is situated around 5 km South-west of Shahada, situated on the bank of river Tapti(Tapi) and on state border of states of Maharashtra and Gujarat.

== Village ==
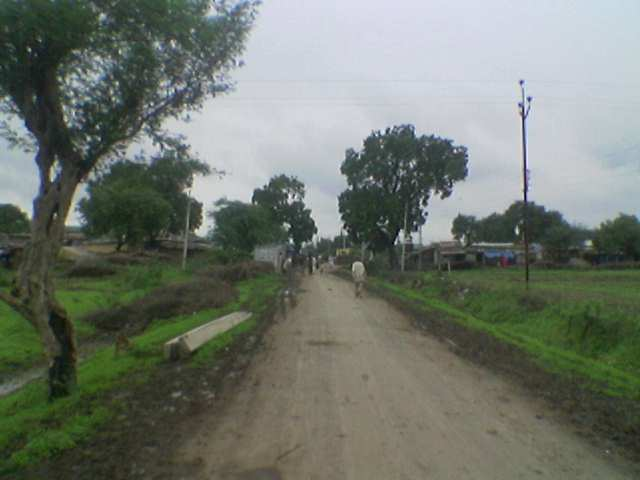
Savalde Village

Savalde village is situated around 5 km away from Nandurbar and around 1 km west from Maharashtra State Highway Number 1 on Shahada-Nandurbar road. It is situated just 1 km away from the official state border between Gujarat and Maharashtra states of India. Many houses in this border village are built on a single mountain on the bank of river Tapti. Occupation of almost all the villagers is farming or related work. For important shopping, health treatment or higher education villagers go to Shahada or Prakasha which are easily accessible by bus, private vehicle or stopping any on route to Shahada passenger riksha on Highway. Fresh vegetables and milk in Shahada town comes from villages like Savalde. It is slowly becoming an important point to enter Maharashtra from Gujarat.

== Seismograph station ==
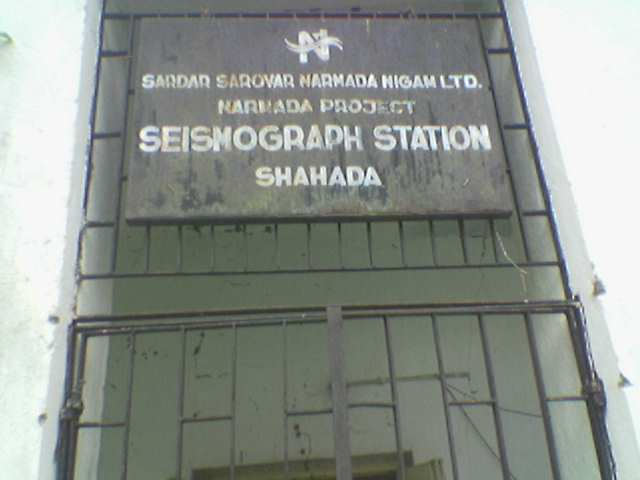
Sardar Sarovar Narmada Nigam Ltd Seismograph Station Office Signboard At Savalde Near Shahada

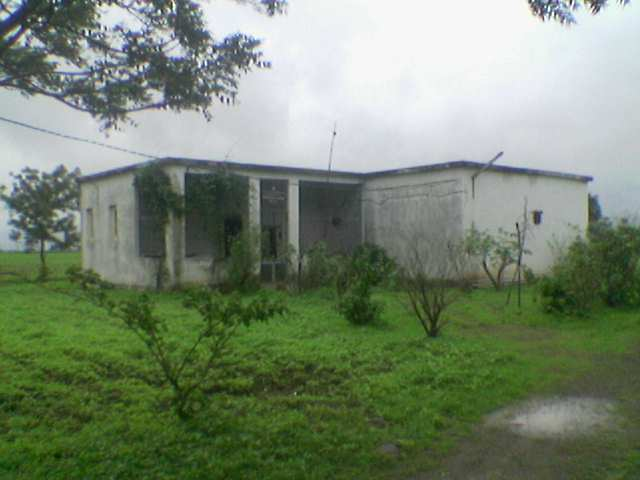
Sardar Sarovar Narmada Nigam Ltd Seismograph Station Office At Savalde Near Shahada

Sardar Sarovar Narmada Nigam Ltd has installed 9 seismograph stations around Sardar Sarovar Dam to monitor any seismic activity due to water in dam. These stations are Alirajpur Badwani Kooksi in Madhya Pradesh, Sagbara Ghabana Jeetgarh Kwant Naswadi in Gujarat and Shahada in Maharashtra. Out of these 9 seismograph stations around Sardar sarovar dam, only two seismograph stations, Shahada and Sagbara, are fully functional. Shahada is one of these 9 Seismograph Stations. As seismograph machines are installed away from ground vehicle traffic, seismograph machine is installed in the west direction of Savalde village, just outside the village. Seismograph station at Savalde was also worn out and was not in working condition until 10 November 2006 Savalde earthquake.

== 10 November 2006 earthquake ==
In the night of 10 November 2006, Savalde villagers reported to Shahada Police Station sounds coming from underground and ground vibrations. After verification, police vans alerted people in Shahada town and nearby villages to remain alert. Nothing happened in the night of 10 November. But in the afternoon of next day, tremors of magnitude 2.8 struck to Shahada tahsil region. No damage done to property or any life anywhere except cracks on the walls of few houses in Savalde village. Scientists from GSDA(Groundwater Surveys and Development Agency) and MERI (Maharashtra Engineering Research Institute) Nasik visited the Savalde village and concluded that underground sounds and tremors occurred because of pressure of weak lithosphere on air pockets in natural or human made cavities inside lithosphere. Due to heavy rain in August 2006, pressure over weak lithosphere mantle increased. Weak lithosphere mantle crashed in this cavity and hence on air inside cavity which caused underground sounds and tremors.
