= Sarangkheda =

Village in Maharashtra

- village
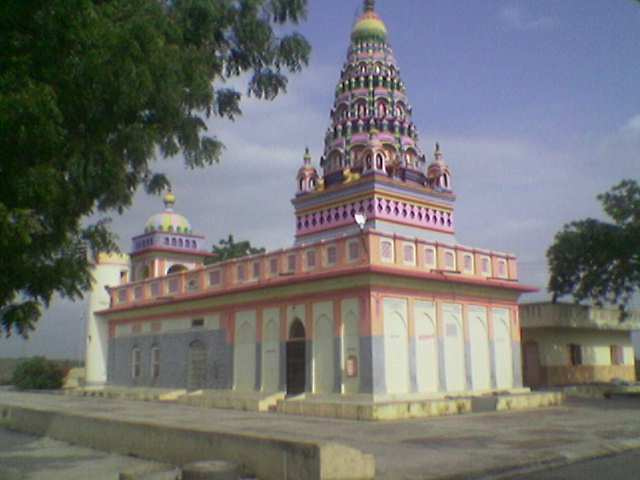
- Datta Mandir, Sarangkheda

- Location in Maharashtra, India Sarangkheda (India)
- Coordinates: 21.433273°N 74.526421°E
- Country: India
- State: Maharashtra
- District: Nandurbar( आदिवासी क्षेत्र)

Population (2007)
  - Total: 8,060

Languages
  - Official: Local tribal languages and Marathi, Gujarati Hindi
- Time zone: UTC+5:30 (IST)
- PIN: 425410
- Vehicle registration: MH 39
- Nearest city: shahada, Nandurbar
- Lok Sabha constituency: Nandurbar

Sarangkheda is a village in Shahada taluka in Nandurbar district of ( satpuda ) Maharashtra state in India. Sarangkheda village is situated around 15 km South of Shahada on the bank of Tapti River.

== Overview ==
Sarangkheda village and towns like Shahada, Nizar, Rajpipla, Taloda, Akkalkuwa, and Dhadgaon in the northern area of Sarangkheda ( satpuda pardesh ) were almost cut off from the rest of Maharashtra until 1957. In 1957, a bridge was built which connected villages and towns in the area north of the Tapti river to the rest of Gujarat Maharashtra.

This Datta Mandir and Rawal Riyasat is almost 200 years old and renovated around 40 years ago. It is believed that the idol of Datta has been brought from Patan in Patan district.

Each year on the occasion of Datta Jayanti, an annual fair is held for around two weeks and main attractions of the fair is the horse bazaar or horse trading. The fair attracts thousands of people all over India and for many purposes like horse riding, farming etc...

Recently a barrage is built just to the east of the bridge to supply water for irrigation and drinking.

The village hosts a Horse trading fair every year in December called 'Sarangkheda Chetak Festival'. This tradition has been going on since recorded in history over 300 years ago. Maharashtra Tourism Development corporation (MTDC) has planned to develop a horse museum for travelers that will inform them about the numerous qualities of breed, marking, lifespan and color etc. of horses. The Government has sanctioned Rs 4.98 crores for the museum and the dome-shaped horse museum will be constructed on 6.5 acres land along the Tapti River. The other amenities like art gallery, exhibition venue, audio-visual room, food stall, shops will be made in the museum.
