= Pandavleni =

Pandav Leni Jain cave
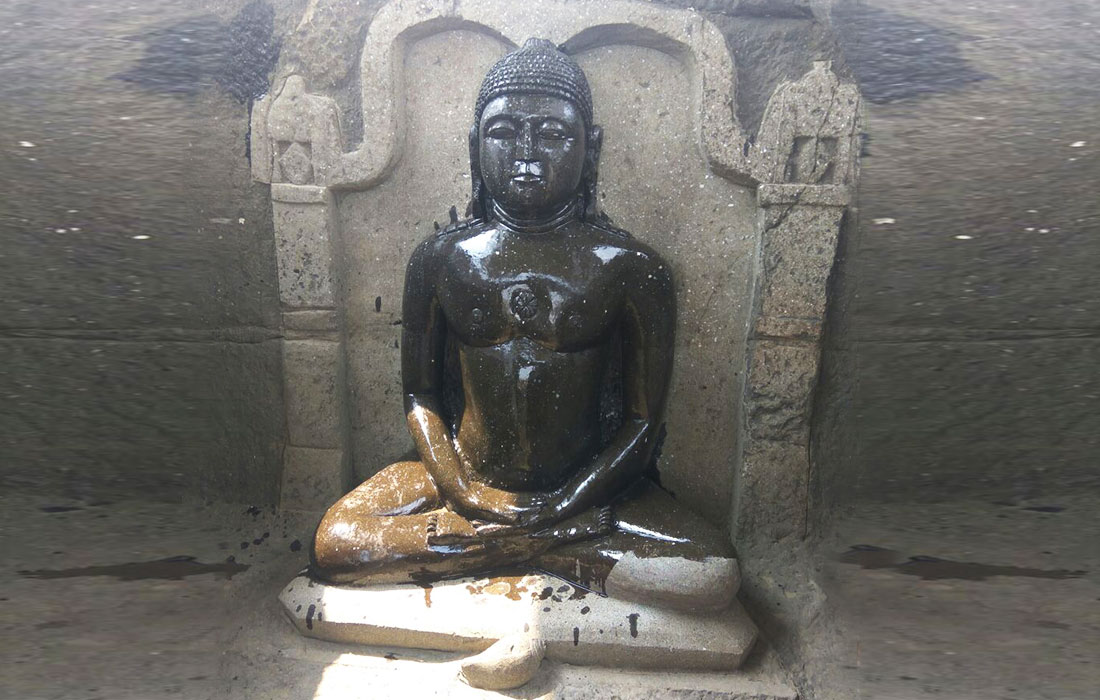
- Neminatha statue at Pandav Leni Jain cave

- Location within India Location within Maharashtra
- 21.586°N 74.495°E
- Location: Shahada, Maharashtra

History
- Built: First century BC to First century AD

Site notes
- Website: www.tirthankarleni.org

Pandavleni, also known as Tirthankar Leni, Panch Pandav or Pandav Leni Jain cave, is ancient rock-cut sculptures complex located at Gomai River around 6 kilometer north of Shahada, Maharashtra. These caves were excavated by Jain saints 2,000 years ago. The site is distinct from the better-known Pandavleni Caves of Nashik, which are a predominantly Buddhist rock-cut complex.

== Location ==
The Pandavleni complex is in the bed of Gomai river carved in one solid rock. The Pandavleni is around 10 metres below the rest of terrain. There are rather identical two structures around 15 metres apart in east-west line. Sculptures in rock are carved in such a way that water in river flows over the rock, water falls in sculpture complex but force of water do not impact sculptures. It is like sculpture carved on the wall of well. During flood well will be filled with water and water will flow over well without causing any damage to sculpture on the wall of the well.

== History ==
The Jain sculptures at Pandavleni have traditionally been assigned to the early historic period. The site has been associated with the period between the first century BCE and the first centuries CE, although the chronology of individual sculptures requires further archaeological investigation.

The sculptures were carved directly into the natural rock formation. The site is significant as evidence for the presence of Jain religious activity in northern Maharashtra during the early historic period.

== Pandavleni Complex A ==
This complex is nearest to centre of bed of Gomai river. There are two rooms. In first small there are five sculptures. Main sculpture room is Mahavir sculpture facing towards east, which is partially destroyed. On the right and left side of Mahavir sculpture there are two sculptures each. This room opens to second big room where there are many sculptures carved on the four walls of the room. Among the figures identified at the site are Neminatha, the 22nd Tirthankara, and Parshvanatha, the 23rd Tirthankara.

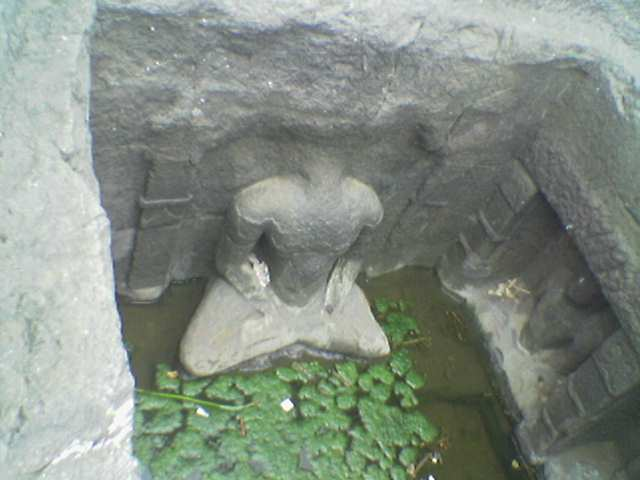
Statues of Jain Tirthankars

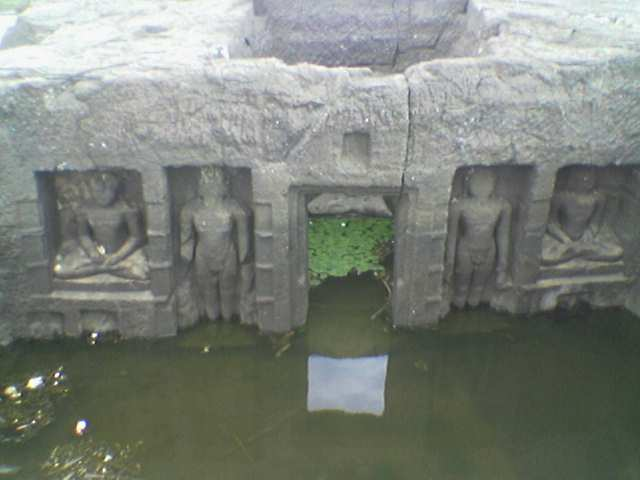
Statues of Jain Tirthankars

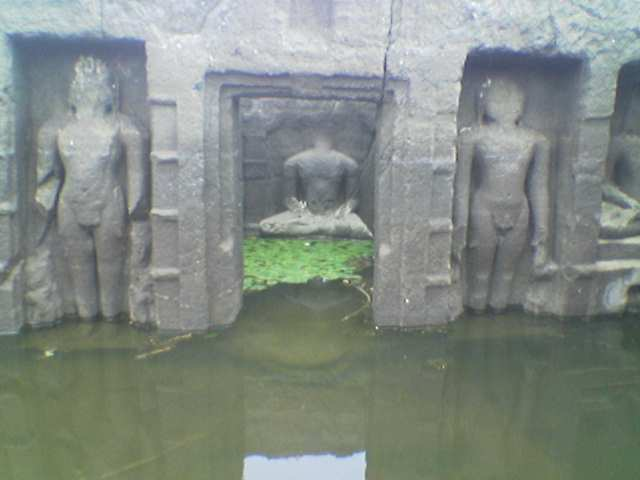
Statues of Jain Tirthankars

== Pandavleni Complex B ==
This complex is around 15 metres in the west from Complex A in the same rock. This complex looks identical like Complex A except that in the first small room there are total seven sculptures, three sculptures each on the right and left side of Mahavir sculpture. This Mahavir sculpture is also facing east.

Sculpture of Jain Tirthankar

Statues of Jain Tirthankars

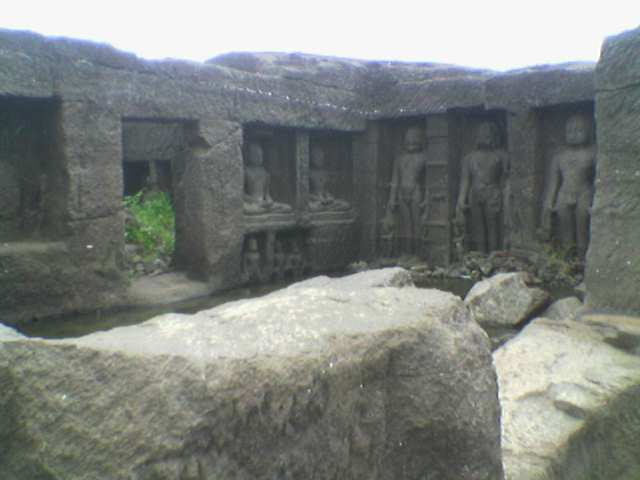
Statues of Jain Tirthankars

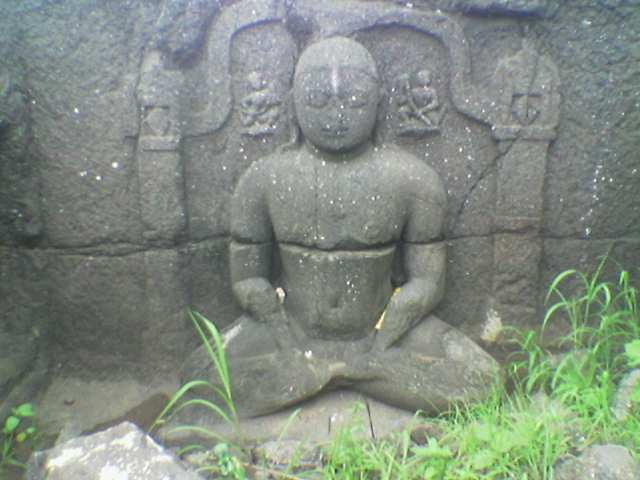
Statues of Jain Tirthankars

== Status ==
Pandavleni caves is protected site under Archaeological Survey of India.

== See also ==
- Pandavleni Caves
- Pale Jain cave
