= Mandvi, Surat district =

Mandvi
- Town
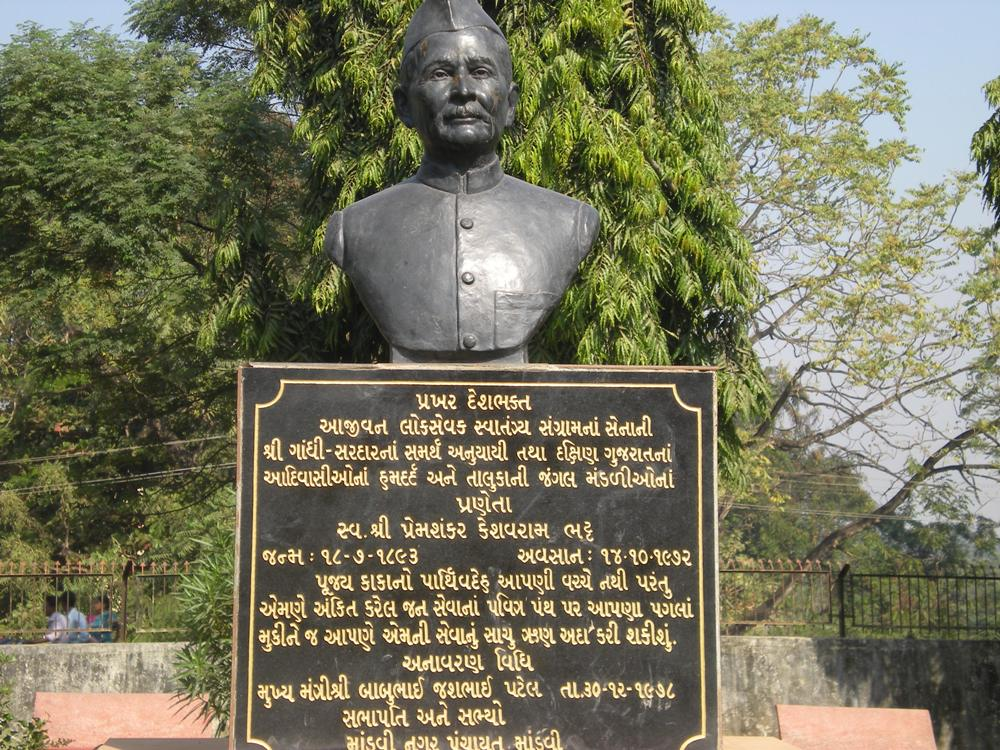
- Premshankar Bhatt
- Nickname: mandapipur
- Location in Gujarat, India Mandvi (India)
- Coordinates: 21.15°N 73.18°E
- Country: India
- State: Gujarat
- District: Surat

Government
  - Body: Nagar Palika
- Elevation: 50 m (160 ft)

Population (2011)
  - Total: 18,214

Languages
  - Official: Gujarati, Hindi
- Time zone: UTC+5:30 (IST)
- PIN: 394160
- Vehicle registration: GJ 19
- Sex ratio: 50.2%♂/49.08%♀
- Website: gujaratindia.com

Mandvi is a port town located in the Mandvi tehsil of Surat District in the Indian state of, Gujarat. It is governed by Mandvi Municipality.

== Geography ==
It lies on the banks of the Tapti River. It is around 61 kilometres (38 mi) east of Surat. It is 113km (aerial distance) from the coast. The town is connected to surrounding towns by roads, and encompasses an area of 7.5km². Three state highways pass through the city. The average annual rain fall is 67 inches.

== Demographics ==
According to the 2011 census, the population of Mandvi was 18,214. The population is primarily Hindu, with smaller percentages of Muslim, Sikh and Christian people.

== History ==
Established in the 1580s, multiple clans arrived in the area, including Brahmins, Visavaria and Gohil.

After independence, Mandvi became part of Bombay State. When Bombay State split, creating Gujarat, this area came under the new state.

== Economy ==
Mandvi is known for its carpentry, blacksmith work and handlooms. Residential land use predominates the inner city. Commercial land use is broadly mixed, with mainly retail shops. The left side of town can be considered developing, while the right side is less developed. Other parts include a slum area, agricultural land, wasteland and a hilly area.

Mandvi hosts two markets: Navi and Juni. , Dahya park society and PN park society are near a bus station. Tribal communities depend heavily on forests and forestry activities.

== Transport ==
The closest airport is in Surat, 56km away. The closest railway stations are: Kim (44km), Madhi (17km), Bardoli (25km) and Surat (56km). Bus service is available.

== Amenities ==
The riverfront offers a garden in front of Tapti River. Jetpur Kevdi is an eco-tourism center. Kevdi is a forest ecotourism site situated on the route connecting Jambughoda Sanctuary and Ratanmahal Sanctuary. It is situated at the bank of a river, 14km from the Kanjeta Eco Campsite. It comes under the Chhota Udaipur forest division. The site is rich in biodiversity, hosting sloth bears, panthers, hyenas, and giant flying squirrels.

== See also ==
- List of tourist attractions in Surat
