= Shahada, Maharashtra =

Shahada (Shahajipur)
- Town
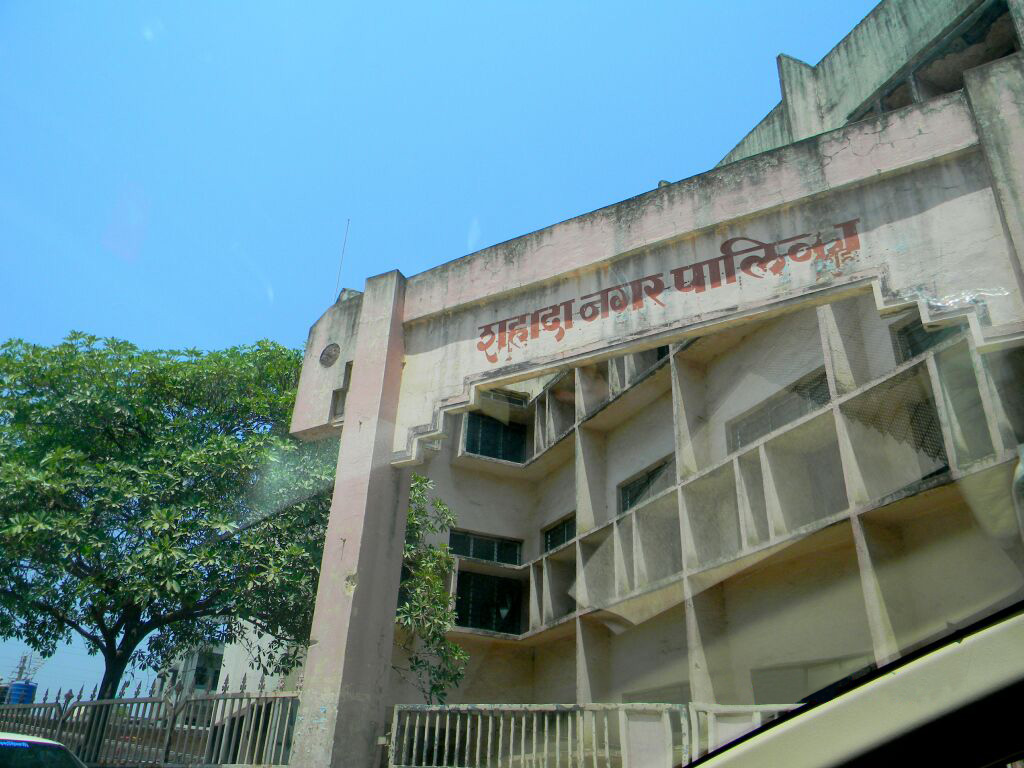
- Shahada Municipality

- Location in Maharashtra, India
- Coordinates: 21.5429691°N 74.4691462°E
- Country: India
- State: Maharashtra
- District: Nandurbar

Area
  - Total: 10.75 km^{2} (4.15 sq mi)
- Elevation: 138 m (453 ft)

Population (2025)
  - Total: 87,000
  - Density: 267/km^{2} (690/sq mi)
- Time zone: UTC+5:30 (IST)
- PIN: 425409
- Telephone code: 91-02565
- Vehicle registration: MH39
- Sex ratio: 954 ♂/♀
- Literacy: 86.62%

Shahada is a town in Nandurbar district of the Indian state of Maharashtra. It is a Municipal council. It is the second biggest town and the biggest Tehsil in Nandurbar district.

== History ==
Under Maharao Jadavrao and Rao Shinde's of Dhanur, Shahada Village became part of West Khandesh in 1500s.

1400s to 1700s Shinde's became Rao of west Khandesh under Jadhavrao Rulers of Khandesh :-

The Shinde/Scindia (Sarpatils) of Khandesh. Who came from Amirgarh (Present in Rajasthan) as Rao of West Khandesh in and 14th century. In past they are Rai Amirgarh and ancestors of Sindh's Royal Family. They control Khandesh from Laling fort and Dhanur & Dhule Towns. In 1600s Jadhavrao lost ruling power against Mughal but after some time later Rao Shinde recaptured Khandesh with the help of Maratha Empire. In end of 1600s they came under Maratha Empire led by Chhatrapati Sambhaji and some years later they lost the Administrative and Ruler power against Mughal Empire led by Aurangzeb in war.

=== Maratha rule ===
Maratha raids into Khandesh began in 1670 with Shinde's Rao of West Khandesh and the following century was a period of unrest as Mughals and Marathas competed for control. In 1760, the Peshwa ousted the Mughal ruler and gained control of Khandesh, following which portions were granted to Holkar and Shinde/Scindia rulers. Baji Rao II surrendered to the British in June 1818, but sporadic war continued in Khandesh which was among the last of the Peshwa's former territories to come under complete British control.

Prakasha village, which is around 15 km south-west of Shahada, is the second most important excavation site in Maharashtra. In 1955 B K Thapar on behalf of Archaeological Survey of India excavated site near confluence of Tapi River and Gomai River. Excavation exposed 17 meter deep occupational deposit – hammer stones, restricted use of copper, low grade bronze dating back to 1700 BC. Around 6 km north of Shahada there are several centuries old sculptures complex in Gomai River. The main sculpture is popularly known as Mahavir sculpture and the entire sculptures complex is popularly known as Pandavleni or 'Panch Pandav'. This evidence suggest that Shahada and area on the banks of Gomai River has been inhabited at least since 1700 BC. Shahada- municipality was established in the British period, in the year 1869. Shahada and bhada are the two locations of this area situated on the river bank Gomai.These names observed in local gurjar language meaning saadha bhada means simple. Pujya Sane Guruji Vidya prasarak mandal collage Lonkheda is the biggest educational campus near Shahada. Municipal school in Shahada is the oldest school since British Raj.

== Demographics ==
As of 2011 India census, Shahada had a population of 61,376, being 52% male and 48% female. Shahada has an average literacy rate of 86.62%, higher than the national average of 74.04%: male literacy is 90.67%, and female literacy is 82.40%. In Shahada, 12.95% of the population is under 6 years of age. Languages/dialects spoken in Shahada town and Nandurbar districts are many tribal language bhilu (ladshi, dogari, bayadi, pwari etc....) And But in Shahada City and nearby area Most spoken language is Marathi & it's dialects like Ahirani, Bhili around more than 50-60% population, Second most spoken Language is Gujarati (Gujari) around 20-30%, Other language like Hindi, Urdu speakers are their in good numbers.

Year	Male	Female	Total Population	Change	Religion (%)							
Year	Male	Female	Total Population	Change	Hindu	Muslim	Christian	Sikhs	Buddhist	Jain	Other religions and persuasions	Religion not stated
2001	25751	23945	49696	–	63.605	32.836	0.586	0.054	0.652	2.205	0.042	0.020
2011	31414	29962	61376	0.235	60.766	35.553	0.562	0.075	0.784	2.187	0.003	0.070

=== Culture and Heritage ===
The local culture of Shahada is significantly influenced by the Gujar (Leva Gujar / Patidar) community, who speak the regional Gujari dialect. The town's traditional domestic lifestyle and culinary heritage feature unique Khandeshi delicacies such as Dal Ladoo (also known locally as Daraba Ladoo or Dalache Ladoo), Chholano Lot, Sanjori, and Landage. In recent years, local cultural preservation initiatives—including digital channels such as Gujar Randhak—have focused on documenting authentic Leva Gujar recipes, traditional cooking techniques, and regional folklore in the native Gujari language spoken across the Shahada and Nandurbar belt.

== Geography and climate ==
Sculpture in Gomai River of a Jain Tirthankar

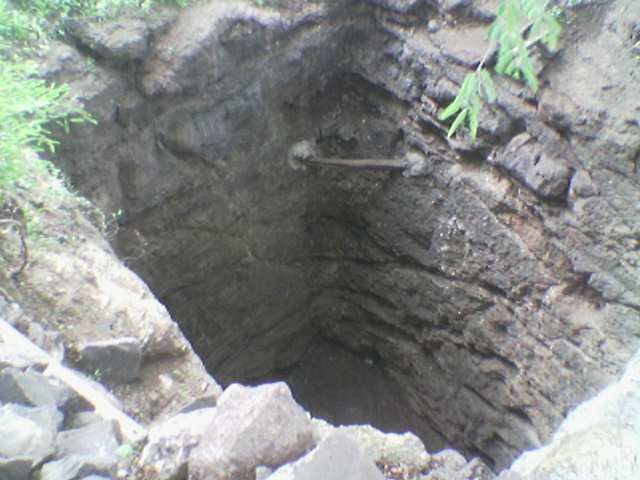
Dry well showing rock 2 to 3 metres below surface of farms around Shahada town

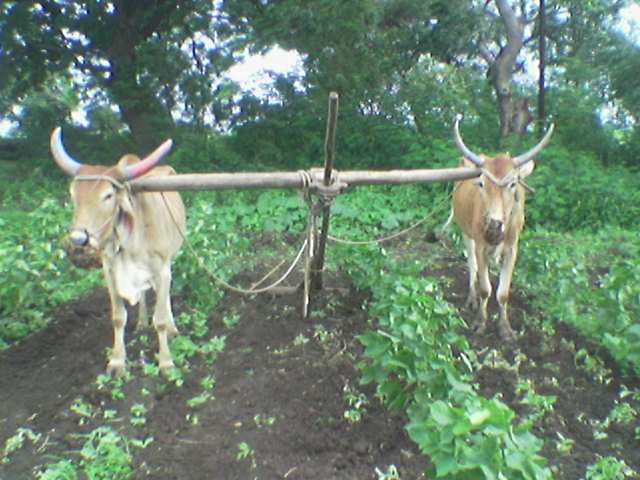
Black soil in farm near Shahada 2 to 3 metres above rock

Shahada is on average 455 feet above sea level. As the Satpura Mountain Range just 30 km north of Shahada, the bedrock is on an average 5 metres below the ground level. Due to natural or human-made caves, the ground at Savalde village, 5 km away from Shahada, caved in during heavy rain during August 2006 and caused an earthquake of magnitude 2.8 on Richter Scale on 10 November 2006. As seismograph stations are installed away from traffic to avoid false-positive results from ground vibrations, Shahada's seismograph station of the Sardar Sarovar Project is installed in the same village.

The soil above the bedrock is good for farming except in some areas. Average rainfall is 552 mm = 21.7 inches. The climate is hot for most of the year. Maximum temperature reaches up to 48 °C in summer and minimum temperature fall up to 9 °C in the winter. The climate of Shahada is on the whole dry except during the south-west monsoon season and winter months December to February. The year may be divided into four seasons. The cold season from December to February. Hot and dry season from March to June. The south-west monsoon season starts from the last week of June and last up to the end of September.

== Medical Facilities ==
- More than 50 hospitals facilities are there in shahada.

== Transport ==
As Ankleshwar-Burhanpur Highway passes through Shahada, it is well connected with state transport buses & private buses.

1. Pune to Shahada. From INR 500. 18 bus options.
2. Vadodara to Shahada. From INR 245. 7 bus options.
3. Mumbai to Shahada. From INR 577. 10 bus options.
4. Ahmedabad to Shahada. From INR 333. 4 bus options.
5. Panvel to Shahada. From INR 577. 3 bus options.

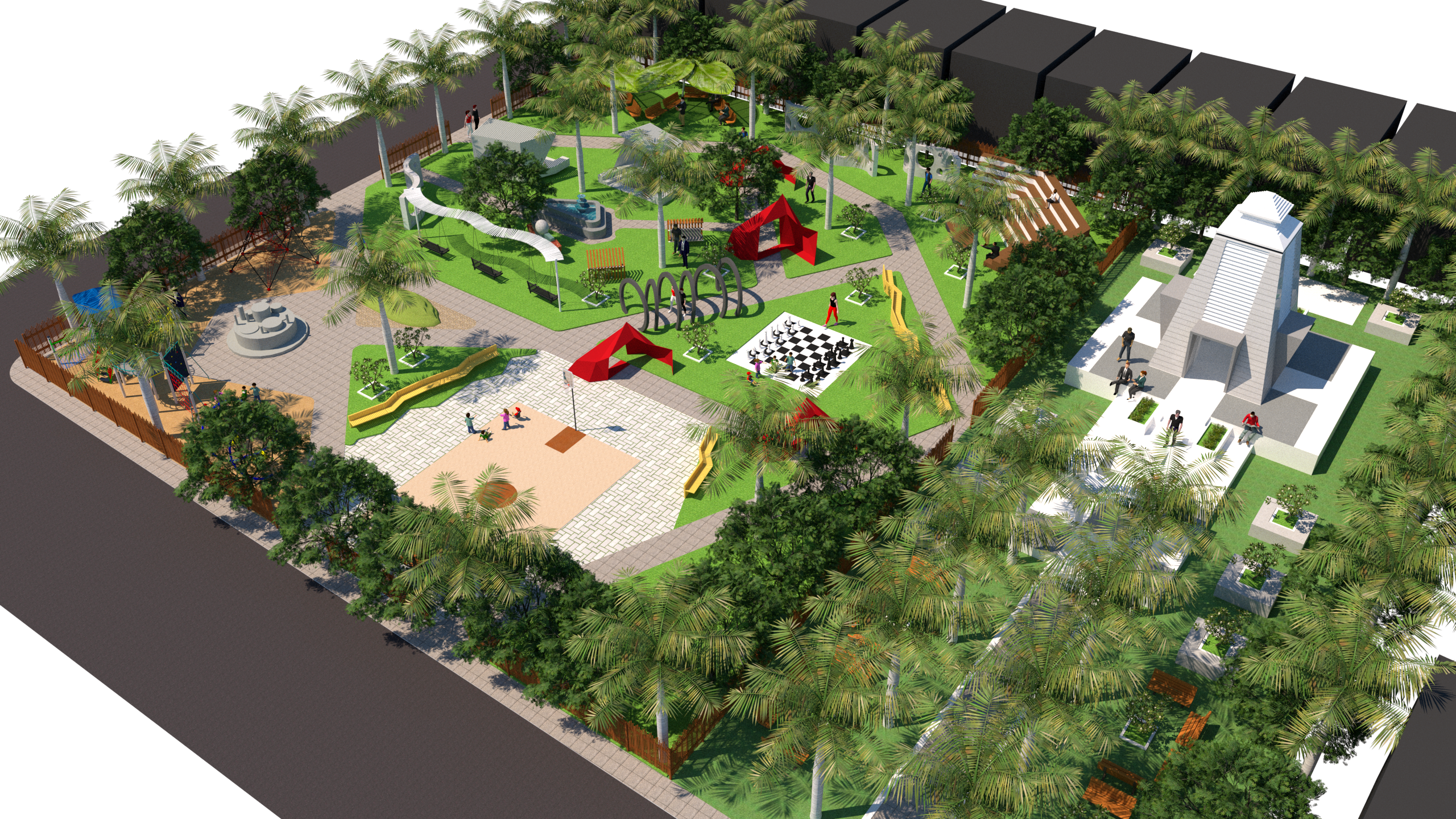
Asia's First Golden ratio based Meditation Center at Chorriya Town. Shahada, Nandurbar

- Road: One can reach Shahada through Indore (84 km away), which is well connected with the Dhule–Nandurbar road. From Dhule, one can reach Shahada by going straight on the Mumbai-Agra highway NH-3 (National Highway) to Songir (Dhule) and at Songir turn left and you will be on MSH-1 (Maharashtra State Highway). The distance from Mumbai is approximately 424 km.
- Railways: The nearest railway stations are Dondaicha (c. 28.6 km away) and Nandurbar (c. 35.6 km away). These stations are on Bhusawal-Surat Railway line. This line is used by people for going to or coming from Gujarat

== Tourist attractions ==
- Toranmal is nearby hill station.( Second number hill station after mahabaleshwar in Maharashtra state)
- Unapdev is (24.9 km) from Shahada) is a picnic point in Shahada. *【【Shivtirth 】】is best point at shahada
- Prakasha is a spiritually bounded village and a holy place to visit. It is also known as Dakshin Kashi
