= Unapdev =

Coordinates: 21.73°N 74.4414°E

location of Unapdev in Maharashtra

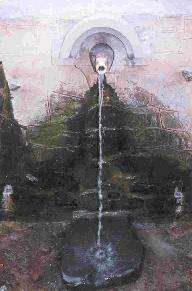
Hot water spring in Unapdev

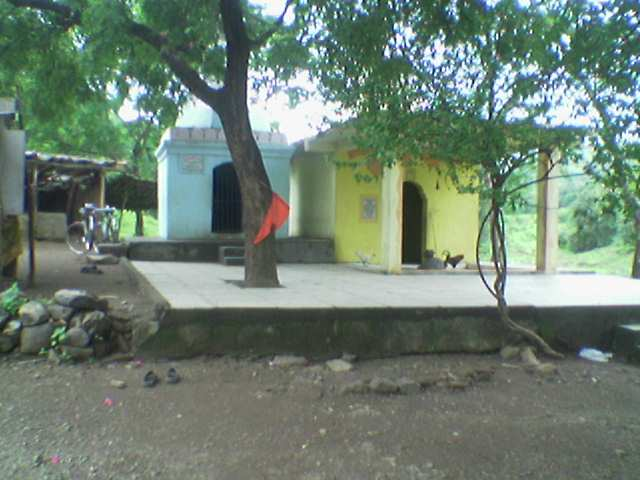
A mandir near the hot water spring

Unapdev is a hill station in the town of Shahada, Maharashtra located near the village of Dara.

The picnic point has a permanent natural hot water source. Water from the spring flows from a structure in the shape of a cow's mouth.
