= Prakasha =

Village in Maharashtra

- village
- Nickname: Dakshin Kashi
- Location in Maharashtra, India Prakasha (India)
- Coordinates: 21°31′0″N 74°19′0″E
- Taluka: Shahada
- State: Maharashtra
- District: Nandurbar

Government
  - Type: Gram Panchayat
- Elevation: 117 m (384 ft)

Population
  - Total: 8,000

Language
  - Official: Marathi
- Time zone: UTC+5:30 (IST)
- PIN: 425 422
- Vehicle registration: MH-39
- Coastline: 0 kilometres (0 mi)
- Nearest city: Shahada, Maharashtra
- Literacy: 50%
- Climate: 35-40 (Köppen)
- Avg. summer temperature: 40 °C (104 °F)
- Avg. winter temperature: 10 °C (50 °F)

Prakasha, popularly known as Dakshin Kashi is a village on the bank of Tapi River in taluka Shahada in Nandurbar district, Maharashtra, India.

== Demographics ==
Prakasha has a population of around 20,000, of which 90% is in agriculture and 10% in small business. Prakasha is a spiritually bounded village and a holy place to visit. It has 108 shiv temples and more another temples around the village. Among which the most visited temple is Kedareshwar and sangameshwar temple (triveni sangam).

Prakasha is also known for its Dhawaj Parvani, which comes after every 12 years and held on the banks of the Gomai river. This event is visited by lakhs of devotees.

== Economy ==
Most of the population in the village is dependent upon agriculture and allied fields. The crops cultivated here include Wheat, Cotton, Sugarcane, Sunflower, Jowar, Bajra, Toor dal, Chickpea, Amaranth, Banana, Water melon, Musk melon, Sesame, Castor Oil Plant etc.

== Places of interest ==
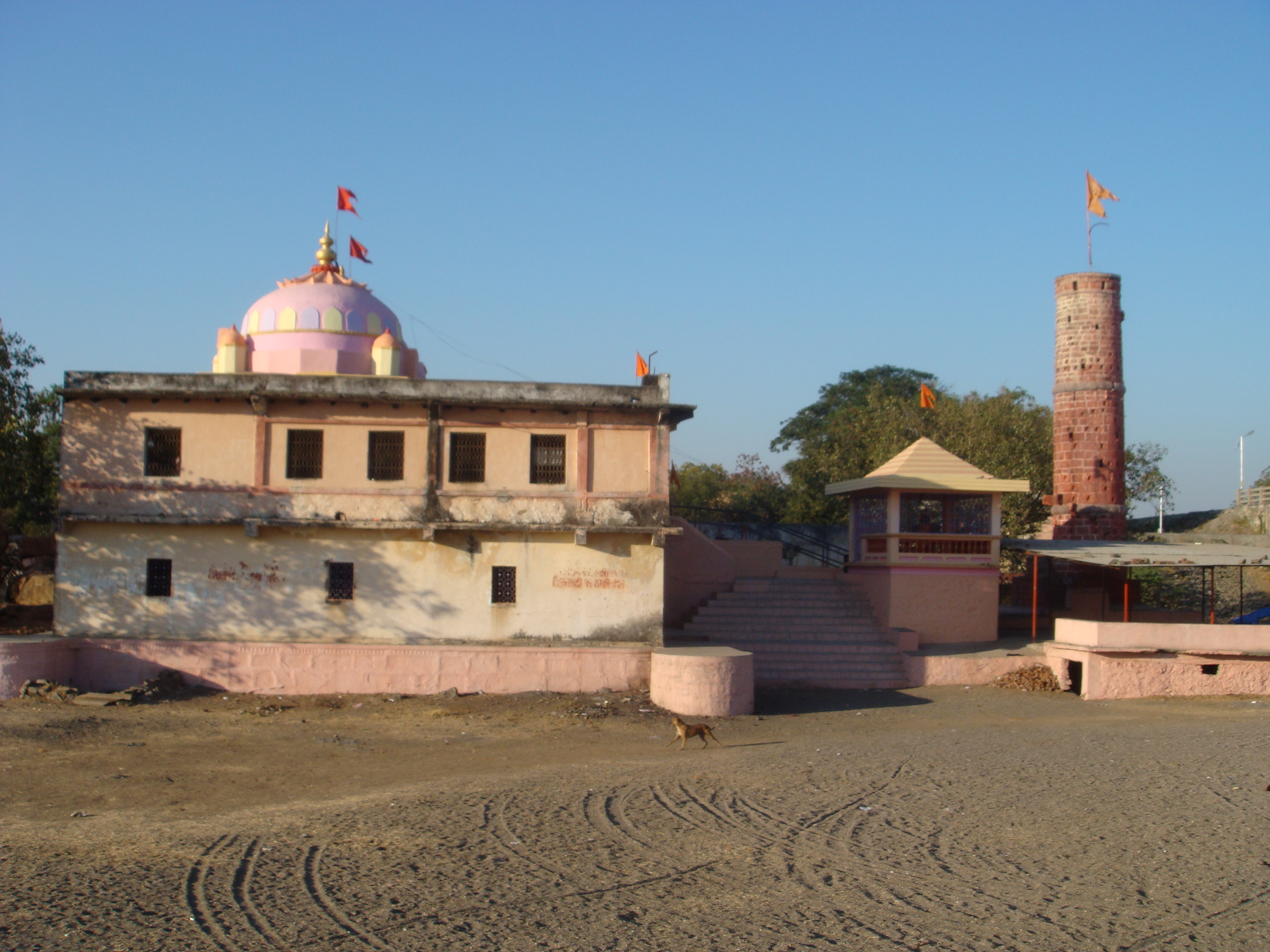
Kedareshwar temple

Prakasha is a famous religious place and is popularly known as Dakshin Kashi. Prakasha is one of the fastest developing place in nandurbar district because of its location on state highway and has all facilities around the village including petrol station, civil hospital, junior college and school, and also some small scale industries. The village is frequently flooded during the rainy season but the temple suffers from no damage despite its proximity to the river. The village turns into an island during floods as it is located at the junction of 2 rivers which cutoff the roads leading to village from both the sides.

Gautameshwar Temple

To the east of the village, on the banks of the Gomai river which downstream unites with the Tapi, is the antique shrine of Gautameshvar Mahadev, said to have been built by one of the Holkars probably Rani Ahilyabai Holkar who is known to have built many temple all over Maharashtra. The whole edifice is 12.80 metres X 4.88 metres (42 ft. X 16 ft.) and stands on an elevated dais with flights of steps on three sides of it giving access to the twelve pillared mandap, two of which are embedded in the gabhara walls. These pillars in all form eleven arches on the three open sides of the mandap. On the upper most step of the frontal flight of stairs one comes across two large ling symbols, installed on cement platforms flanking a crudely shaped image of nandi which faces the ling inside the vestibule . The door frame of the vestibule containing the ling of Gautameshvar Mahadev bears some insignificant carvings. On its lintel a few images are also sculptured. A shikhar adorns the top of the gubhara. Though virtually uncared for in recent years, the masonry structure of the temple is still in a solid condition. Outside an images of Hanuman could be seen installed on a pedestal and mother image of deity kept leaning against the trunk of a pipaltree. Every twelve years on the entrance of the, planet jupiter, Guru, in the constellation of the Leo, Simhasta, a fair is held in honour of this Mahadev.

== Prakasha Barrage Dam ==
On 10 Jan 2008 Soma Enterprise completed Prakasha Barrage Project at Prakasha Tal. Shahada, Dist. Nandurbar, Maharashtra, awarded to it by the TIDC (Tapi Irrigation Development Corporation). The scope of work for the Rs. 1.65 billion project included construction of barrage of total length of 1443 m, providing & erecting 27 Vertical Lift Type Mild Steel Gates of size 15m x 9m, having steel component of 5700 MT. The Reservoir Capacity is 2.24TMC and would provide irrigation to 8856 Ha of land.

== History ==
Under Maharao Jadavrao and Rao Shinde's of Dhanur, Prakasha Village became part of West Khandesh in 1500s.

1400s to 1700s Shinde's became Rao of west Khandesh under Jadhavrao Rulers of Khandesh :-

The Shinde/Scindia (Sarpatils) of Khandesh. Who came from Amirgarh (Present in Rajasthan) as Rao of West Khandesh in and 14th century. In past they are Rai Amirgarh and ancestors of Sindh's Royal Family. They control Khandesh from Laling fort and Dhanur & Dhule Towns. In 1600s Jadhavrao lost ruling power against Mughal but after some time later Rao Shinde recaptured Khandesh with the help of Maratha Empire. In end of 1600s they came under Maratha Empire led by Chhatrapati Sambhaji and after some year later they lost the Administrative and Ruler power against Mughal Empire led by Aurangzeb in war.

=== Maratha rule ===
Maratha raids into Khandesh began in 1670 with Shinde's Rao of West Khandesh and the following century was a period of unrest as Mughals and Marathas competed for control. In 1760, the Peshwa ousted the Mughal ruler and gained control of Khandesh, following which portions were granted to Holkar and Scindia rulers. Baji Rao II surrendered to the British in June 1818, but sporadic war continued in Khandesh which was among the last of the Peshwa's former territories to come under complete British control.

In 1955, an excavation was carried out at this site by an Archaeological Survey of India team under the direction of B.K. Thapar. The excavation revealed a more than 17 m deep occupational deposit, belonging to four periods with a break between the earlier two and a continuous sequence thereafter. The periods of occupation are:

On the confluence of the rivers Tapti and Gomai in Shahada Taluka, the site located to the s.-e. of the present village, with its longer axis running along the Gomai. An excavation was undertaken at this site by B.K. Thapar on behalf of the ASI in 1955. (AI, 20 and 21, 1964 and 1965, pp. 5–167).

Period I (c. 1700-1300 B.C.) is Chalcolithic in its cultural content and is further divided into Sub-Periods IA and IB, the former being characterized by the occurrence of blades and microliths, hammer-stones, a restricted use of copper or low-grade bronze, and four ceramic industries.

Sub-Period I B is distinguished by the intrusion of two more ceramic industries, viz. the black-painted red pottery of the Jorwe fabric and the Lustrous Red Ware. The other industries and crafts of the previous Sub-Period continue throughout the occupation. Period II (c. 700-100 B.C. with a margin on the earlier side), following after a time-gap, heralds the Iron Age, Stone implements like blades and microliths are replaced by tools of iron. The use of copper also becomes more common, though remaining subordinate to that of iron.

Period III (Middle of the 2nd century B.C. to the end of the 6th century A.D.), which in its earlier levels overlaps with Period II and in the later levels with Period IV, does not introduce any revolutionary change. The characteristic ceramic industries of the preceding Period go into disuse and are replaced by a nondescript poorly made red ware.

From a comparative study of the past flora and the present vegetation it may be concluded that the cover was forest, if the region on the whole has remained more or less of the same type. Taking these factors into consideration, it would be reasonable to infer that the climate and rainfall in the Khandesh region have not changed to any appreciable extent during the past 3500 years or so.
