= Siju Cave =

Cave in North East India

Siju Cave (Siju Dobakkol)
- Bat Cave
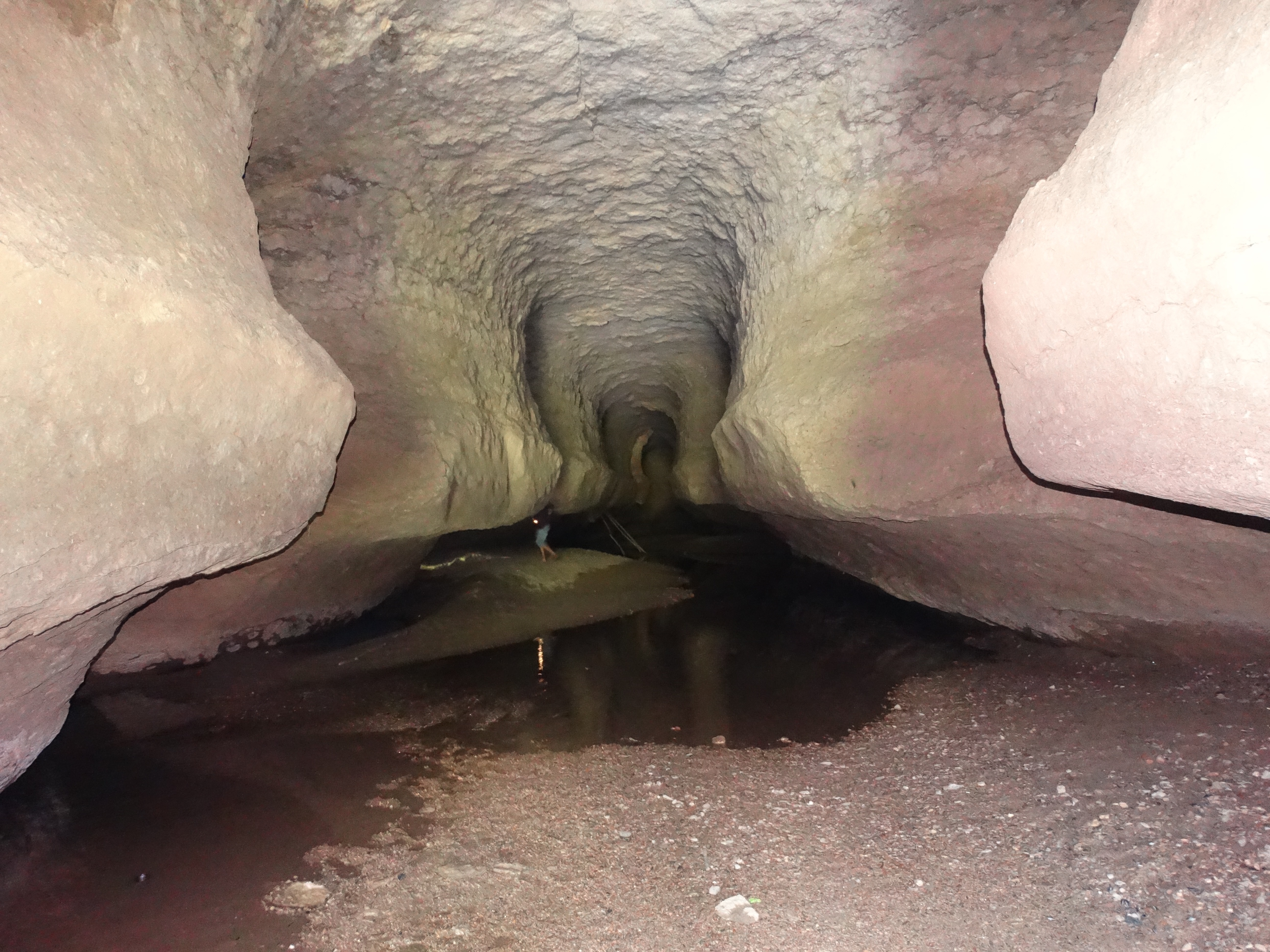
- Inside view of Siju Cave
- Location: Meghalaya, India
- Length: 4,772 m
- Discovery: Known since ancient times, first scientifically explored in 1922
- Geology: Limestone
- Access: Restricted
- Features: Stalactites, Stalagmites

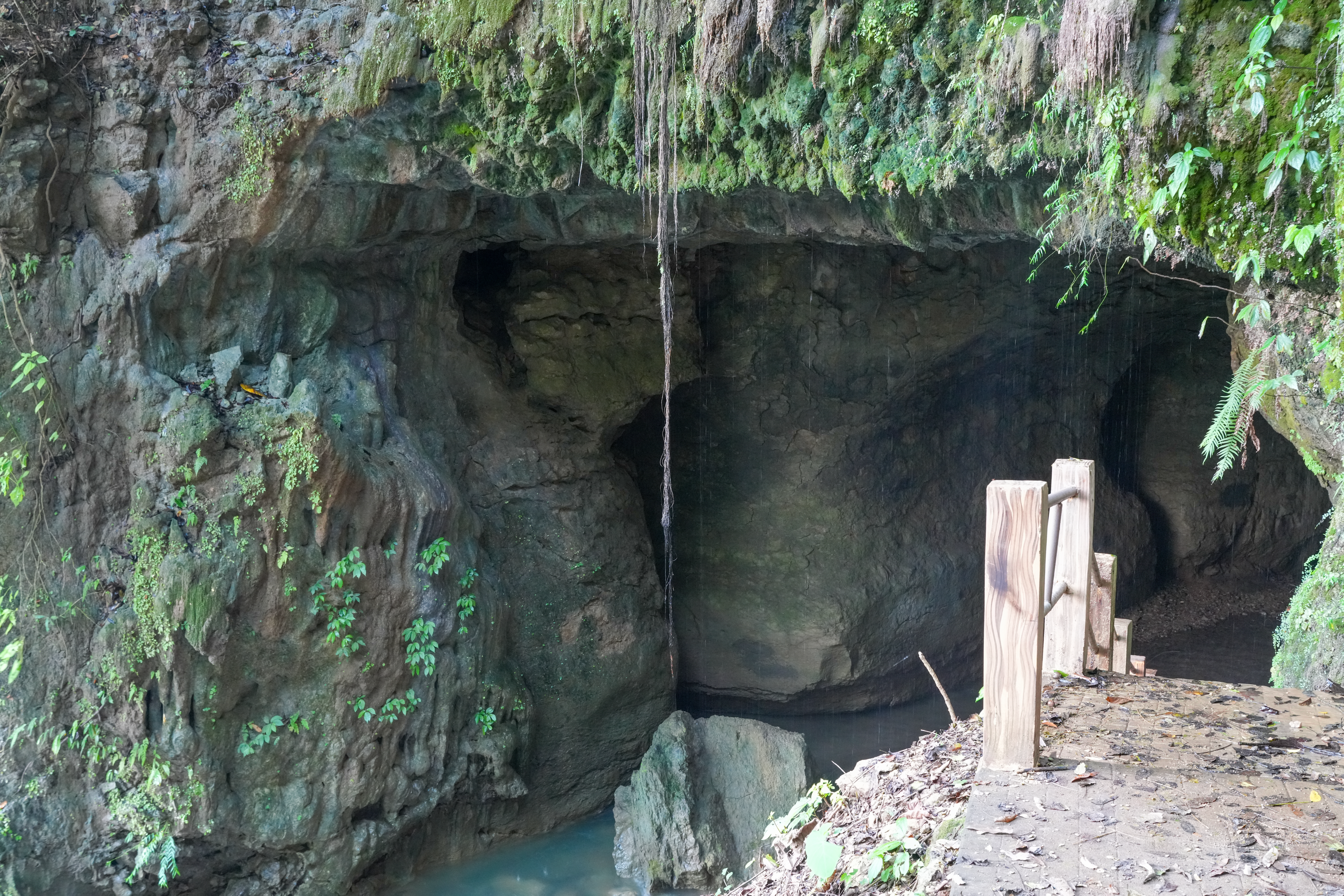
Entrance with steps leading in

Siju Dobakkol, also known as Siju Cave or Bat Cave in English, is one of the most well-known and significant caves in India. Located in the Garo Hills of the North East Indian state of Meghalaya, near Napak Lake and the Simsang River game reserve, it is a renowned limestone cave famous for its impressive stalagmite and stalactite formations. Siju Dobakkol is home to tens of thousands of bats, and holds great significance in the field of biospeleology, being one of the most thoroughly researched caves in the Indian subcontinent.

== History and exploration ==
Although known since ancient times, the scientific exploration of Siju Cave dates back to 1922, when it was investigated by Stanley Kemp and K. Chopra of the Imperial Museum of Calcutta, Calcutta (now Kolkata), as part of an interdisciplinary research project. This project made Siju Cave one of the best-researched cave systems in the Indian subcontinent at the time.

In 1927 it was recorded that the temperature in the cave remains relatively constant throughout the year, ranging between 21–26.4 °C (69.8–79.5 °F). Until 1981, Siju Cave held the record for being the longest cave in India, with a length of 1,200 m (3,900 ft). However, with further explorations, the cave's surveyed length has now been extended to 4,772 m (15,656 ft), making it the 14th longest cave in India today.

== Geography and geology ==
The Siju cave system is over 4.7 km (2.9 mi) long, although nearly all of it is filled with water and remains inaccessible to most visitors. The limestone hills of Meghalaya, known for receiving heavy rainfall and moisture, host many other cave systems, some of which are much longer and larger than Siju Cave. Despite this, Siju Cave remains one of the most thoroughly researched and explored systems in the region.

== Biodiversity and fauna ==
Siju Cave is known for its unique biodiversity, hosting a range of species, particularly from the Arachnida (spiders and their relatives) and Insecta classes. Some of the key species identified in the cave include:

- Arachnida: Opilionida, Schizomida
- Myriapoda: Diplopoda (millipedes), Decapoda Natantia (swimming crabs)
- Crustacea: Isopoda Oniscidea (woodlice)
- Collembola: Entomobryomorpha (springtails)
- Insecta: Orthoptera (grasshoppers and crickets)

The cave is also home to some rare bat species, making it an important site for bat research and conservation.

== See also ==
- Caves of Meghalaya
