= Gomai River =

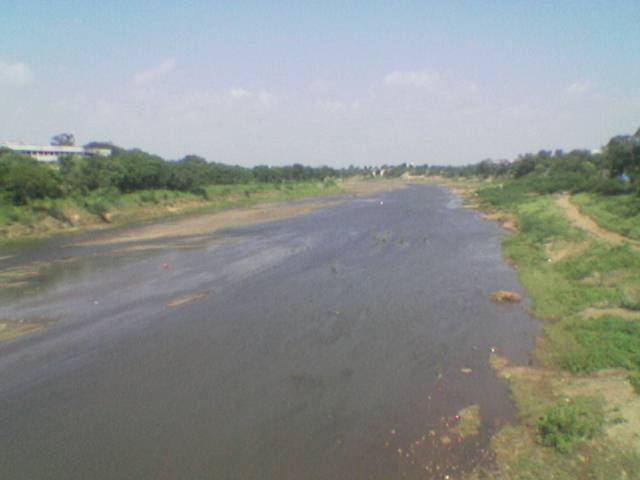

Location
- Country: India
- State: Maharashtra
- Cities: Niwali, Pansemal, Shahada, Sarangkheda

Physical characteristics
- Source: Niwali Tehsil, Barwani District (Madhya Pradesh)
  - location: Satpura Range, India
- Mouth: Tapti River
  - location: Prakasha, India
- Length: 90 km (56 mi)approx

The Gomai River in India is a right-bank tributary of the Tapti River. It originates in the Satpura Mountain Range and merges with the Tapti River around 2 km east of Prakasha. The Gomai River itself has many small tributary rivers, including the Susri River (passing by Sultanpur), the Tipria River (passing by Mandane), the Umri River, and the Sukhi River.

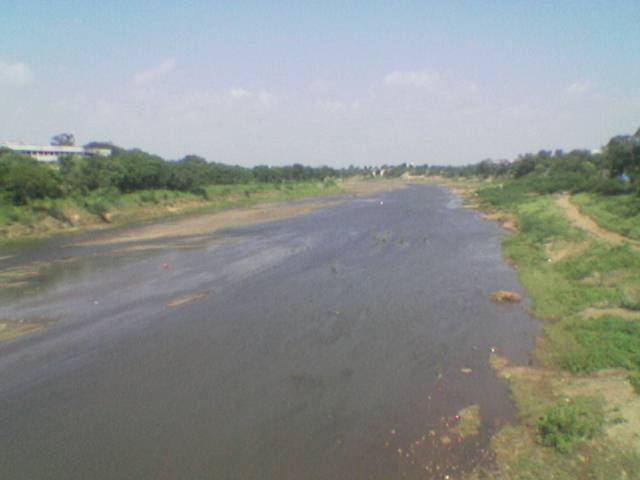
Picture of Gomai River in Shahada taken from bridge located at 21.569°N 74.483°E

== See also ==
- List of rivers of India
- Rivers of India
