= Krem Liat Prah =

Cave in Meghalaya, India

Krem Liat Prah is the longest natural cave in South Asia. It is also known as the Cave of the Tiger.

Prah (Krem is the Khasi word for "cave") is one of approximately 150 known caves in the Shnongrim Ridge of the East Jaintia Hills district in the state of Meghalaya, northeast India. Explored and surveyed as part of the ongoing Abode of the Clouds Expedition project, its current length of about 34 kilometers will likely be increased as nearby caves continue to be connected. Liat Prah's dominant feature is its enormous trunk passage, the Aircraft Hangar.
