= Mawmluh Cave =

Cave in India

- Interactive map of Mawmluh Cave

Mawmluh Cave (Khasi: Krem Mawmluh) is a maze cave in the state of Meghalaya in northeast India. At 7.2 km in length, it is the fourth longest cave in the Indian subcontinent. The cave, which has several entrances, has formed at the junction between an early Eocene dolomite and a sandstone formation. It contains numerous stalactites, stalagmites, columns and drapes, collectively termed speleothems.

In respect of this site being the 'GSSP of the youngest unit of the geologic time scale associated with dramatic climate changes with implications on human civilisation' the International Union of Geological Sciences (IUGS)' included the 'GSSP of the Meghalayan Stage in the Mawmluh Cave' in its assemblage of 100 'geological heritage sites' around the world in a listing published in October 2022. The organisation defines an 'IUGS Geological Heritage Site' as 'a key place with geological elements and/or processes of international scientific relevance, used as a reference, and/or with a substantial contribution to the development of geological sciences through history.'
