= Tapti River =

River in India

Coordinates: 21°06′N 72°41′E

Tapti Tapi
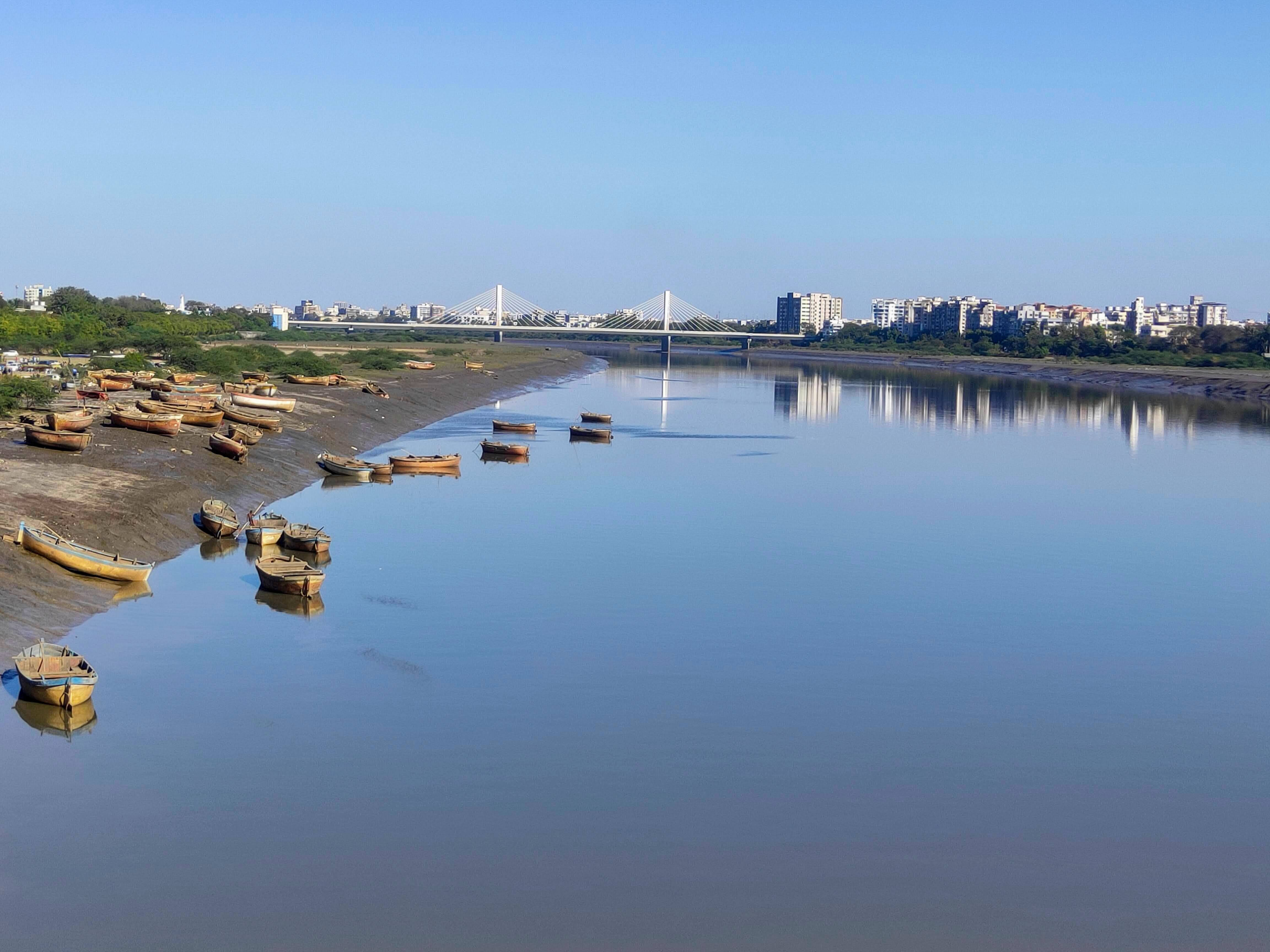
- Tapti or Tapi River at Surat.

Location
- Country: India
- State: Madhya Pradesh, Maharashtra, Gujarat
- Cities: Multai; Nepanagar; Burhanpur; Bhusawal; Mandvi; Surat

Physical characteristics
- Source: Multai, Madhya Pradesh
- Mouth: Gulf of Khambhat (Arabian Sea)
  - location: Dumas, Surat, Gujarat
- Length: 724 km (450 mi)approx.
- Basin size: 62,225 km^{2} (24,025 sq mi)
- Discharge
  - location: Dumas Beach
  - average: 489 m^{3}/s (17,300 cu ft/s)
  - minimum: 2 m^{3}/s (71 cu ft/s)
  - maximum: 9,830 m^{3}/s (347,000 cu ft/s)

Basin features
- Tributaries
  - left: Girna, Nesu, Buray, Panjhara, Bori, Waghur, Purna, Mona, Sipna
  - right: Arunavati, Vaki, Aner, Gomai

The Tapti River (or Tapi) is a river in central India located south of the Narmada River that flows westward before draining into the Arabian Sea. The river is approximately 724 km (450 mi) and flows through the states of Maharashtra, Gujarat and Madhya Pradesh. It flows through the city of Surat in Gujarat, and is crossed by several bridges, including the Magdalla, and the ONGC Bridge.

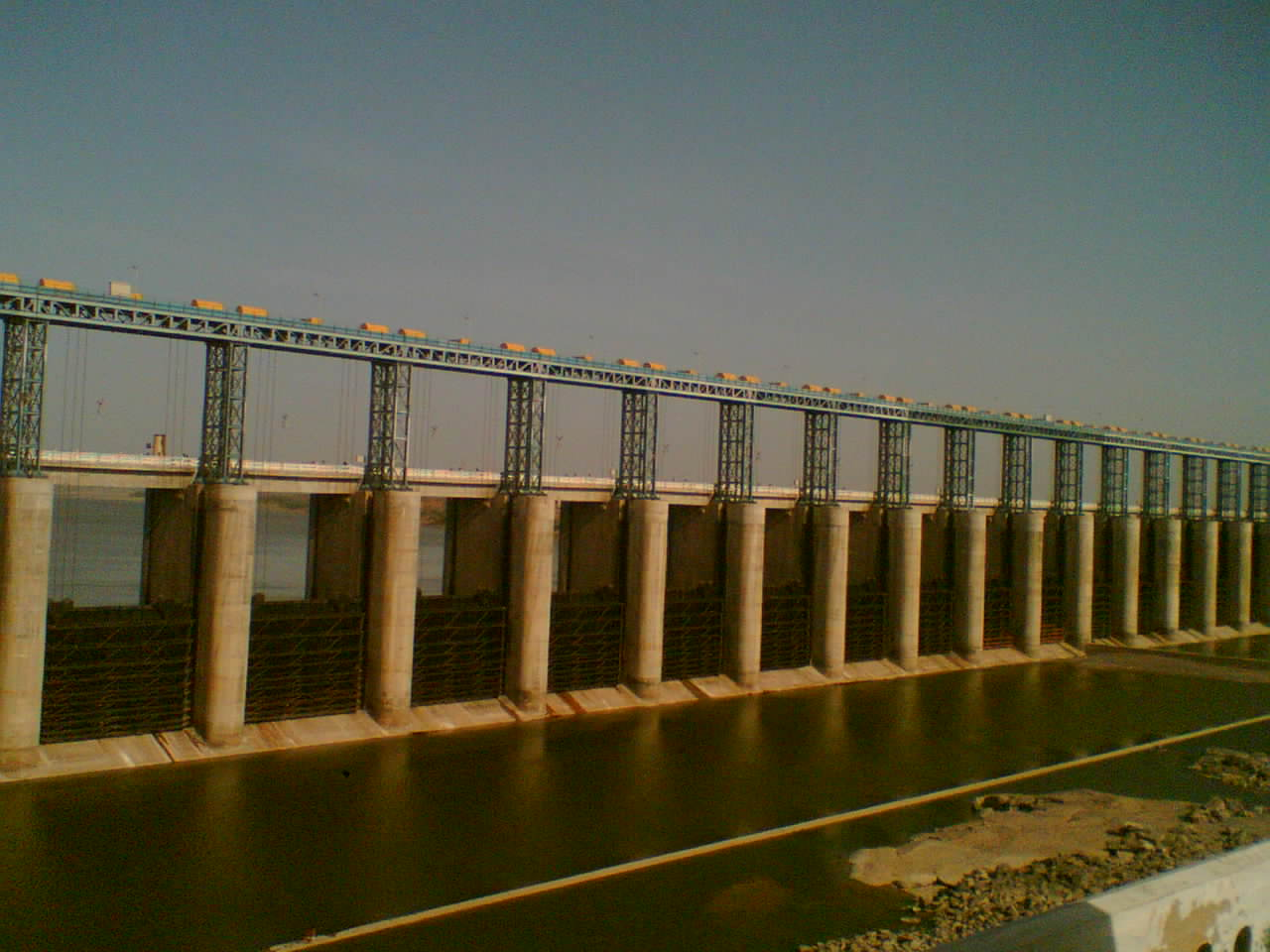
Prakasha Barrage on Tapti River, at Prakasha

On 7 August 1968, before the construction of the Ukai Dam to bring its waters under control and provide hydroelectric power, the Tapti River overflowed its banks during heavy rains in the monsoon season. More than 1,000 people drowned in the flood, and the city of Surat was submerged beneath 10 feet of water for several days. After the floodwaters receded, at least 1,000 more people died in Gujarat during a cholera epidemic from the contamination of the drinking water. The Tapti basin covers parts of Madhya Pradesh, Gujarat and Maharashtra.

== Course ==
The Tapti River rises in Multai, in Madhya Pradesh, and with a total length of 724 km is the second longest west-flowing river in India, after the Narmada River. The Tapti travels east to west and flows through the Indian states of . It drains into the Gulf of Khambhat, in the Arabian Sea, in Gujarat. The Tapti River has 14 major tributaries, four are right bank and ten are left bank tributaries. The right bank tributaries originate in the Satpura range and include the Vaki, Aner, Arunawati, and Gomai. The left bank tributaries include the Nesu, Amravati, Buray, Panjhara, Bori, Girna, Waghur, Purna, Mona, and Sipna. They originate in the Gawilgarh hills, Ajanta hills, the Western Ghats, and Satmalas.

== Etymology ==
The river is supposedly named after the goddess Tapati, the daughter of Surya, the Sun god and Chhaya. Tapati is the sister of Shani, Bhadra, Yamuna and Yama.

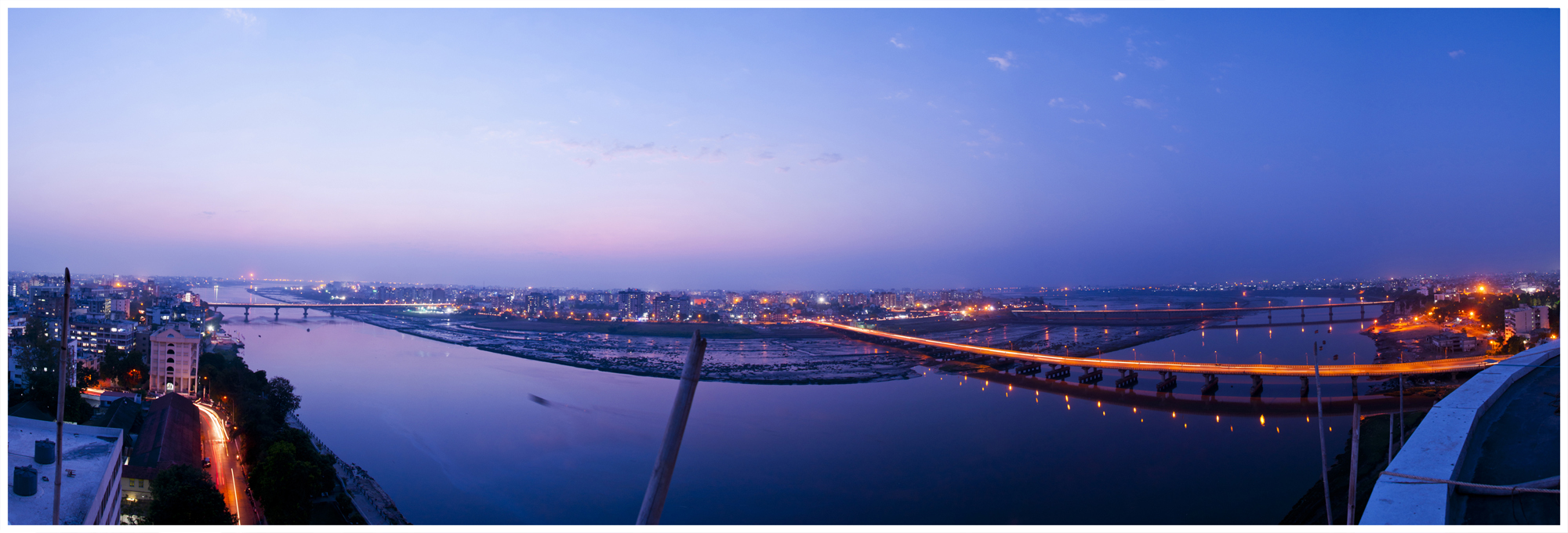
Panorama of Tapi River in Surat city

Surat, Bhusawal, Burhanpur and Multai towns are located near Tapti River.

== See also ==
- Gulf of Khambhat
