= List of state highways in Maharashtra =

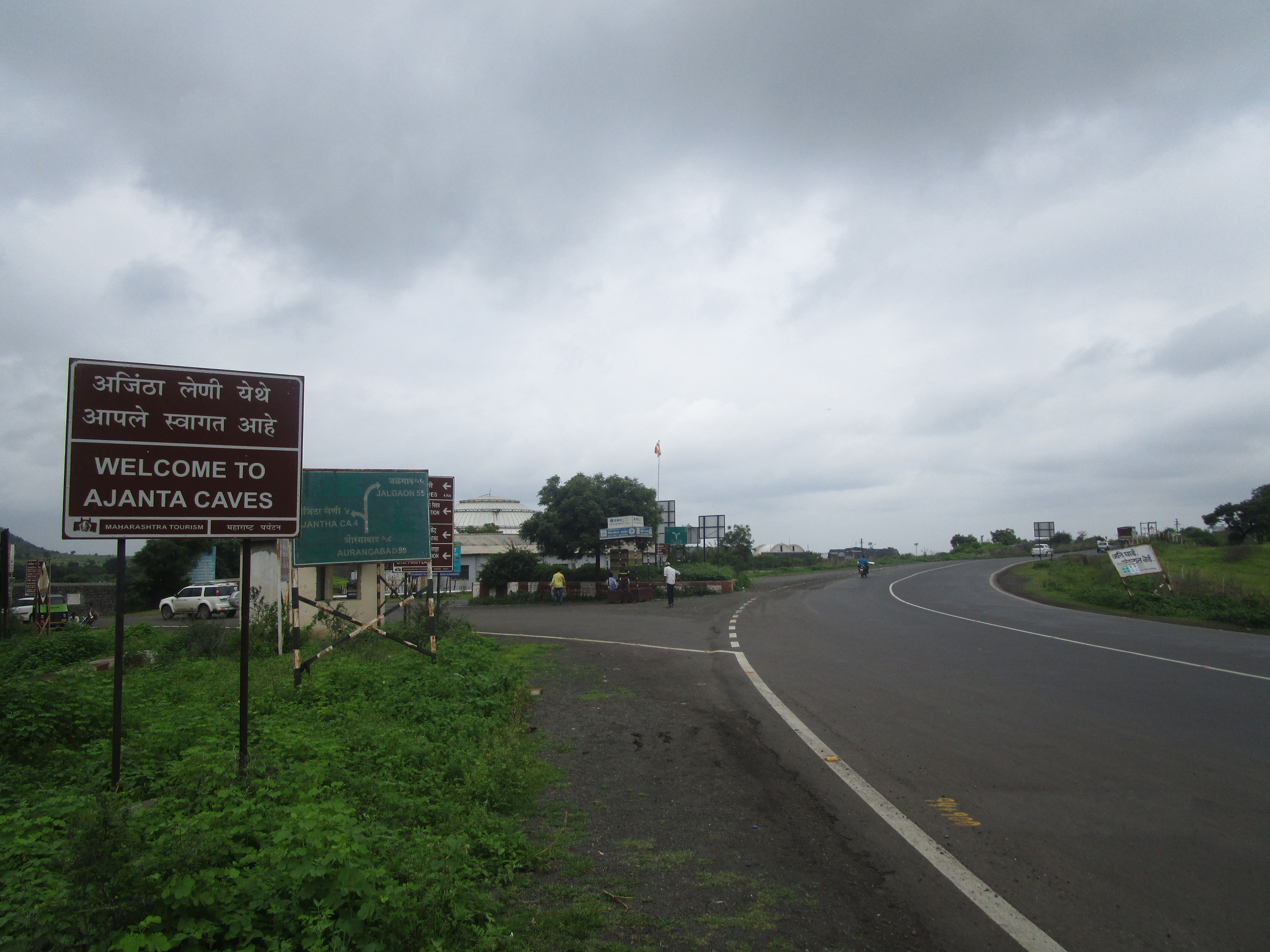
Welcome sign of Ajanta caves on MH MSH 8

The state highways are arterial routes of a state, linking district headquarters and important towns within the state and connecting them with national highways or highways of the neighbouring states.

== Introduction ==
Maharashtra state has a good road network. There are 10088 national highways and many state highways with total length of 33,705 km. Major state highways are MH MSH 1, MH MSH 3, MH MSH 6, MH MSH 9, MH MSH 10, MH MSH 11.

== Major state highways ==
State Highway No	Route	Length (in km)	Passes through – District(s)
MH MSH 1	Songir – Chimthane – Dondaicha – Nimgul – Shahada – Dhadgaon – Kathi – Molgi – Wadifali – Uptill Maharashtra – Gujarat state border.	181 km (112 mi)	Dhule, Nandurbar,
MH MSH 2	From Kalyan – Murbad – Ale Phata – Belhe Uptill Ahmednagar – Pathrdi – Beed	55 km (34 mi)	Thane, Ahmednagar, Beed
MH MSH 71	Via NH 9 From Indapur – Vadapuri – Bawada – Akluj – Velapur – Maloli – Falwani – Kolegaon – Mahud – Shivane – Sangole – Kadlas – Sonand Uptill – Jath		Pune, Solapur, Sangli
MH MSH 3	Via NH 211 From Solapur – Tuljapur – Ausa – Latur – Chakur – Ahmadpur – Nanded – Umarkhed – Mahagaon – Arni- Yavatmal – Wardha – Uptill Butibori – Via NH 7 Uptill Nagpur	608 km (378 mi)	Osmanabad, Latur, Nanded, Yavatmal, Wardha, Nagpur
MH MSH 6	Maharashtra – Madhya Pradesh border – Paratwada – Amravati – Yavatmal – Chandrapur		Amravati, Yavatmal, Chandrapur
MH MSH 8	Aurangabad – Ajanta – Fardapur – Pahur – Jamner – Bodwad – Muktainagar – Maharashtra – Madhya Pradesh state border.		Aurangabad, Jalgaon, Nandurbar
MH MSH 9	Nagpur – Umred – Nagbhid- Mul – Gondpipri		Chandrapur, Nagpur
MH MSH 10	Via NH 6 From Nadgaon – Morshi – Warud – Maharashtra – Madhya Pradesh state border.	95 km (59 mi)	Amravati
MH MSH 11	Via NH 53 From Gondia – Kohmara – Arjuni Morgaon – Wadsa – Gadchiroli – Maharashtra state border.		Gondia
MH MSH 24	Ajanta (Buldhana District) – Buldhana – Warwand – Khamgaon – Shegaon – Deori (Buldhana District) – Akot – Anjangaon – Paratwada – Maharashtra – Madhya Pradesh state border.		Buldhana, Akola Jalgaon, Amravati,

== State highways ==
State Highway No	Route	Length (in km)	Passes through district(s)
MH SH 1	Shahada – Sangvi – Khamkheda – Lasur – Amalner		Nandurbar, Dhule, Jalgaon
MH SH 2	Via MH SH 1 From Shahada – Mhasavad – Islampur (Shahada Taluka) – Lakkadkot – Ranipur (Shahada Taluka) – Nagziri – Toranmal		Nandurbar
MH SH 3	Akkalkuva – Gangapur (Akkalkuva Taluka) – Khapran – Devgui (Akkalkuva Taluka) – Dab – Walamba Kh. – Bijaripati – Molgi		Nandurbar
MH SH 4	From Maharashtra – Madhya Pradesh state border – Loni (Raver Taluka) – Raver – Yawal – Chopda – hated – Shirpur – Arthe – Shahada – Talode – Akkalkuwa – Nawapada (Akkalkuva Taluka) – Uptill Maharashtra – Gujarat state border.		Jalgaon, Dhule, Nandurbar
MH SH 5	From Maharashtra – Madhya Pradesh state border – Shahada – Prakasha – Nandurbar – Khanbada – Visarwadi		Nandurbar,
MH SH 6	From Maharashtra – Gujarat state border – Nandurbar – Ghotane – Dondaicha – Amalner		Jalgaon, Dhule, Nandurbar,
MH SH 7	Prakasha – Ghotane – Sakri – Pimpalner (Sakri Taluka) – Satana – Devla (??) – Chandwad – Lasalgaon – Nandgaon – Shirdi		Dhule, Nandurbar, Nashik
MH SH 8	Nandurbar – Raipur – Sakri – Dhmnar – Malegaon		Dhule, Nandurbar, Nashik
MH SH 9	Dhanora – Khadbara – Umran – Sawrat – Raipur – Pratappur – Uptill Maharashtra – Gujarat state border.		Nandurbar
MH SH 10	Dondaicha – Shevade – Mehergaon – Kusumbe – Malegaon – Manmad – Kopargaon – Rahata – Rahuri – Ahmednagar – Daund – Vita – Tasgaon		Dhule, Sangli
MH SH 11	Sawalde – Sindkheda – Chimthane- Shewad – Balsane – Raipur – Sakri		Dhule
MH SH 12	Kharadbari – Navpada – Nizjampur – Lamkani – Nandane – Sakhad		Dhule
MH SH 13	Navapur – Raipur – Pratappur – Kudashi – Pimpalner (Sakri Taluka) – Sakri		Dhule, Nandurbar,
MH SH 14	Mehergaon – Dhule – Amalner – Savkheda – Chopda – Vaijapur – Maharashtra – Madhya Pradesh state border.		Dhule, Jalgaon
MH SH 15	Arvi – Borkund – Bhadgaon (Jalgaon District)		Jalgaon, Dhule
MH SH 16	SH-7 to Deshirwade – Degaon – Mahsdi – Ubhand – Hingane – Ajnale – Raver – Chitod – Dhule	81.4	Dhule
MH SH 17	Sakri – Nandurbar – Prakasha		Nandurbar Dhule
MH SH 18	Ajande – Waghambe – Salher Wadi – Salwan – Karanjkhed – Pimpale Budruk – Mohbari – Kanashi	49	Nashik
MH SH 19	Malegaon – Chalisgaon – Bhadgaon (Jalgaon District) – Pachora – Pahur		Jalgaon
MH SH 20	Parshuramnagar – Ajande – Mulher – Taharabad – Jaikheda – Askheda – Nampur – Vaygaon – Talwade – Lakhmapur – Umbrane – Dongaon – Manmad	105	Nashik
MH SH 21	Akole – Dhamangaon Pat – Bota		Ahmednagar
MH SH 22	Dhule – Chalisgaon – Daulatabad		Dhule, Aurangabad
MH SH 24	Chalisgaon – Nandgaon		Jalgaon, Nashik
MH SH 25	Nandgaon – Tirpale – Bhadgaon (Jalgaon district) – Erandol		Jalgaon, Nashik
MH SH 27	Pune – Shirur – Ahmednagar		Pune, Ahmednagar
MH SH 42	From Junction of NH 3 at Kapurbavdi (Thane district) – Uptill Junction of NH 8 near Ghodbunder.	15	Thane
MH SH 44	Shahapur – Kalsubai – Akole – Sangamner – Shrirampur – Nevasa – Gevrai		Thane – Ahmednagar – Parbhani
MH SH 45	Sinnar – Loni – Kolhar		Ahmednagar
MH SH 46	Malshejghat – Sangamner		Ahmednagar
MH SH 47	Shrirampur – Sivral		Aurangabad
MH SH 48	Amalner – Parola – Bhadgaon (Jalgaon District)		Jalgaon, Aurangabad
MH SH 49	Rahuri – Sakur – Shreerampur		Ahmednagar Solapur
MH SH 50	Shrigonda – Shirur – Parner – Takli Dhokeshwar – Sakur		Ahmednagar
MH SH 51	Shirur – Nighoj – Alkuti – Belhe	55	Pune Ahmednagar
MH SH 53	Bhimashankar-Ghodegaon – Manchar Nimgaonsawa-Belhe	102	PunePune District
MH SH 54	Shirur – Bhimashankar – Karjat – Panvel – Uran – Mumbai		Pune, Mumbai
MH SH 55	Shirur – Shrigonda – Jamkhed		Pune Ahmednagar
MH SH 57	Bhukum – Urawade – Mutha – Kharwade – Kolawade – Lavarde – Temghar – Dasave – Lavasa	38	Pune
MH SH 60	Ahmednagar – Jeur – Ghodegaon – Handinimgaon – Newasa Fata		Ahmednagar
MH SH 61	Belhe – pargaon – Loni – Pabal-shikrapur-astapur-Uruli kanchan-Jejuri – Nira – Lonand – Wathar – Satara	208	Pune, Satara
MH SH 64	Pune – Saswad – Jejuri		Pune
MH SH 65	Nasrapur – Jambhali – Ambavane – Karanjawne – Margasani – Vinzar – Velhe – Bhatti – Kolambi – Pasali – Kelad – Nigade – Kumble		Pune
MH SH 67	Daund – Siddhatek – Rashin – Karmala – Paranda – Barshi – Osmanabad – Ausa		Pune, Ahmednagar, Solapur, Osmanabad, Latur
MH SH 68	Shevgaon – Pathardi – Kada – Mirajgaon – Karjat – Rashin		Ahmednagar
MH SH 70	Pandharpur – Velapur – Malshiras – Natepute – Dharampuri – Barad – Phaltan – Lonand – Shirwal – Bhor – Warandh – Mahad		Solapur Satara Pune Raigad
MH SH 72	Satara- medha – kelghar-medha – medha – Mahabaleshwar – Kapade – Poladpur	83	Satara, Raigad; Osmanabad, Latur – Solapur
MH SH 78	Guhagar – Chiplun – Koyana – Patan – Karad – Vita – Jath – Bijapur(Karnataka)		Ratnagiri, Satara, Sangli, Bijapur(Karnataka)
MH SH 84	Patur – Balapur		Akola
MH SH 92	Nagothana – Pali – Amnori – Parali – Durshet – Khopoli		Raigad
MH SH 107	Sangameshwar – Devrukh – Sakharpa		Ratnagiri
MH SH 110	Rajapur – Lanja – Sakharpa		Ratnagiri
MH SH 112	Sawantwadi – Amboli –		Sindhudurg, Kolhapur
MH SH 115	Vijaydurg – Talere alias Tarala – Gaganbawada – Kale – Kolhapur	144	Sindhudurg, Kolhapur
MH SH 116	Kankavli – Phondaghat – Radhanagari – Kolhapur		Sindhudurg, Kolhapur
MH SH 123	Sawantwadi Talavade Matond Shiroda Redi		
MH SH 127	Kale – Bajar Bhogaon – Karanjphen – Anuskura – Pachal – Rajapur	90	Kolhapur, Ratnagiri
MH SH 129	Kagal – Sangav – Hupari – Shiradwad – Lat – HerwadRoad		
MH SH 134	Sankeshwar-Gadhinglaj-Kadgaon-Ajra-Amboli-Sawantvadi	110	Kolhapur, Sindhudurg
MH SH 137	miraj-arjunwad-shirol-kurundwad-maharashtrrastate border(borgao)		
MH SH 141	Solapur – Khandeshwar – Mirajgaon – Ahmednagar		Solapur, Ahmednagar
MH SH 142	Ahmednagar – Kada – Jamkhed		Solapur, Ahmednagar
MH SH 147	Phaltan – Lalgun – Pusegaon – Aundh – Gopuj – Nimsod – Mhasurne		Satara
MH SH 148	Ahmednagar – Amrapur – Shevgaon – Paithan		Jalna, Parbhani, Aurangabad, Ahmednagar
MH SH 149	Mohol – Sayyed Warvade – Kurul – Kamti – Kandhalgaon – Mandrup – Junction at NH-13		Solapur
MH SH 151	Barshi – VAIRAG – Solapur – Akkalkot – Aaland		Solapur
MH SH 157	Pathardi – Kada – Ashti – Jamkhed – Bhum		Ahmednagar
MH SH 160	Kalamb – Tandulja – Latur		Latur
MH SH 162	Ambejogai – Tandulja – Murud – Kanegaon – Ujni Akkalkot		beed, Latur, Osmanabad, Solapur
MH SH 164	Jawli – Umarga		Latur, Osmanabad
MH SH 165	Ausa – Jawali – Nilanga to Bhalki (KA)		Latur
MH SH 166	Latur – Netur – Helamb – Devni – Sawargaon		Latur
MH SH 167	Nalegaon – Netur – Lambota – Nilanga – Kasar Shilpi – Umarga		Latur, Osmanabad
MH SH 168	Renapur – Nalegaon – Udgir – Deglur		Latur, Nanded
MH SH 169	Parli – Ghatnadur – Renapur		Beed, Latur
MH SH 171	KhamgaonNH 6 – Janephal – Deulgaon Sakarsha – Mehkar – Lonar – Mantha		Buldhana, Jalna, Parbhani
MH SH 173	Shegaon – Yeualkhed – Manasgaon – Warwat – Bawanbir – Tunki on MH SH 194		Buldhana, Jalna,
MH SH 176	Malkapur – Buldhana – Chikhli – Deulgaon Raja – Jalna		Buldhana, Jalna,
MH SH 178	Kannad – Sillod – Deulgaon Raja		Aurangabad, Jalna, Buldhana
MH SH 183	Deulgaon Raja – Sindkhed Raja – Sultanpur – Lonar – Risod – Washim – Pusad – Mahagaon		Jalna, Washim, Yavatmal
MH SH 184	Jalgaon – Bawdal – Pachora – Sillod		Jalgaon, Auragabad
MH SH 186	Pahur – Neri – Jalgaon – Idgaon – Kingaon – Waghjira – Tinsamali to MP		Jalgaon
MH SH 187	Bhusawal – Yawal		Jalgaon
MH SH 188	Motala – Parda – Thad – Fatepur – Wakdi – Jamner		Buldhana, Jalgaon,
MH SH 189	Sawda – Pal to Bhikangaon (MP)		Jalgaon
MH SH 190	Malkapur – Bodwad – Kurhe – Nasirabad		Jalgaon, Buldhana
MH SH 191	Bodwad – Fatepur – Tondapur-Bharudkheda- Kumbhari – Wakod		Jalgaon,
MH SH 193	Buldhana – Dhad –		Buldhana, Jalna
MH SH 194	Dolarkheda – Ichhapur – Khandvi – Jalgaon Jamod – Tunki on MH SH 173 – Hiwarkhed – Akot – Daryapur – Kholapur – Dhabhori – Valgaon – Revsa – Nandgaon NH 6		Buldhana, Akola, Amravati
MH SH 195	from Burhanpur(MP) – Umapur – Jalgaon Jamod – Sangrampur – Warwat – Telhara – Warula on MH SH 24		Buldhana, Akola
MH SH 196	Motala – Nandura – Khandvi		Buldhana
MH SH 197	Arni – Digras – Manora – Mangrulpir – Mahaan – Barshitakli – Akola – Dabki – Gaigaon – Nimba – Manasgaon		Yavatmal, Washim, Akola, Buldhana
MH SH 198	Patur – Wadegaon – Balapur – Shegaon		
MH SH 199	Chandur – Kherda – Pinjar – Barshitakli – Kapsi – Wadegaon – Ambetakli – Undri – Warwand on MH SH 24		Washim, Akola, Buldhana
MH SH 200	Akola – Lakhpuri – Durgwada – Shelubazar – Runmochan – Bhatkuli – Amravati		Akola, Amravati
MH SH 201	Kinkhed – Dahihanda – Daryapur – Chandurbazar		Akola, Amravati
MH SH 203	Dhulghat – Asalwada – Chikhaldara – Achalpur – Chandurbazar		Amravati
MH SH 204	Patur – Kapasi – Akola – Dewri – Warula – Akot – Jhira – Harisal on MH SH 6		Parbhani, Washim, Akola, Amravati
MH SH 205	Chikhi – Amdapur		Buldhana
MH SH 206	Chikhli – Mehkar – Risod		Buldhana
MH SH 207	Mehkar – Malegaon – Karanja – Pimpalgaon – Yevti – Talegaon		Buldhana, Washim, Amravati
MH SH 209	Washim – Dhanora – Mangrulpir		Washim
MH SH 210	Khapri – Darwha – Jawala – Mangrul – Ghatanji – Karegaon		Washim, Yavatmal
MH SH 211	Karanja – Nainy – Khapri – Manora		Washim
MH SH 212	Yavatmal – Darwha – Karanja – Murtajapur – Daryapur – Anjangaon		Yavatmal, Washim, Akola, Amravati
MH SH 213	Darwha – Digras – Pusad		Yavatmal
MH SH 215	Pusad – Kalamnuri		Yavatmal – Hingoli
MH SH 217	Gangakhed – Kingaon – Dhalegaon – Ahmadpur – Shirur Tajband – Udgir – Torgi to Bidar (KA)		Parbhani, Latur
MH SH 219	Gangakhed – Ujani		Parbhani, Latur
MH SH 222	Udgir – Kandhar		Latur, Nanded
MH SH 225	Shiru Tajband – Mukhed		Latur, Nanded
MH SH 232	Mahagaon – Kinwat		Yavatmal, Nanded
MH SH 233	Chimur – Warora – Wani – Rajani – Kelapur – Parwa		Chandrapur, Yavatmal, Ganchiroli,
MH SH 234	Parwa – Mangi – Kadori – Patan – Mukutban – Purad – Mohada		Yavatmal
MH SH 236	Sangvi on MH SH 212 – Ner, Yavatmal – Babhulgaon – Kalamb – Ralegaon – Pimpalapur – Wani – Shivpur – Mohada – Kurai		Yavatmal
MH SH 237	Ghatanji – Ramnagar – Yavatmal – Babhulgaon – Tiosa – Kurha – Dhamangaon		Amravati
MH SH 239	Valgaon – Naya Aikheda – Jarwadi – Chandurbazar		Amravati
MH SH 240	Chandurbazar – Morshi – Salburdi		Amravati
MH SH 241	Nandgaon – Chandur – Kurha – Arvi(Wardha)		Amravati
MH SH 243	(Continued from MSH 6) – Amravati – Chandur – Pulgaon – Hinganghat – Jamb (NH 44) – (continued to Chandrapur, MH till Maharashtra – Telangana border via MSH 264)		Amravati. Wardha
MH SH 244	(From Yavatmal via MSH3) – Pulgaon – Arvi – Talegaon (on NH6) – Ashti – Warud to Multai (MP)		Wardha, Amravati
MH SH 245	Karanja – Bharsinngi, Jalalkheda-Mowad-MP Border		Wardha, Nagpur
MH SH 246	Sawargaon – Narkhed – Mowad		Nagpur
MH SH 247	Katol – Sonegaon		Nagpur, Wardha
MH SH 248	Nagpur – Kalmeshwar Katol – Warud		Nagpur, Amravati
MH SH 249	Saoner – Parseoni – Ramtek – Tumsar – Gondia		Nagpur, Bhandara, Gondia
MH SH 250	Bazargaon – Kohali – Mohpa – Saoner – Kelwad		Nagpur,
MH SH 253	Mouda – Ramtek		Nagpur,
MH SH 255	Nagpur – Hingna		Nagpur,
MH SH 257	Ghatangi – Parwa –		Yavatmal
MH SH 258	Wardha-HinganghatSamudrapur-Umred		Wardha, Nagpur,
MH SH 261	Kuhi – Umred		Nagpur,
MH SH 262	Butibori – Umred		Nagpur,
MH SH 264	(From Nagpur via NH44 – Jamb – Warora – Chandrapur – Rajura – Maharashtra – Telangana border.	112	Wardha, Chandrapur,
MH SH 30	Nashik – Niphad – Vinchur – Yeola – Vaijapur – Aurangabad – Jalna		Nashik, Jalna, Aurangabad
MH SH 35	After Kalshi Bridge, Thane – Bhiwandi – Umberpada – Vada – Pali – Kudan – Jhawhar		Thane
MH SH 40	Makunsar – Saphale – Virar – Raypada – Vasai – joins NH8 near Mandvi, Vasai		Thane
MH SH 41			Thane
MH SH 43	Kalyan Phata – Riverwood Park – Katai Naka – Taloja Bypass – Badlapur – Karjat – Khopoli		Thane
State Highway 51A	NaneghatJunnarboriBelhe((korthan pimpalgav rotha))((kanhur pathar))	106	Pune Thane a.nager
MH SH 52	Pune – narayangaon – juuner-Madh pargav		Pune Pune
MH SH 53	Bhimashankar – Ghodegaon – Manchar Nimgaonsawa – Belhe		puneDistrict Pune
MH SH 54	Shirur rajgurunagr bhimashnakar		Pune
MH SH 58			Pune
MH SH 61	Belhe – pargaon-loni – pabal – shikarapur – ashtapur – uruli kanchan – jejuri – Nira – lonanad – shatara		Pune 208km
MH SH 62	Shirur supe sangvi phaltan		Punesatara
MH SH 63			Pune
MH SH 66			Pune
MH SH 74			Solapur
MH SH 76			Solapur
MH SH 85			Raigad
MH SH 143	Pathardi –		Solapur, Ahmednagar
MH SH 144	Pathardi		Ahmednagar
MH SH 145	Mayani - Mhaswad		Satara
MH SH 146			Ahmednagar
MH SH 153			Solapur
MH SH 154	Akkalkot		Solapur
MH SH 155			Pune
MH SH 161			Solapur
MH SH 163			Latur, Solapur
MH SH 170			Parbhani
MH SH 174			Jalna
MH SH 174A			Jalna
MH SH 175			Jalna
MH SH 176	Solapur		Solapur
MH SH 177	Sindkhed Raja –		Buldhana, Jalna
MH SH 179			Aurangabad
MH SH 180			Jalna, Aurangabad
MH SH 180A			Jalna
MH SH 181			Jalna
MH SH 183A			Jalna
MH SH 185			Jalgaon
MH SH 202	Dharni –		Amravati
MH SH 208			Washim
MH SH 220			Parbhani
MH SH 221			Parbhani
MH SH 251	Rampuri		Nagpur, Bhandara,
MH SH 252	Aroli		Nagpur, Bhandara
MH SH 254	Kuhi		Nagpur,
MH SH 263	Bhiwapur –		Wardha, Nagpur,
MH SH 265			Nagpur, Chandrapur,
MH SH 266	Tarsa		Nagpur,
MH SH 267			Nagpur, Chandrapur,
MH SH 268			Chandrapur,
MH SH 269			Chandrapur,
MH SH 270			Bhandara,
MH SH 271			Bhandara,
MH SH 272			Bhandara,
MH SH 273			Gondia,
	Gondia, Kohamara, Arjuni Morgaon, Wadsa		Gondia, Ganchiroli,
MH SH 276			Gondia, Ganchiroli,
MH SH 277			Bhandara, Gondia
MH SH 280			Ganchiroli,
MH SH 352	Thanegaon NH 53 – Bori – Murti – Katol		Wardha, Nagpur
	Arjuni Morgaon – Gondia		Bhandara
	Arjuni Morgaon, Sakoli, Maharashtra		Gondia, Bhandara
MH SH 368	Bhorwadi - Nagadawadi - Kandali - Bori - Belhe - Khandeshwar Nagar - Garkhindi - Pimpalgaon Rotha - Kanhoor	43	Pune, Ahmednagar
