= Major State Highway 1 (Maharashtra) =

Road in Maharashtra, India

Major State Highway 1

Route information
- Maintained by MSRDC
- Length: 180 km (110 mi)

Major junctions
- South end: Songir, Dhule
- North end: Wadfali, Nandurbar

Location
- Country: India
- State: Maharashtra
- Districts: Dhule, Nandurbar
- Primary destinations: Songir, Chimthane, Dondaicha, Nimgul, Shahada, Dhadgaon, Kathi, Molgi, Wadifali

Highway system
- Roads in India; Expressways; National; State; Asian; State Highways in Maharashtra

Maharashtra Major State Highway 1, commonly referred to as MH MSH 1, is a major state highway that runs south through Dhule and Nandurbar districts in the state of Maharashtra. This state highway touches numerous cities and villages, namely Songir, Chimthane, Dondaicha, Nimgul, Shahada, Dhadgaon, Kathi, Molgi, Wadifali and then proceeds south-west towards Maharashtra-Gujarat state border. This highway enters Gujarat State near Wadifali village which is on border of Nandurbar district of Maharashtra and Narmada district of Gujarat and ends at Dumkhal village which is just 15 km South-East of Sardar Sarovar Dam.

== Route description ==
Below is the brief summary of the route followed by this state highway.

=== Dhule District ===
==== Dhule Taluka ====
This highway starts off from intersection of National Highway 3 near Songir village and proceeds North-West towards Sondale village in Sindkheda Taluka. After traveling for another 2 km (1.2 mi), it exits Dhule taluka just before Sondale village and enters the Sindkheda taluka.

== Major junctions ==
=== National highways ===
1. NH 3 near Songir village, Dhule taluka, Dhule district.

=== State highways ===
1. State Highway 11 at Chimthana village, Sindkheda taluka, Dhule district.
2. State Highway 10 at Dondaicha, Sindkheda taluka, Dhule district.
3. State Highway 4 at near Shahada, Shahada Taluka, Nandurbar district.
4. State Highway 5 at Shahada, Shahada Taluka, Nandurbar district.
5. State Highway 2 at Mhasavad village, Shahada Taluka, Nandurbar district.

== Connections ==
Many villages, cities and towns in various districts are connected by this state highway.

== See also ==
1. List of state highways in Maharashtra
