= Dhawade =

Village in Maharashtra

Dhawade Zirve Dhawade
- village
- Location in Maharashtra, India Dhawade (India)
- Coordinates: 21.33°N 74.48°E
- Country: India
- State: Maharashtra
- Region: West India
- Division: Nashik Division
- District: Dhule
- Talukas: Sindhkheda

Population (2011)
  - Total: 3,239

Languages
  - Official: Marathi
- Time zone: UTC+5:30 (IST)
- Nearest city: Dondaicha
- Sex ratio: 106:100♂/♀
- Literacy: 70%
- Distance from Dondaicha: 7 kilometres (4.3 mi) North (Road)

Dhawade is a small village in the state of Maharashtra, India. It is located in the Sindkheda taluka of the Dhule district on the Maharashtra State Highway 6 (MH SH 6)

== Etymology ==
This village is more commonly referred to as "Zirve-Dhawade" to specify its location.

== Geography ==
Dhawade has a total village area of 180,316.72 m² ha. Out of that, 2,700 ha of land is under cultivation, of which 900 ha is irrigated and 1,800 ha is rain fed. Of the remaining, 285.82 ha is under forest, 53 ha under village habitation, 0.2 ha. is burial ground, and the balance is under roads, path, streams, and rocky outcrops.

The topography of the land within the village boundary varies from hilly to plains. The forest areas are hilly with plateau at the top. They are cris-crossed with enumerable streams. The areas under the cultivation is generally flat especially where it is irrigated. The flood irrigation is practiced which necessitates level field. The land under rain fed cultivation is somewhat undulating .

The soil type varies from black cotton to murrumy. Soil is generally black cotton in flatter area. It is reddish to buff in coloured along gentle slopes. The soils tend to be reddish with high proportion of murum in areas which are exposed. In highly eroded areas and steep slopes in hilly area the underlying rock is seen exposed. The depth of the soil varies from few centimeters to 20 meters within the village limits.

There is small river the Iraas (Hiraasan as per the state records) on the bank of which this village is located. The other two small streams are Waghad and Bhalkhai. There are three water bodies all within the village limits. The first one the minor irrigation tank on the Iraas river, the second, percolation tank on Waghad stream and the third, percolation tank on Bhalkhai stream. The stored resource is small in extent and quantity but suffice to meet the village needs of water for drinking and other domestic use. All these water bodies have been boon to the village as they have been recharging ground water in their downstream where in the agricultural land is laying and farmers have dug up well for irrigation.

The total forest area is 739.144 ha, out of which 285.79 ha is assigned to the Joint Forest Management Committee of Dhawade. The forest area is identified by the compartment numbers in forest records like the survey numbers in land records. The entire forest area is vested in the state government of Maharashtra.

Wild animals like black buck, fox, hare, hyena, wolf, and wild boar are reported in this forest, but the population is very small. During recent times (2013–14), panther (Panthera pardus) is reported to be seen in the forests of Dhawade. This big cat is also reported to be preying on cattle of the villagers who are staying in their farm houses located along the forest boundary. Killing of big sized domestic animals like bulls, buffaloes and lifting off their young ones is reported to on increase since last year. Though there is scheme from the state government to compensate the damage like this, the villagers rarely claim for the damage due to remoteness and non availability of local staff besides intricacies involved in such claims getting settled.

=== Climate ===
Dhawade has three distinct seasons during the year: summer, winter, and the rainy season.

The average annual maximum temperature is 35 degrees Celsius and the average annual minimum is 16 degrees Celsius. April, May, and June are summer months when the climate is hot, with daytime temperatures reaching up to a maximum of 42 degrees Celsius. May is the hottest month. In this village, the microclimate is such that although the days is hot, the nights are cooler. Dusty and hot winds of medium velocity are common during summer months. Storms are not recorded. Winter is spread over from November to mid-February, when the temperature drops down to minimum of 10 degrees Celsius. Snowfall is unknown. Smog is unheard, however hailstorms of mild intensity are rare and reported in once in a decade.

Rainy season starts by mid-June and lasts till September. The average annual rain fall is 600 mm spread over about 60 rainy days. The nearest rain gauge station is at Dhule. Rain is only precipitation that is received from the monsoon winds. Showers from North –East monsoon are occasional during winter. Occasionally, dew formation takes place in very cold days during winter season.

Dhawade rarely has water scarcity, which is common in many villages of Dhule Taluka. The last drought year was 1972.

During the southwest monsoon season, the humidity is generally about 70%. The air is dry during the rest of the year. The driest part of the year is the summer season when the relative humidity is about 20% at noon. During the monsoon season, the skies are heavily clouded. For the rest of the year, the sky is mostly clear.

Winds are generally light to moderate with some strengthening in force during the summer and monsoon seasons. During the southwest monsoon season, winds are mainly south-westerly to westerly. In the post-monsoon season, winds are light and variable. In the winter and summer seasons, winds are mostly from directions between southwest and northwest.

== Demographics ==
As of 2011 census, Dhawade had a population of 4,639 with 2,390 males and 2,249 females. Males constitute 51% of the population and females 49%. Dhawade has an average literacy rate of 58.99%. Male Literacy is 70.16%, and female literacy is 47.13%. In Dhawade, 16.53% of the population is under 6 years of age.

== Government and politics ==
Dhawade has a Village Gram Panchayat for day-to-day administration, which is grouped with administration of hamlet of Hingane. Hingane is located in south direction at a distance of 3 km. The group gram panchayat was established on 4-11-1952. The District Zilla Panchayat headquarters is at Dhule and the Block Panchayat is also at Dhule.

Dhawade has no commercial banks or co-operative banks present within the village, but there are 1 agricultural credit societies, 1 non-agricultural credit societies and 3 other credit societies present within the village. Dhawade has Joint Forest Management Committee (JFMC) constituted to protect, conserve, develop and manage adjoining forests.

== Economy ==
Dhawade has a farming economy, traditional crops include millet, coconut, cotton, bhuimug (ground nut), jowar, onion and wheat. Farmers rely on rain water as well as water from rivers for farming needs.

As there is limited scope for irrigation water availability from state managed irrigation facilities numbering three; first the minor irrigation tank on Iraas river (Hiraasan as per the state records ), the second, percolation tank on Waghhad stream and the third, percolation tank on Bhalkhai stream all within the village limits; the villagers have invested their own money in creating water availability for irrigation by way of digging up wells wherever underground water is available and pumping the water up to their farms. At times the water is available at distance of 4 to 6 kilometers away.

Farmers from Dhawade on their own; not with any support from the government funding, have taken up land development works to bring more fallow land under cultivation over period of last two decades. This activity is still going on during 2010. These land developmental works include leveling, terracing, bunding, nalla (small streams) training etc.

Advanced farming techniques like improved seeds, drip irrigation, chemical and organic fertilizers are used. In the last few years, horticulture has been used more often for growing sitafal, dalimb and papaya.

Such entrepreneurship have led to increase in the all round agricultural products output, with the cultivation of crops of commercial nature like floriculture.

During last 5 years there is shortage of farm laborers in the village as the demand has gone up steadily, due to increase in area under irrigation. This has led to increase in wage rates and laborers from other adjoining villages viz. Padalde, Ajnale, and Mehergaon, are being called to overcome the labor shortage. There is also spurt in demand for farm yard manure as many farmers practice organic farming to a great extent. Dhawade is an example in Dhule Taluka to showcase the incremental benefits of irrigation.

Dairying is another major economic activity of the village. Traditionally it was the profession of Gawali community over decades. But other communities have also taken up to dairying. Buffaloes are reared for milk . The milk is mostly sold to traders from Dhule city, who also finance for buying the buffaloes.

=== Village cottage industries ===
Historically, in Maharashtra, certain professions or village level services at village level were community assigned over the centuries. Proprietary of the professions or village level services particularly at village level, have always remained with particular community and enabled to gain skills and expertise in that particular profession. There are 12 such professions assigned to the various 12 communities. These professions are called 12 balute and these communities are called 12 Balutedars - village level services providers/workers. As per this system, the balutedar has to provide for his services of routine nature to the farmers throughout the year. Under the balute system, in-exchange of services provided, farmers had to make payment in kind; mostly in the form fixed volume of grains and other agriculture produce of food value, every year after the harvest. This system had long been a part of the village societal arrangement since times immemorial. However, there may be variations seen in the 21st century with spread of education, and economic development. Besides there are other village industries in which all communities can engage themselves.

Tailoring has been the traditional occupation of the Shimpi community in Dhawade. However, with the passage of time and changes in the socio-economic conditions and availability of professional training in tailoring to all from government at various places, a number of persons from other communities have taken to this occupation. The numbers of females of other communities also do tailoring and have specialisation in women garments. Carpentry is important village cottage industry in Dhawade, as the majority of farmers regularly require their services for manufacturing of new agricultural implements and for repairs to them. Broom making is the hereditary and traditional occupation of the Mang community in Dhawade.

== Culture and tourism ==
Dhawade has no recreational facilities like cinemas or video halls.

Dhawade has no cultural facilities like sports-clubs, stadium or auditorium. The village has a tradition of conducting Helyachi Takkar (Male Bull's Head on fight) on the occasion of the Diwali festival, outside the village. The villagers gather in large numbers to watch the fight on the river bankside where this fight is conducted.

As milk production is also a major profession for this village, the farmers specially rear the male buffaloes for this fight.

Dhawade population consists of various communities - Kunabi, Mali, Gawali, Bhil, Koli, Sutar, Shimpi, Harijan. There are separate temples of their faith or deity, constructed by each community in and around the village site Gaothan, where the cultural programmes take place. These programmes are sponsored by individual communities and take place almost every year; however these programmes are attended by almost all other communities. At times adjoining villages also participate on invitation. These programmes include Bhajan (Devotional songs), Kirtan (Saint lead religious discourse), Bhandara (Community sponsored lunch) etc. The duration of these programmes ranges from a day to week.

Dhawade has an annual fair in the month of Chaitra (March/April) of the Hindu calendar in reverence to the goddess Bhavani maata. In this fair the Tagatrao the country-made chariot is pulled by the pair of bulls from the village to the temple of the goddess about two km away. The pulling of the Tagatrao is not an easy job as it is both heavier and larger than a regular cart. It is also an honor for any villager to engage his bulls for pulling Tagatrao up to the temple. It is a two-day celebration when the wrestling competitions are conducted by the village elders. In this wrestling competition rewards consisting of utensils and cash are paid to the winners. Wrestlers from the adjoining villages and taluka participate in this competition. A large crowd gathers to see and cheer the participants. This event has been going for time unknown.

The second day of the village fair is celebrated by the villagers when the Tamasha - a local countryside performance of folk dance and drama - is performed in the village. The Tamasha party is invited well in advance and their show is generally booked.

Everything from directors, musicians, singers, dancers, makeup men etc., all are the villagers themselves.

The spirit behind these all cultural activities is clearly seen from the fact that, the villagers contribute in cash as per their capacities for the expenses.

Needless to say Dhawade is typical example of showcase of vibrant and traditional rural life in Dhule district.

=== Dress ===
In Dhawade like elsewhere in Maharashtra; the dress of men as well as women, consists of two pieces, the one covering upper part above waist and the other covering lower part below waist. The dress pattern and the styles differ slightly in men from community to community and the change is more apparent in women. And even in the same community it varies with sex and age. Moreover, attire patterns are different in elderly and young generations. The men wear kurta or sadra or angee that covers the upper part above waist. The elderly men across all the communities wear Dhotar (commonly called Dhoti in Hindi ). Dhotar is white long cloth of generally 4 meters length and 1.2 m. width and worn below waist. Dhotar is typical attire that is wound and tied around the waist with knot of its corner; which certainly requires initial practice. Among the younger generation however, the dhotar is getting rarer. However the educated younger generation no more wears Dhotar. It has taken up to shirts, trouser and paijama or pants. The shirt is locally called kurta or sadra or angee has undergone changes due to changing fashions or styles over the years; so also the material has changed from coarse cotton to synthetics and all sorts of blended fabrics over the time. The shirt is generally half open on the front side from neck to chest having buttons and may be with half or full sleeved. Elderly men can be seen wearing full sleeved shirt called Nehru shirt. In addition above the elderly men wear cap called Gandhi cap.

Women across all castes invariably wear saadi (commonly called Sari in Hindi) and Choli- the country blouse. Again there are two types of saadis, the one with 9 yard length and the other with 6 yards length. The elderly women of old generation prefer 9 yard saadis; whereas the younger generation prefers 6 yard saadis with a parkar (petticoat) underside. The manner of wearing saadi varies considerably from caste to caste. The young and kids wear other Indian and western style attire. Boys wear half or full pant and shirt with or without under wears. Girls wear north Indian style dress, the salwar and kamiz or western style skirt and blouse or shirt.

=== Ornaments ===
In Dhawade, glass beads and glass bangles are profusely worn as the part of ornamental wear, by women of all communities. Ornaments of gold and silver are most commonly worn by women. Women’s ornaments of silver are heavy and rather with rough workmanship. These are generally crafted by the village goldsmith. But now the preferences are seen to be changing and villagers go to city of Dhule where well crafted ornaments available in variety of designs . Gold ornaments are seen only in very rich families; generally the ones having irrigated agriculture land. Gold ornaments are considered as prestige to a family, and are insurance in emergencies and wealth assets. Ornaments of pearls and precious stones are not seen. The false jewellery with bright and sparkling beads and ear-rings available at cheap prices are worn by poor girls and women to satisfy their liking.

Ornaments of men

Men wear gold or silver rings of different styles and designs at times embedded with semiprecious stones. Some men also wear gold chains called sonsakhali around the necks, which are generally taken as indicator of well off financial position. Another ornament worn with kurta or sadra is buttons woven in chain. Now few among the young generation kids and youths wear Kade – an armlet made of copper or brass. Few men wear bhikabali - an ear ring; generally on the right ear . It is notable ornament for the reason that it is worn as accomplishment of Navas – a promise to the almighty for fulfillment of some prayer made to Him. This ornament is made not out of one's own money; but from the money collected from others as donations or gifts. There is similar ornament worn by few men around ankle and is called Bedi. An ornament of bygone years called Kargota is now seen very rarely in this village. Kargota is mostly made of silver and worn round the waist only by men. It is work of fine silver weaving .

Ornaments of women

Among the women, the craze for ornaments of gold is seen increasing with improved incomes since the year 2000. Like other villages in Dhule district, the women of Dhawade can be seen wearing a number of ornaments. For every part of the body from head to toes, there is at least one ornament seen to be worn. Some of the ornaments worn are linked to the marriage status of woman among the Hindus.

For the head and hair, there are hair pins and clips with floral or some other designs. They are mostly of steel or plastic these days. But there were the days when they used to be of silver.

For nose, there is nose ring for girls and nath, nathani and fuli for the adult or married women. Nose rings are simple rings of gold or silver and at times may have a single glass bead. Nath is large sized decorative nose ring with typical shape. It is decorated with pearls on the outer side. The nathani is miniature of form of nath. In the earlier days, especially the elder women used to wear nath on permanent basis. However this tradition of wearing nath is now getting vanished. Nath is now occasionally worn on ceremonial times like marriages and festivals. The communities that wear nath are Hatkar Patil or Kunabi, Mali, Sutar and Nhavi. Fuli is spike like ornament with top studded with sparkling stone. The communities that wear fuli are Gawali, Lohar, Koli, Mahar, Mang, Chambhar and Bhil.

All the above nasal ornaments are worn on the left side nostril to which a fine hole is pearsed. Nostril piercing is generally done in young age below ten years.

For ears, there are varieties of earrings to be seen. Almost every woman and girl wears some kind of earring. The earrings come with or without black and red glass beads. So also, the earrings with real or artificial stones are fashion to wear among the teens. The economic condition and the cultural following of the family as well as the liking and attitude towards the fashionable living dictate the choice. The ornaments worn on ear by women vary according to age group, community and traditions. Older the age, more will be the traditional and ornament of bygone years generally not available in the shops for sale. Such traditional ornaments are got specially prepared. The older women are seen wearing the traditional ornaments locally called as Bugadi, Killu, Dharani, Khutaalaa, Karnful and Hujur. Younger women go for modern day ornaments like ordinary or bead laced ear rings, Dools, Taps, and Tongal. Teenagers wear ordinary rings called Balyaa. Some of these ornaments can be seen, worn on ears singly and collectively.

The mangalasutra is traditionally regarded as an important ornament worn by married Hindu women. It typically consists of gold beads or vatis (small, hemispherical gold elements) interspersed with black glass beads. Its form and design vary across regions and communities. Kumkum, a coloured powder traditionally applied to the forehead, is also associated with marital status in many Hindu communities. Mangalasutras are now available in a variety of gold designs, while silver may be used as a more affordable alternative among women with limited financial means. In some Hindu traditions, widows traditionally refrain from wearing the mangalasutra and kumkum. Other neck ornaments, traditionally made of gold, include Chitaang, Chapalahaar, Ranihaar, Putalya, Mangalpot, Bormaal, Wajratik, Ekdaani, Mohanmaal and Sari. These ornaments vary in design, craftsmanship and style, and may feature elaborate decorative work. Their materials and workmanship can make them expensive.

The hand is laced with silver ornaments except the bangles and rings, which are in gold. The ornaments worn on the upper part arm are Kade, Velya or Vakya, and Baju band. The wrist has the ornaments called as Got and Patlyaa. In some communities, they are worn regularly; but in others, they are for special occasions only. Rings are mostly in gold and rarely in silver. Gold ring are generally of many varieties in size and design. Bangles are invariably in gold. They are also part of marriage gift. Bangles come in variety of designs and artisanship.

Kambarpatta, Kambarband, Aakadaa, and Lachcha are the ornaments for waist.

The ankle and the foot portion are the parts of leg where the ornaments are worn. The ankle may have any one from the list of ornaments consisting of Paijan, Kalla, Tode, Saakhali pattya. The Bele, Masolya and Virode are the ornaments for toe fingers and worn only after marriage.

=== Food and dietary habits ===
The food of the villagers of Dhawade is invariably spicy and hot. The staple food comprises grains of wheat, bajara and jowar with bajara having the major proportion. The grains of bajara and jowar are consumed by way of preparation called Bhakari (thick baked bread). The pulses also form the important part of food. Pulses consumed are horse gram,Toor, Moog, Chawali and Udid.

Nowadays, rice being available in open market and through government controlled Public Distribution System (PDS) is getting popular. Once about three decades ago, use of rice in the menu was regarded as a sign of better living and could not be afforded by all being costly food then. The cooked rice is called Bhaat. Rice is also consumed by way of preparation called Kichadi. Khichadi is prepared from rice and pulses of Toor or Moog with spices, chilly and oil.

Vegetables and pulses are part of the daily menu. They are either grown locally and bought from weekly market of Kusumba or even Dhule. Tomatoes, Brinjals, Onions, Methi, Bhendi (Ladies Fingers), Gawar, Ambaadi, are the vegetables that are grown locally. Potatoes, Cauli flower, are never grown in the village and come from outside.

The Vegetables are cooked into preparation called Bhaji or Shak and eaten with bhakari. Pulses are cooked into preparation called Daal and Aamati. Daal is simple preparation and generally slightly spicy. Aamati has to be very spicy and hot. Both are eaten with bhakari. Daal or aamati are also eaten with cooked rice.

Consumption of fruits like bananas, dalimb, papaya, watermelon, muskmelon and chikkoo is occasional. The other minor and seasonal fruits consumed are Karwand, jambhul, and bor.Bananas, dalimb, papaya and bor are grown locally .

The cooking style and taste differs according to communities but food preparation is invariably spicy and hot. Milk and its products like curd, buttermilk, butter, ghee, form the important part of the diet of vegetarians, as milk is available aplenty in the village.

Consumption of non-vegetarian food is less common. Non-veg food consist s of mutton of eggs, goats and chicken. Fish is less common. Fresh fish is occasional but dried fish called Bombil that comes from outside the village is consumed. The non-vegetarians are not at all regular meat-eaters and the consumption is occasional on celebrations or at times once a week. The major population is strictly vegetarians notable among them are the Brahmin, Gawali and Mali communities.

All villagers take tea in the morning and the afternoon. Use of milk and sugar in tea preparation is profuse.

Kadhi, a preparation from buttermilk, salt and spices is a very favourite item of all villagers in Dhawade. Chatani is another item devoured by the villagers. It is preparation of ground chilli powder and salt. The other favourite items include homemade mango pickles, and paapad. Paapad is eaten either roasted or fried. Paapads are made from Nagali (red millet), Jowar ( white millet), Udid (black gram), Mug ( green gram), and Rice. They come in variety of taste and additives.

The daily meal consists of Bhakar (bread), Bhaji or Daal or both, split onion, and groundnut chutney. All communities in the village take three meals a day. Nyahari (Breakfast) is taken early in the morning before going out on the work generally before 10 o’clock. Afternoon midday meal is taken at about 2 o’clock and dinner at night between 6 and 9 pm. The festivals are celebrated with sweets like Puran poli, puri, shira, khir, fried paapad, kurdai, bhajee / pakoda etc. At the Diwali festival, Karanji, Anararse, Ladoo, Chivada and shev, are prepared. For the Akshay trutiya festival, aamras and puran poli is special menu. Every community has its own preparations for festivals. The Gawali community has its own preparations like Kanola, Kapani, Kadkani, and Khodbalaa...

== Village Facilities ==
=== Drinking water facilities ===
Dhawade has numerous drinking water facilities which are mainly available through a common tap or a common well. There are five wells, two hand pumps and two electric pumps available within the village as drinking water sources.

=== Education facilities ===
Dhawade has one primary school, one secondary school and one senior secondary school within the village. For all higher education, village students have to go to the bigger cities close by. There are also another 32 government funded childcare and mother-care centers (Anganwadi) within the village as part of the Integrated Child Development Services program started by the Indian government to combat child hunger and malnutrition in 1975.

=== Medical facilities ===
Dhawade has few medical facilities present within the village. There are two Ayurvedic dispensaries, one Primary health Sub Centre and three registered private medical practitioners in the village. One is day visitor and two others are local residents. Though they are not highly qualified, they can treat small ailments and refer patients to Dhule in case of major disease.

=== Communication facilities ===
Dhawade has its own post office but there are no telegraph or telephone facilities within the village. The boom in mobile phones in India has also caught up with Dhawade. It is now a common household item. The year 2009, saw erection of two mobile towers in the village which speaks for the number of mobile phones used by the village. It is estimated that about 3000+ phones are in use.

== Transport ==
=== Rail ===
Dhawade has no railway station of its own, the closest railway station is Dhule which is 20 km from the village.

=== Road ===
Dhawade is connected by the Maharashtra State Road Transport Corporation (M.S.R.T.C) Buses that ply between Dhule, Kusumba & Malegaon. A number of private auto rickshaws and jeeps ply between Dhawade to Kusumba and towards Malegaon. They are mostly operated by self-employed youth of village. Dhawade boasts to have about half a dozen tractors and same number of trucks. They are used to transport agricultural produce- Cotton, Onions, Ground nut, cereals etc. to markets at Dhule, Jalgaon, Lasalgaon (Dist. Nashik), Solapur, Surat, Bharuch, Bhopal, Indore etc. Tractors are used for agricultural works.

=== Air ===
Dhawade has no airport of its own, the closest airport is at Dhule.

== See also ==
- Dhule City
- Dhule District
- List of villages in Dhule District
- List of districts of Maharashtra
- Maharashtra
