= State Highway 190 (Maharashtra) =

Road in Maharashtra, India

State Highway 190

Route information
- Maintained by MSRDC
- Length: 65 km (40 mi)

Major junctions
- From: Malkapur
- Via Bodwad
- To: Nasirabad

Location
- Country: India
- State: Maharashtra
- Districts: Buldhana, Jalgaon

Highway system
- Roads in India; Expressways; National; State; Asian; State Highways in Maharashtra

Maharashtra State Highway No. 190, commonly referred to as MH SH 190, is a normal short length state highway that runs from Malkapur in Buldhana District to Nasirabad in Jalgaon District. The total length of the Highway is 65 km.

== Summary ==
This Highway is one of the important road for Buldhana District & Jalgaon District. The highway starts from Malkapur with junction of MH SH 176, it passes through Bodwad City and Kurhe Town and ends at Nasirabad with Junction of NH-6. It is also a parallel option for Bypassing the heavy traffic of NH-6 also helpful in saving some kilometers instead of traveling through National Highway 6 (India, old numbering).

== See also ==
- List of state highways in Maharashtra
