= State Highway 151 (Maharashtra) =

Road in Maharashtra, India

State Highway 151

Route information
- Maintained by MSRDC
- Length: 135 km (84 mi)

Major junctions
- North end: Barshi, Solapur
- National Highway 9 at Bale; National Highway 13 at Solapur; National Highway 211 at Solapur.
- South end: Akkalkot, Solapur

Location
- Country: India
- State: Maharashtra
- Districts: Solapur
- Primary destinations: Vairag – Solapur

Highway system
- Roads in India; Expressways; National; State; Asian; State Highways in Maharashtra

Maharashtra State Highway 151, commonly referred to as SH 151, is a state highway that runs south through Solapur district in the state of Maharashtra. This state highway touches the cities of Barshi – Vairag – Solapur – Akkalkot and then proceeds south towards Maharashtra-Karnataka state border.

== Summary ==
In Solapur district this highway is also known as Barshi-Solapur-Akkalkot-Dudhani Road. During the Fifth Five-Year Plan a provision of Rs. 22.46 lakhs has been made for the improvement of this road with some minor bridges. Besides, Rs. 4.75 lakhs have also been sanctioned for a bridge on this road across the river Bori near Umarage.

This road emanates from Miraj-Pandharpur-Latur State highway at Barshi. Its total length in the district is 135 kilometres. The road runs towards south up to Solapur and then south-eastwards up to Dudhani. The road passes through Barshi, Solapur North, Solapur South and Akkalkot talukas. Its surface up to Solapur is black-topped and it is motorable throughout the year except for some interruptions during heavy rains. The entire length of the road up to Akkalkot is black-topped beyond which it is water-bound macadam. The road is motorable throughout the year except some obstructions at Bori river near Umarge village during the monsoon.

== Route description ==
Below is a brief summary of the route followed by this state highway.

=== Solapur District ===
==== Barshi Taluka ====
This highway starts from Barshi City in Barshi Taluka of Solapur District and proceeds South East towards Akkalkot. After Travelling for another 34.6 km (21.5 mi), it exits Barshi Taluka after crossing Shelgaon village and enters the Solapur North Taluka.

==== Solapur North Taluka ====
Once this highway enters Solapur North taluka, it travels for another 30.4 km (18.9 mi) where merges in to National Highway 9 at Bale village and enters Solapur city. It travels with National Highway 9 for 4.4 km (2.7 mi) and inside Solapur city it branches off south wards to continue towards Akkalkot. After travelling for 9.5 km (5.9 mi) it exits Solapur North Taluka just before Kumbhari Village and enters Solapur South taluka.

==== Solapur South Taluka ====
After Kumbhari village this highway travels for another 16.7 km (10.4 mi) and exits Solapur South taluka just before entering Karjal village and enters Akkalkot Taluka.

==== Akkalkot Taluka ====
After crossing Karjal village this highway travels for another 9.9 km (6.2 mi) where State Highway 154 merges in to it just outside Akkalkot city. State Highway 154 travels with this highway for another 0.9 km (0.56 mi) to enter Akkalkot city and then branches off north to continue towards Osmanabad district whereas this highway continues south-east. Inside Akkalkot city after another 0.02 km (0.012 mi) State Highway 162 starts off from this highway and then continues north east towards Beed district, while this highway turns southwards towards Maharashtra-Karnataka state border near Dudhani village. This highway ends just near Dudhani village at Maharashtra-Karnataka state border, after traveling for 26.3 km (16.3 mi). From this point it continues in to Karnataka State.

== Major junctions ==
The following roads either emanate from it or are crossed by it. This list has been separated by district and talukas for easy reading.

=== National highways ===
1. NH 9 at Bale village
2. NH 13 at Solapur city
3. NH 211 at Solapur city

=== State highways ===
1. State Highway 67 at Barshi city.
2. State Highway 77 at Barshi city.
3. State Highway 150 at Vairag village.
4. State Highway 154 at Akkalkot city.
5. State Highway 162 at Akkalkot city.

== Connections ==
This highway touches the following important places in its stretch. All the list has been separated by district and talukas for easy reading. Also in each table, the distance of the place from important places in the route of this highway are also mentioned.

=== Solapur District ===
Taluka	Name	Distance		
Taluka	Name	Barshi	Solapur	Akkalkot
Barshi	Barshi city	0 km (0 mi)	69.4 km (43.1 mi)	106.4 km (66.1 mi)
Barshi	Soundare village	4.5 km (2.8 mi)	64.9 km (40.3 mi)	101.9 km (63.3 mi)
Barshi	Pangaon village	11.3 km (7.0 mi)	58.1 km (36.1 mi)	95.1 km (59.1 mi)
Barshi	Manegaon village	20 km (12 mi)	49.4 km (30.7 mi)	86.4 km (53.7 mi)
Barshi	Vairag village	22.6 km (14.0 mi)	46.8 km (29.1 mi)	83.8 km (52.1 mi)
Barshi	Raleras village	29 km (18 mi)	40.4 km (25.1 mi)	77.4 km (48.1 mi)
Barshi	Shelgaon village	34.6 km (21.5 mi)	69.4 km (43.1 mi)	71.8 km (44.6 mi)
Solapur North	Darphal (Gavdi) village	39.2 km (24.4 mi)	30.2 km (18.8 mi)	67.2 km (41.8 mi)
Solapur North	Wadala village	44 km (27 mi)	25.4 km (15.8 mi)	62.4 km (38.8 mi)
Solapur North	Nannaj village	48.8 km (30.3 mi)	20.6 km (12.8 mi)	57.6 km (35.8 mi)
Solapur North	Karamba village	57 km (35 mi)	12.4 km (7.7 mi)	49.4 km (30.7 mi)
Solapur North	Gulwanchi village	58.9 km (36.6 mi)	10.5 km (6.5 mi)	47.5 km (29.5 mi)
Solapur North	Bale village	65 km (40 mi)	4.4 km (2.7 mi)	106.4 km (66.1 mi)
Solapur North	Solapur city	69.4 km (43.1 mi)	0 km (0 mi)	41.4 km (25.7 mi)
Solapur South	Kumbhari village	78.9 km (49.0 mi)	9.5 km (5.9 mi)	27.5 km (17.1 mi)
Solapur South	Togaralli village	84.6 km (52.6 mi)	15.2 km (9.4 mi)	21.8 km (13.5 mi)
Solapur South	Limbi Chincholi village	87.9 km (54.6 mi)	18.5 km (11.5 mi)	18.5 km (11.5 mi)
Solapur South	Valsang village	91.9 km (57.1 mi)	22.5 km (14.0 mi)	14.5 km (9.0 mi)
Akkalkot	Karjal village	95.6 km (59.4 mi)	26.2 km (16.3 mi)	10.8 km (6.7 mi)
Akkalkot	Akkalkot city	106.4 km (66.1 mi)	37 km (23 mi)	0 km (0 mi)
Akkalkot	Umarge village	112 km (70 mi)	42.6 km (26.5 mi)	5.6 km (3.5 mi)
Akkalkot	Maindargi village	120 km (75 mi)	50.6 km (31.4 mi)	13.6 km (8.5 mi)
Akkalkot	Binjge village	125.4 km (77.9 mi)	56 km (35 mi)	19 km (12 mi)
Akkalkot	Sangogi village	127.3 km (79.1 mi)	57.9 km (36.0 mi)	20.9 km (13.0 mi)
Akkalkot	Ruddewadi village	129.6 km (80.5 mi)	60.2 km (37.4 mi)	23.2 km (14.4 mi)
Akkalkot	Dudhani village	135 km (84 mi)	65.6 km (40.8 mi)	28.6 km (17.8 mi)

== See also ==
- List of state highways in Maharashtra
