= Nimgul =

Village in Maharashtra

- village
- Location in Maharashtra, India Nimgul (India)
- Coordinates: 21°23′36″N 74°31′26″E
- Country: India
- State: Maharashtra
- Region: West India
- Division: Nashik Division
- District: Dhule
- Talukas: Sindkheda

Languages
  - Official: Marathi
- Time zone: UTC+5:30 (IST)
- Postal code: 425408
- Nearest city: Dondaicha

Nimgul is a small village in the state of Maharashtra, India. It is located in the Sindkheda taluka of Dhule District.

== Location ==
Nimgul is located on the Maharashtra Major State Highway 1 (MH MSH 1) at . It is located on the bank of the Tapi River and the Ahirani language is mostly used by villagers.

== See also ==
- Dhule City
- Dhule District
- List of villages in Dhule District
- List of districts of Maharashtra
- Maharashtra
