= Makner =

Village in Malkapur, Maharashtra, India

- Village
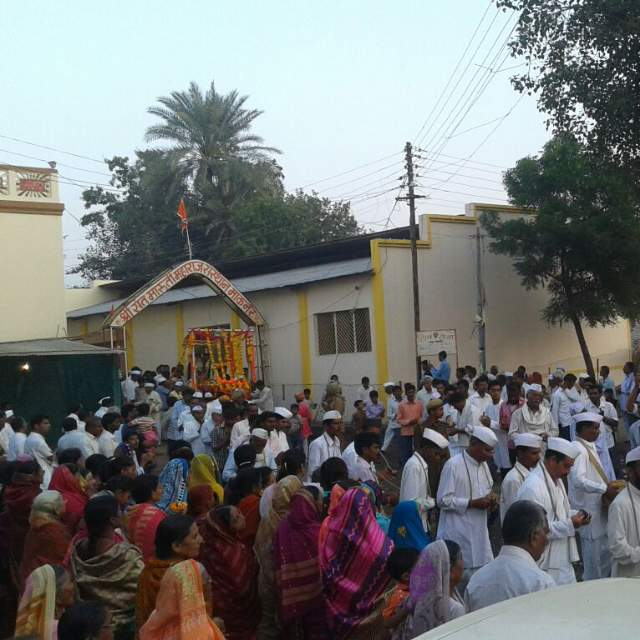
- Shri Sant Maroti Maharaj's Saptah Dindi, Tirthkshetra Makner
- Nickname: Tirthkshetra Makner
- Location in Maharashtra Makner (India)
- Coordinates: 20.832°N 76.254°E
- Country: India
- State: Maharashtra
- District: Buldhana

Government
  - Type: Panchayat
- Elevation: 255 m (837 ft)

Population (2011)
  - Total: 1,396

Languages
  - Official: Marathi, Varhadi
- Time zone: UTC+5:30 (IST)
- PIN: 443102
- Telephone code: 07267
- Vehicle registration: MH 28
- Sex ratio: 1.09 ♂/♀
- Literacy: 83.55%

Makner is a village in Malkapur tehsil of Buldhana district in Maharashtra, India. This is regarded as a holy place, with three major temples dedicated to Hindu saints. Nearby towns are Malkapur on west, Nandura on East.

== Description ==
The town post office Postal Index Number ( PIN code) is 443102. It is located 37 km towards North from District headquarters Buldhana. 9 km from Malkapur. 477 km from State capital Mumbai.

== Transport ==
There is a daily state bus service to and from Malkapur.

The nearest railway station is Malkapur railway station, on the Howrah–Nagpur–Mumbai line.

== Politics ==
- Sarpanch (Makner) : Aashabai Tejrao Wanare
- Member Loksabha (Raver Region) : Raksha Khadse, (Bhartiya Janta Party)
- Member Vidhansabha (Malkapur and Nandura Region): Shri Rajesh Ekade, (Indian National Congress)

== Schools ==
- Zp Mar Pri School, Makner
- Aadarsha Vidyalaya, Umali
- M.S.M English School, Malkapur
- Navneet English School, Malkapur
