= Virdel =

Village in Maharashtra

Coordinates: 21.324°N 74.00°E

Virdel is a village in Sindkheda Taluka, Dhule district of Maharashtra, India. The taluka headquarters is 7.3 km away, and district headquarters Dhule is 48 km from town.

Virdel also has a railway station by the named Virdel Road. The station code is VRD. Virdel station falls on Nandurbar to Jalgaon branch line.

Religious places 1) Sunni Jama Masjid Chowk 2) Viththal Mandir Chowk 3) Maroti Mandir Chowk 4) 18 Patti Chowk 5) Koli Wada 6) Wadar Wada 5) Chambhar Wada 6) Kumbhar Wada 7) Maroti Mandeer Chowk 8) Aadivasi Vasti No.1 9) Aadivasi Vasti No.2 10) Vighnharta Nagar 11) Mali Wada 12) gram Panchayat chowk 13) bhagva chowk
