= Aadiwasi Janjagruti =

Indian non-profit organization

- Founded: 2017
- Type: Non-profit organization
- Location: Dhadgaon, Nandurbar, Maharashtra
- Website: aadiwasijanjagruti.org

Aadiwasi Janjagruti is an initiative by Ulgulan for Social Change Foundation, which is working on Social Justice, awareness, and entitlements in Dhadgaon block of Nandurbar Maharashtra through mobile video films. It allows tribal people to highlight their issues in Pawari, Bhilori and Aahrani language by using citizen Journalism. Initially started in Dhadgaon block of Nandurbar districts it now working for entire districts.

== History ==
Aadiwasi Janjagruti was initiated by Nitesh Bhardwaj in 2017 as a project while he was working as SBI Youth for India fellow. Prior to this project he has started a college newspaper.

== How it works ==
Volunteers from different villages make short films, informative videos or news in local languages entirely on their mobile phones. Once produced the team with the help of their volunteer screen these videos in different village meetings on mobile projectors. They also share these videos on different social media platforms. During COVID-19 pandemic they made videos on creating awareness and fact check in tribal languages for which they received appreciation on National and International level. In 2022, Aadiwasi Janjagruti was selected as one of the recipients of Google News Equity Funds to strengthen inclusion, further empower a diverse news ecosystem, and specifically support small and medium sized publishers creating original journalism for underrepresented audiences around the world.

== Honors and awards ==
- Social Media for Empowerment Awards 2020-21 under Citizen and Media Journalism Category for establishing a local communication network to address the problems of tribal communities of Nandurbar.
- Winner of 8th National Conference on Social Innovation (Under Tribal Category) organised by Pune International Centre in association with the National Innovation Foundation and the Tata Institute of Social Sciences (TISS).
- Featured as one of the 50 most innovative projects working on SDGs from around the world in SDSN Youth Solution Report 2020.
- In May 2022, a road in Harankhuri Village was named after Aadiwasi Janjagruti for its contribution to the village's development.
- In October 2022, Arjun Pawara and five other volunteers of Aadiwasi Janjagruti won Panchayat elections from Harankhuri-Bhujgaon Group Gram Panchayat.
- Special Mention, Idea Prize 2022, by Agami for the work on Social Justice.
- Winner of 'SBI YFI Sahyog - The Pitch Fest', organised by SBI Foundation.
- Winner of City Champions, Organised by Josh Talks and supported by Omidyar Network India, under Social Edge Award category.
