= State Highway 2 (Maharashtra) =

Road in Maharashtra, India

State Highway 2

Route information
- Maintained by MSRDC

Major junctions
- From: Mhasavad, Nandurbar
- To: Toranmal, Nandurbar

Location
- Country: India
- State: Maharashtra
- Districts: Nandurbar
- Primary destinations: Toranmal

Highway system
- Roads in India; Expressways; National; State; Asian; State Highways in Maharashtra

Maharashtra State Highway 2, (commonly referred to as MH SH 2), is a state highway in northern Maharashtra. This nomenclature is adopted for a short 55-kilometer state highway; the route is as follows (includes major villages): Mhasavad – Islampur – Lakkadkot – Ranipur – Nagziri – Toranmal. It connects the above-mentioned villages to the tehsil headquarter at Shahada. The traffic on the route being limited, it's designed for light two-way traffic only.

== Route description ==
Below is the brief summary of the route followed by this state highway.

== Major junctions ==
=== National Highways ===
This highway does not intersect with any National Highways.

=== State Highways ===
- Major State Highway 1 at Mhasavad village, Shahada Taluka, Nandurbar District

== Connections ==
Many villages, cities and towns in various districts are connected by this state highway.

== See also ==
- List of state highways in Maharashtra
