= Bilgaon =

- Village
- Location in Maharashtra, India
- Coordinates: 21.89910°N 74.31769°E
- Country: India
- State: Maharashtra
- District: Nandurbar

Government
  - Type: Gram Panchayat

Area
  - Total: 3.62 km^{2} (1.40 sq mi)
- Elevation: 367 m (1,204 ft)

Population (2011)
  - Total: 1,840
  - Density: 508/km^{2} (1,320/sq mi)

Languages
  - Official: Marathi
- Time zone: UTC+5:30 (IST)
- PIN: 425432

Bilgaon is a village in the Dhadgaon Tehsil of Nandurbar district, in Maharashtra in western India. It consists of 12 hamlets. The population recorded in the 2011 Census of India was 1840.

Notably, a micro hydro was built in 2003 mostly with the help of voluntary labour by the tribals (Shramdaan); effects of the Sardar Sarovar Dam caused it to be washed away.

The Bollywood film Swades was based on the village. Aadiwasi Janjagruti a community media based social project operated in Dhadgaon Tehsil is making a documentary on it
