= Dumkhal =

- village
- Location in Gujarat, India Dumkhal (India)
- Coordinates: 21.7396°N 73.8449°E
- Country: India
- State: Gujarat
- District: Narmada

Population (2007)
  - Total: 1,285

Languages
  - Official: Gujarati, Hindi
- Time zone: UTC+5:30 (IST)
- Vehicle registration: GJ
- Nearest city: Bharuch
- Lok Sabha constituency: Narmada
- Website: gujaratindia.com

Dumkhal is a village in Narmada district of Gujarat, India. The population is 1285. The Maharashtra Major State Highway 1 ends at this village. The nearby sanctuary of Shoolpaneshwar is also called "Dumkhal Wildlife Sanctuary."
