= Samudrapur =

- town
- Location in Maharashtra, India
- Coordinates: 20°39′N 78°58′E
- Country: India
- State: Maharashtra

Languages
  - Official: Marathi
- Time zone: UTC+5:30 (IST)
- Postal code: 442305

Samudrapur is a town and the headquarters of Samudrapur tehsil in Hinganghat subdivision of Wardha district in Nagpur revenue Division in the Vidarbha region in the state of Maharashtra, India. Jamb town is located in Samudrapur tehsil.

== Demographics ==
Year	Male	Female	Total Population	Change	Religion (%)							
Year	Male	Female	Total Population	Change	Hindu	Muslim	Christian	Sikhs	Buddhist	Jain	Other religions and persuasions	Religion not stated
2001	60002	55615	115617	-	84.886	1.165	0.078	0.094	13.623	0.079	0.024	0.050
2011	60588	56450	117038	1.229	85.472	1.137	0.074	0.138	12.914	0.065	0.132	0.067
