= State Highway 1 (Maharashtra) =

Road in Maharashtra, India

State Highway 1

Route information
- Maintained by MSRDC

Major junctions
- From: Shahada, Nandurbar
- To: Amalner, Jalgaon

Location
- Country: India
- State: Maharashtra
- Districts: Nandurbar, Dhule, Jalgaon
- Primary destinations: Shahada, Sangvi, Lasur, Amalner

Highway system
- Roads in India; Expressways; National; State; Asian; State Highways in Maharashtra

Maharashtra State Highway 1, commonly referred to as MH SH 1, is a normal state highway that runs south through Nandurbar, Dhule and Jalgaon districts in the state of Maharashtra. This state highway touches numerous cities and villages VIZ. Shahada, Sangvi, Lasur and Amalner.

== Route description ==
Below is the brief summary of the route followed by this state highway.

=== Jalgaon District ===
==== Chopda Taluka ====
This Highway also covered the areas of chopda Taluka. In Chopda Taluka The villages that are covered under this highway are following Budhagaon, Galwade, Hated kH, Galangi and Velode.

== Connections ==
Many villages, cities and towns in various districts are connected by this state highway.
