= D. P. Kothari =

Indian academic

Dwarkadas Prahladadas Kothari

Honorary Adjunct professor VNIT, Nagpur

Vice-Chancellor of VIT University
- In office 2007–2010

Director i/c IIT Delhi
- In office 2006–2006

Deputy Director of IIT Delhi
- In office 2003–2006

Principal of Visvesvaraya National Institute of Technology
- In office 1997–1998

Personal details
- Born: 7 October 1944 (age 82) Bikaner, British India
- Spouse: Shobha Kothari
- Education: BITS, Pilani

Dwarkadas Prahladadas Kothari (born 7 October 1944) is an Indian educationist and professor. He held leadership positions at several engineering institutions in India, including IIT Delhi, Visvesvaraya National Institute of Technology, Nagpur and VIT University, Vellore. Kothari is an IEEE Fellow.

== Early life ==
D.P. Kothari was born in Bikaner, Rajasthan, India. He attended the G. B. M. M. Higher Secondary School in Hinganghat, Maharashtra. He obtained his undergraduate degree in electrical engineering from BITS, Pilani, graduating in 1967. He subsequently obtained his master's degree in power systems from the same institution in 1969, whereupon he continued to pursue his PhD, receiving it in 1975.

== Academic career ==
Kothari has served as an Advisor to the Chancellor at VIT University, Vellore, and prior to that, he was the Head of the Centre for Energy Studies at IIT Delhi (1995–97) and also served as the Principal of Visvesvaraya Regional Engineering College, Nagpur (1997–98). He has also been Director i/c, IIT Delhi (2005) and Deputy Director (Administration), IIT Delhi (2003–06).

Kothari is most popularly known for his contributions to the advancement of engineering education in India. He has published and presented over 842 papers in national and international journals and conferences.

He has authored and co-authored 60 books on subjects such as power systems, electrical machines, transmission systems, and renewable ernegy sources. His research interests include: Optimal Hydro-thermal Scheduling, Unit Commitment, Maintenance Scheduling, Energy Conservation (loss minimisation and voltage control), and Power Quality and Energy Systems Planning and Modelling.

He is currently an honorary adjunct professor in VNIT, Nagpur.

== Awards and honors ==
The University Grants Commission presented him the UGC National Swami Pranavananda Saraswati Award for 2005 on Education for his scholarly contributions. He is the recipient of the National Khosla Lifetime Achievement Award 2005 from the Indian Institute of Technology, Roorkee, National Award for Science and Technology from the Uttar Pradesh government in 2001 and the Eminent Engineering Personality award from the Institution of Engineers (India) for the year 2001. The World Management Congress, New Delhi, gave Kothari the Lifetime Achievement Award for 'Educational Planning and Administration' in December 2009.

== Fellowships ==
- Fellow – IEEE
- Life Fellow – The Institution of Engineers (India)
- Life Membership and Honorary Fellow – Indian Society for Technical Education
- Fellow – Indian National Academy of Sciences, Allahabad
- Fellow – Indian National Academy of Engineering
- Senior Member – CSI
- Fellow – IETE

== Books and research papers ==
- D.P. Kothari and I.J. Nagrath, "Modern Power System Analysis," Tata McGraw Hill, New Delhi, 1980(7 reprints), Second Edition, 1989(25 reprints), Third Edition, 2003(16th reprint 2009); International Edition, McGraw-Hill, Singapore, 2004, McGraw-Hill, New York, 2006, Second Edition, 2007, Third Edition, 2008, Fourth Edition, 2011.
- S.S. Murthy, B.P. Singh, D.P. Kothari and C.S. Jha (Eds)"Electro mechanics Laboratory Manual," Wiley Eastern, New Delhi, 1982.
- D.P. Kothari and I.J. Nagrath, "Electric Machines," Approved by the UGC and published by Tata McGraw Hill, New Delhi with NBT subsidy, First Edition, 1985, (16 Reprints): Second Edition, 1997, (16 Reprints); Third Edition, 2004 (13th reprint 2009). FOURTH EDITION 2010.
- A.K. Mahalanabis, D.P. Kothari and S.I. Ashon, "Computer Aided Power System Analysis and Control," Tata McGraw Hill, New Delhi, 1988, (First Reprint, 1991).
- J. Nanda and D.P. Kothari (Eds.),"Recent Trends in Electric Energy Systems," Prentice Hall of India, New Delhi, 1988.
- C.M. Bhatia and D.P. Kothari (Eds.), "Power Electronics Laboratory Manual," Galgotia Book source, New Delhi, 1988.
- D.P. Kothari and I.J. Nagrath, "Theory and Problems of Electric Machines TMH Outline Series". Tata McGraw Hill, New Delhi, 1991. (Six Reprints) 2nd Edition, 2001(Fifth Reprint, 2003), International Edition, McGraw-Hill, Singapore, 2001, Sigma Series, 2006(4th reprint 2009).
- D.P. Kothari and I.J. Nagrath and, "Power Systems Engineering," Tata McGraw Hill, New Delhi, 1994. (20 Reprints); 2nd edition, 2007 (5th Reprint 2009).
- A. Chakrabarti, D.P. Kothari and A.K. Mukhopadhyay, "Performance, Operation and Control of EHV Transmission Systems," Wheeler Publishing, New Delhi, 1995
- C.S. Indulkar and D.P. Kothari, K. Ramalingam "Power System Transients: A Statistical Approach," Prentice Hall of India, New Delhi, 1996. SECOND EDITION 2010.
- D.P. Kothari and I.J. Nagrath, "Theory and Problems of Basic Electrical Engineering," Prentice Hall of India, New Delhi, 1998.(11th Reprint 2009)
- D.P. Kothari and D.K. Sharma (Eds.), "Energy Engineering : Theory and Practice", S. Chand and Co. Ltd., New Delhi, 2000
- D.P Kothari and I.J. Nagrath, "Basic Electrical Engineering", TMH, New Delhi, 2nd Edn, 2002 (Twentieth Reprint 2009), 3rd Edn,2010.
- D.P. Kothari and J. S. Dhillon, "Power System Optimization", Prentice-Hall of India, 2004.(2nd Edition in Press).
- D.P. Kothari and Anshu Saxena, "Understanding Hypermedia: From Multimedia to Virtual Reality", Prentice-Hall of India, 2004.
- D.P. Kothari, Rakesh Ranjan and K.C. Singhal, "Renewable Energy Sources and Technology", Prentice-Hall of India, 2007. SECOND EDN 2011.
- Akhtar Kalam & D.P. Kothari, "Power System Protection and Communication ", New Age International (P) Limited, Publishers, New Delhi 2010.
- D.P. Kothari and P.M.V. Subba Rao, "Power Generation" in "Springer Handbook of Mechanical Engineering" ed. by Grote, Antonsson, 2009.
- D.P. Kothari, Shailesh Upadhyay and Ujala Shanker, "Renewable Energy Technologies for Cooking: Transforming Rural Lives" IEEE Technology and Society. Fall 2013
