= Jamb, Wardha =

Jamb
- Village
- Interactive map of Jamb
- Coordinates: 20.61674°N 78.93097°E
- Country: India
- State: Maharashtra
- District: Wardha

Government
  - Type: Gram Panchayat

Population (Census 2011)
  - Total: 3,604

Languages
  - Official: Marathi
- Time zone: UTC+5:30 (IST)
- Telephone code: 07151
- Vehicle registration: MH-32
- Nearest city: Hinganghat

Jamb is a town in Samudrapur tehsil in Wardha district in Nagpur Division in the state of Maharashtra, India. It is also known as Jam and more popularly Jam Chaurasta meaning Jam Square. Jamb is located on junction of NH 44 and NH 347A and Jam - Samudrapur State Highway.

Being an important road junction, there are many restaurants and dhabas available there. A medium-sized bus stand is present at which buses to Nagpur, Hyderabad, Chandrapur, Wardha, Sewagram, Samudrapur etc. are available. Nearest railway station is Hinganghat Railway Station.
