= Shoolpaneshwar Wildlife Sanctuary =

Wildlife sanctuary in India

Coordinates: 21.7606223°N 73.7948516°E

- IUCN category IV (habitat/species management area)
- Location within Gujarat Location within India
- Interactive map of Shoolpaneshwar Wildlife Sanctuary
- Location: Gujarat, India
- Area: 607.7 km^{2} (234.6 sq mi)
- Established: 1982

Shoolpaneshwar Wildlife Sanctuary is a protected area in India's Gujarat state, located in the western Satpura Range south of the Narmada River and is 607.7 km^{2} (234.6 sq mi) large. It shares a common boundary with Madhya Pradesh and Maharashtra. It encompasses mixed dry deciduous forest, riverine forest, few pockets of moist teak forest, agricultural fields and two water reservoirs. It was established in 1982.

== Ecosystem ==
The physical aspect is dominated by Rajpipla hills. Dhanmal is the highest peak in this region. The general slope is towards west. The sanctuary has a vast undulating terrain, lush ever pervading greenery, tall canopy, deep valleys, sombre rocks, gentle streams, and waterfalls. All of these are in the Vindhyan and Satpuran ranges.

=== Flora ===
Shoolpaneshwar Wildlife Sanctuary is a part of the North Western Ghats moist deciduous forests ecoregion. The forests are moist deciduous with a few small dry bamboo brakes, a few pockets of moist teak forest in hilly areas, degraded scrub forest, and riverine forest bordering Terav and Narmada Rivers and small water courses.

=== Fauna ===
Shoolpaneshwar Wildlife Sanctuary was initially established for the protection of the sloth bear. A rusty-spotted cat was sighted for the time in 1991.

Shoolpaneshwar Wildlife Sanctuary's herpetofauna includes Indian softshell turtle, Indian flapshell turtle, Bengal monitor, Indian rock python, red sand boa, Indian krait, Russell's viper, Indian chameleon, rock agama, Brooke's house gecko, Yellow-bellied house gecko, oriental garden lizard and a small population of the mugger crocodile. Frogs recorded include Ramanella species, Asian common toad, marbled toad, ornate narrow-mouthed frog, Indian skipping frog, Indian tree frog, green pond frog, Indian bullfrog, cricket frog and Indian burrowing frog

== See also ==
- Arid Forest Research Institute
- Bansda National Park
- Dangs' Forest
- Dumkhal
- Jambughoda Wildlife Sanctuary
- Purna Wildlife Sanctuary
