= Chimthane =

Village in Maharashtra, India

Chimthane Chimthana
- village
- Location in Maharashtra, India Chimthane (India)
- Coordinates: 21.18°N 74.69°E
- Country: India
- State: Maharashtra
- Region: West India
- Division: Nashik Division
- District: Dhule
- Talukas: Sindkheda

Population
  - Total: 20,000

Languages
  - Official: Marathi Ahirani
- Time zone: UTC+5:30 (IST)
- PIN: 425407
- Nearest city: Dhule

Chimthane is a small village in the state of Maharashtra, India. It is located in the Sindkheda taluka of Dhule District in Maharashtra.

== Location ==
Chimthane is located on the Maharashtra Major State Highway 1 (MH MSH 1).

== Transport ==
=== Rail ===
Chimthane does not have its own railway station; the nearest railway station is Sindkheda, 8.5 kilometres (5 mi) away, which is on Jalgaon - Udhna Section of Western Railways.

== See also ==
- Dhule City
- List of villages in Dhule District
- List of districts of Maharashtra
