= Toranmal =

Village in Maharashtra

- Hill Station
- Location in Maharashtra, India Toranmal (India)
- Coordinates: 21.88°N 74.46°E
- Tahsil: Dhadgaon
- State: Maharashtra
- District: Nandurbar

Government
  - Type: Gram Panchayat

Area
  - Total: 41.43 km^{2} (16.00 sq mi)
- Elevation: 1,155 m (3,789 ft)

Languages
  - Official: Marathi Hindi
- Time zone: UTC+5:30 (IST)
- PIN: 425409
- Telephone code: 02565

Toranmal is a hill station in the Gram Panchayat of the Nandurbar district in the Indian state of Maharashtra. One can reach through Shahada. It is a hill station located in the Satpura Range. Its Gorakhnath Temple is the site of a Yatra attended by thousands of devotees on Mahashivratri. On that occasion pilgrims walk barefoot for days from surrounding areas in the Nandurbar district but also from Maharashtra, Madhya Pradesh and Gujarat. Toranmal is the prominent hill station of Khandesh region.

Toranmal is located between latitude 21 degrees, 54 minutes N, and longitude 74 degrees, 27 minutes E and 74 degrees, 30 minutes E, at the height of 1,150 metres (3,770 ft) above mean sea level.

Toranmal Wildlife Sanctuary is located in the area. In 1997, researchers found the forest owlet (Heteroglaux blewitti), then considered extinct, in the sanctuary.

Every year, the Gorakhnath Temple hosts Maha Shivratri celebrations.

== Approach ==
Toranmal is about 55 kilometres (34 mi) from Shahada city which is about 305 kilometres (190 mi) from Nashik and about 200 kilometres (120 mi) from Surat. Nearest railway station is Nandurbar which is about 76 kilometres (47 mi) and Dondaicha is about 75 kilometres (47 mi) km from Shahada Town. However, for approach from Mumbai 510 kilometres (320 mi), train station to approach is Dhule (90 km) or Chalisgaon (145 km.). Nearest Airport is Surat.
