= Kurha =

- Village
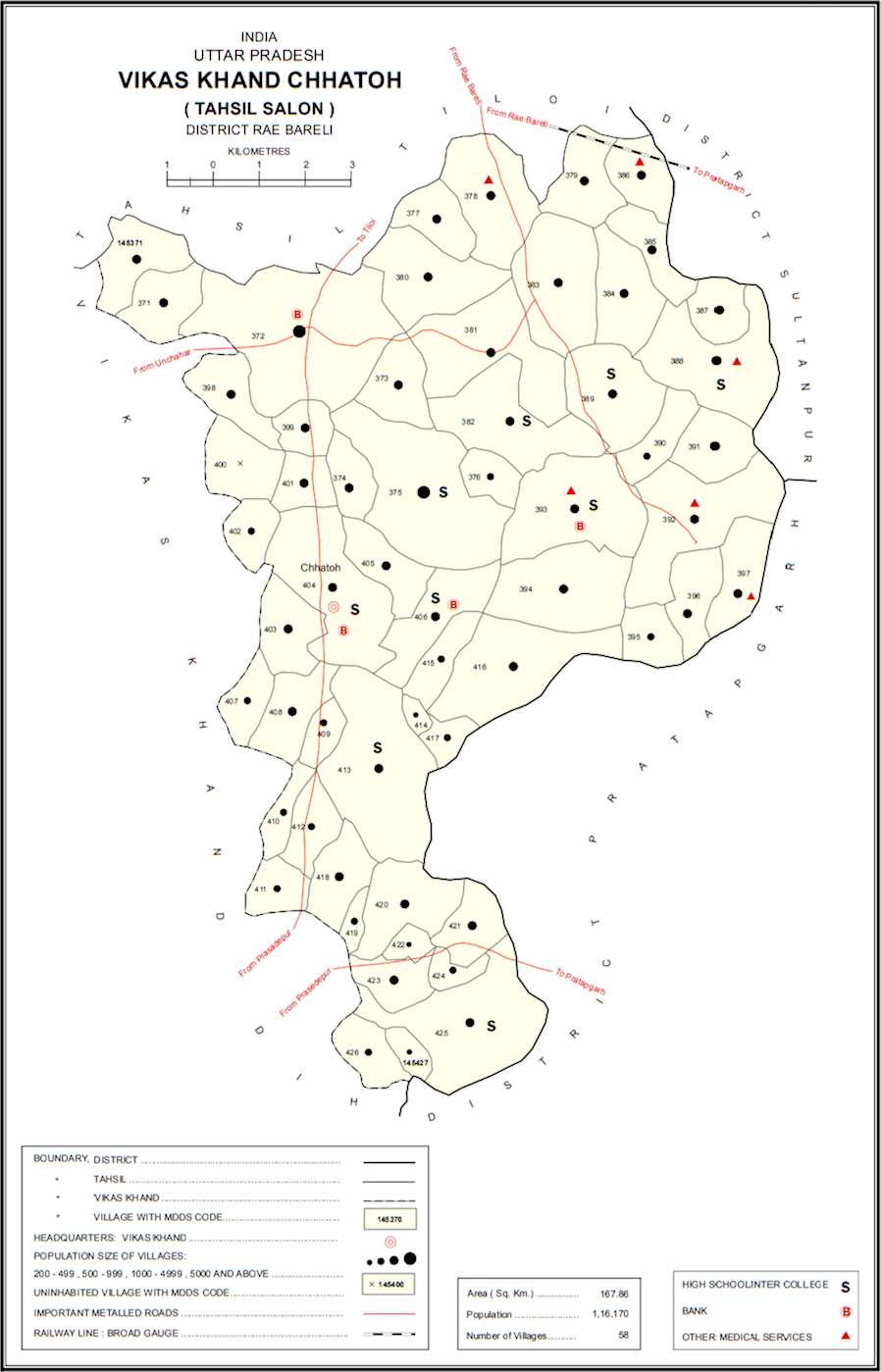
- Map showing Kurha (#388) in Chhatoh CD block

- Location in Uttar Pradesh, India
- Coordinates: 26.202518°N 81.609123°E
- Country India: India
- State: Uttar Pradesh
- District: Raebareli

Area
  - Total: 5.558 km^{2} (2.146 sq mi)

Population (2011)
  - Total: 3,412
  - Density: 613.9/km^{2} (1,590/sq mi)

Languages
  - Official: Hindi
- Time zone: UTC+5:30 (IST)
- Vehicle registration: UP-35

Kurha is a village in Chhatoh block of Rae Bareli district, Uttar Pradesh, India. It is located 12 km from Raebareli, the district headquarters. As of 2011, Kurha has a population of 3,412 people, in 565 households. It has 3 primary schools and 1 healthcare facility. The village belongs to the nyaya panchayat of Hajipur.

The 1951 census recorded Kurha as comprising 15 hamlets, with a population of 1,141 people (595 male and 546 female), in 494 households and 448 physical houses. The area of the village was given as 1,294 acres. 26 residents were literate, 25 male and 1 female. The village was listed as belonging to the pargana of Rokha and the thana of Nasirabad.

The 1961 census recorded Kurha as comprising 14 hamlets, with a total population of 1,428 people (723 male and 705 female), in 287 households and 282 physical houses. The area of the village was given as 1,294 acres and it had a post office at that point.

The 1981 census recorded Kurha as having a population of 1,601 people, in 410 households, and having an area of 523.26 hectares. The main staple foods were listed as wheat and rice.

The 1991 census recorded Kurha as having a total population of 2,070 people (1,063 male and 1,007 female), in 400 households and 399 physical houses. The area of the village was listed as 528 hectares. Members of the 0-6 age group numbered 367, or 17.7% of the total; this group was 53% male (194) and 47% female (173). Members of scheduled castes made up 32.7% of the village's population, while no members of scheduled tribes were recorded. The literacy rate of the village was 26% (423 men and 116 women). 890 people were classified as main workers (598 men and 292 woman), while 2 people were classified as marginal workers (both women); the remaining 1,178 residents were non-workers. The breakdown of main workers by employment category was as follows: 601 cultivators (i.e. people who owned or leased their own land); 237 agricultural labourers (i.e. people who worked someone else's land in return for payment); 0 workers in livestock, forestry, fishing, hunting, plantations, orchards, etc.; 0 in mining and quarrying; 1 household industry worker; 5 workers employed in other manufacturing, processing, service, and repair roles; 5 construction workers; 21 employed in trade and commerce; 0 employed in transport, storage, and communications; and 20 in other services.
