= SBI Youth for India =

Indian rural youth fellowship program

SBI Youth For India
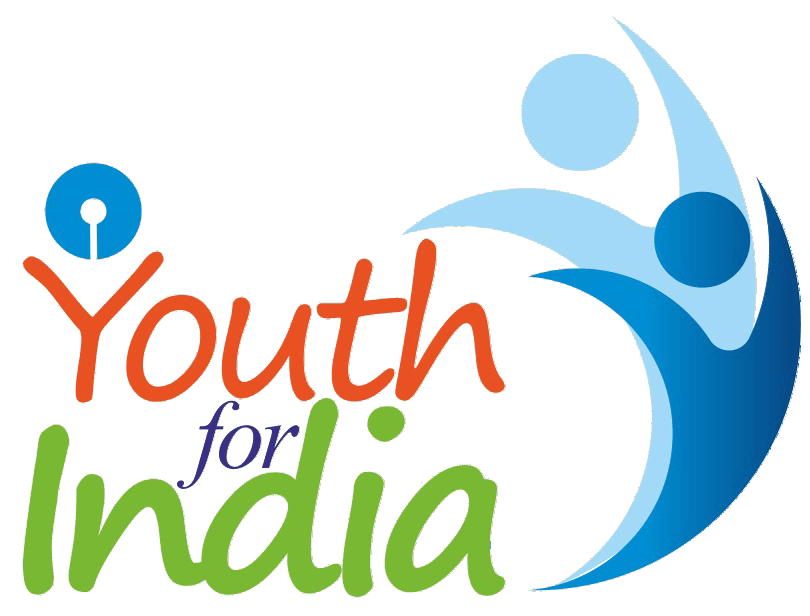
- Founded: 2011
- Purpose: Education, Food Security, Environmental Protection, self-governance, Health, Social Entrepreneurship, Alternate Energy, Technology, Water, Rural Livelihoods, Traditional Crafts, Self Governance, Women's Empowerment
- Location: Mumbai, Maharashtra, India
- Key people: Sanjay Prakash (MD & CEO, SBI Foundation); Jagannath Sahoo (President & COO, SBI Foundation)
- Website: youthforindia.org

SBI Youth for India (SBI YFI) is an Indian rural fellowship programme initiated, funded and managed by the State Bank of India (SBI) in partnership with non-governmental organizations (NGOs). Fellows work with the NGOs on grassroot development projects.

The goal of the fellowship is to introduce social entrepreneurship and the social sector to youth.

== History ==
The SBI Youth for India Fellowship was launched on 1 March 2011, in partnership with three NGOs: M S Swaminathan Research Foundation, BAIF Development Research Foundation and Seva Mandir.

The program has been recognised by A. P. J. Abdul Kalam (ex-President of India), Ratan Tata (chairman, Tata Group), Duvvuri Subbarao (Governor, Reserve Bank of India), O. P. Bhatt (Chairman, State Bank of India), and M. S. Swaminathan (the proponent of the Green Revolution in India) amongst others.

The fellows work on projects in 12 thematic program areas: education, food security, environmental protection, health, alternative energy, rural livelihoods, traditional crafts, self-governance, social entrepreneurship, women's empowerment, water, and technology.

== International presence ==
During its history, SBI YFI fellows have come from the following countries:

- India (since 2011)
- Bhutan (2023-)
- Nepal (2023-)

== Fellows ==
Fellows range between 21–32 years of age, and are all graduates or postgraduates. Most have an engineering or management background. Fellows have worked in sectors such as information technology, education, infrastructure, non-profit, and healthcare, and at organisations such as Tata Group, Capgemini, IBM, and Mindtree.

The flagship batch of the fellowship had 27 fellows who worked for a year on various projects in the areas of agricultural supply chain and linkages, education, public policy and awareness, rural tourism, tribal development and environment in eight states and union territories (namely, Rajasthan, Maharashtra, Kerala, Orissa, Gujarat, Karnataka, Tamil Nadu and Puducherry).

The August Cohort of the 13th Batch started their Fellowship in August 2025.

== Partner NGOs ==
1. BAIF Development Research Foundation
2. Dhan Foundation
3. ECS
4. Gram Vikas
5. NBJK
6. Chirag
7. Seva Mandir
8. Sewa Bharat
9. MSSRF
10. AKRSP-I
11. Barefoot College SWRC
12. Action for Social Advancement (ASA)
13. Samaj Pragati Sahayog (SPS)
14. Urmul
15. The Ant

== SBI YFI Conclave ==
The SBI YFI Conclave is a 2-day program that includes partner NGO meetings, showcasing the work of alumni, panel discussions, and networking..Recent event concluded in Guwahati with six ventures receiving the funding.
