= Vairag =

Village in Maharashtra, India

- Village
- Location in Maharashtra, India Vairag (India)
- Coordinates: 18°3′0″N 75°48′0″E
- Country: India
- State: Maharashtra
- District: Solapur

Population (2011)
  - Total: 19,970

Languages
  - Official: Marathi
- Time zone: UTC+5:30 (IST)
- PIN: 413402
- Lok Sabha constituency: 40 osmanabad
- Vidhan Sabha constituency: 246 Barshi

Vairag is a town in Barshi Taluka of Solapur district in Maharashtra, India. The village is located centrally between Solapur and Barshi.

Its population was approximately 19,970 as per 2011 census.

Vairag is a village with the second biggest population in Maharashtra. The village has a nagar panchayat. Incorporates the main village and 56 small villages and hamlets inside its legal boundary.

The village also has one of the big sugar factories in Solapur district at Bhogawati. The village also has growing MIDC owned industrial park.

== Geography ==
Sasure (5 km), Ghanegaon (5 km), Sarjapur (5 km), Ladole (6 km), Irle (6 km), Tulshidas Nagar (2 km), Manegav (2 km) Ratanjan (5 km) are the nearby villages.

Vairag is surrounded by Mohol Taluka on the south, Osmanabad Taluka and Tuljapur Taluka towards the east, and Madha Taluka towards the west.

Barshi, Osmanabad, Tuljapur, Solapur, Pandharpur, Mohol, and Kurduvadi are the nearest towns and cities to the village.

== History ==
Vairag is full of ancient temples. The village is well known for its Aanand bazaar and livestock (bullock) market. The first Prime Minister of India Pandit Jawaharlal Nehru also visited the village.

The village hosts a large fair (Jatra) in honour of Shri. Santanath Maharaj carnival (Yatra) in August, on the day of Narali-Pournima. Public entertainment on day includes Lezim, Jazz-Pathak, Dhol-Tasha etc.

== Transport ==
=== By rail ===
There is no railway station near to Vairag in less than 10 km. Solapur Jn Rail Way Station (near to Solapur), Barsi Town Rail Way Station (near to Barshi), Solapur Junction Railway Station (near Solapur), Umed Railway Station (near Osmanabad), Uplai Railway Station (near to Barshi) are the railway stations reachable from nearby towns.

== Public amenities ==
=== Health ===
The village has a Rural Health Training Center.

=== Education ===
The town is well known in the region for its educational institutions, and nearby villages depend upon these educational facilities.

==== Primary and secondary education ====
- Anuradhatai institute secondary high school
- Arnav modern high school
- Navin marathi school
- Shardadevi high school
- Tulshidas Jadhav Prashala
- Vidhya mandir girls school
- Vidhya mandir high school

==== Tertiary Education ====
- Anuradhatai institute BA and BEd College
- Indira college of engineering
- Polytechnique College of engineering
- Sai Ayurvedha BAMS College
- Suvarnlata Gandhi college of arts
