= Kherda =

Village in Maharashtra

- village
- Location in Maharashtra, India Kherda (India)
- Coordinates: 20°53′16.24″N 76°20′0.68″E
- Country: India
- State: Maharashtra
- District: Buldhana

Government
  - Body: Gram panchayat

Languages
  - Official: Marathi
- Time zone: UTC+5:30 (IST)
- ISO 3166 code: IN-MH
- Vehicle registration: MH-
- Coastline: 0 kilometres (0 mi)
- Avg. summer temperature: 42–48 °C (108–118 °F)
- Website: maharashtra.gov.in

Kherda is a village in Buldhana district, Maharashtra, India.

- 7 km away from Jalgaon (Jamod).
- 40 km away from Shegaon.
- Lies in Buldhana District of Maharashtra.
- Village is divided into two parts by the river ‘Nipani’ viz Kherda Bujrukh and Kherda Khurd.
- Temple of Kapilmuni Maharaj in Kherda khurd. In every year at Sankranti there is arrangement of mela. At the roof of the temple there are two trees: one is of neem (Azadiracta indica) and other is of Pimple. The specialty of these trees is that they never dry and they never grow larger than their normal size.
- Temple of Sawangi Maharaj lies 2 km from Kherda and has received many visitors.
- Near about 90% of people are depend on farming and allied businesses.
- The main crop taken is cotton, Jowar, Mung, etc. In irrigated areas, fruits and vegetables are grown.

Political

- In Kherda (Kh) Rangarao Deshmukh is taluca President of NCP in Jalgaon.
- In Kherda (bk) Pravin Bhopale is Sabhapti of jalgaon jamod; M.R. Wankhade cotton market, Dilip Rathi Ex. Sarpanch.

Grampanchayat

- Kherda (kh) : Sarpanch- bashkar umarkar
- Kherda (Bk) : Sarpanch- prabhudas bombatkar
