= Dhadgaon =

- Town
- Nickname: Akrani
- Location within Maharashtra
- Coordinates: 21.824237°N 74.216874°E
- Taluka: Dhadgaon
- District: Nandurbar
- State: Maharashtra
- Country: India

Area
  - Total: 1,578.89 km^{2} (609.61 sq mi)
- Elevation: 367 m (1,204 ft)

Population
  - Total: 1,253 (2,011)
  - Density: 0.7936/km^{2} (2.055/sq mi)
- Postal code: 425414

Dhadgaon (also known as Akrani or Akrani Mahal) is a Nagar Panchayat in Nandurbar district, Maharashtra, India. The name Akrani is derived from a local queen "Akka Rani", Rani meaning queen in Marathi. Nandurbar district has five more tehsils viz. Akkalkuwa, Taloda, Shahada, Nandurbar and Navapur. The tehsil is surrounded by Madhya Pradesh state on north and east, Shahada and Talode tehsils on south and Akkalkuwa on west. Maharashtra State Highway 1 (MSH-1) passes through the tehsil along with Akkalkuwa and Shahada. The hill station and tourist attraction Toranmal is located in this tehsil.

Bilgaon is a village in Dhadgaon tehsil known for its developmental work and serving as an inspiration for the film Swades.

== Demography ==
The total population of Dhadgaon (Akrani) sub-district, as per 2001 India census was 1,36,504. There were 67,967 males and 68537 females. As per India census 2011 population was 1,95,754 out of which 97,902 were males and 97,852 were females.

Year	Male	Female	Total Population	Change	Religion (%)							
Year	Male	Female	Total Population	Change	Hindu	Muslim	Christian	Sikhs	Buddhist	Jain	Other religions and persuasions	Religion not stated
2001	67967	68537	136504	-	96.536	0.531	0.349	0.015	0.102	0.006	2.215	0.248
2011	97902	97852	195754	0.434	98.299	0.517	0.149	0.008	0.049	0.007	0.431	0.540
