= Gaigaon =

Village in Maharashtra

Gaigaon Manali
- village
- Location in Maharashtra, India Gaigaon (India)
- Coordinates: 20°43′N 76°53′E
- Country: India
- State: Maharashtra
- District: Akola

Population
  - Total: 7,000

Languages
  - Official: Marathi
- Time zone: UTC+5:30 (IST)
- PIN: 444109
- Telephone code: 07257
- Vehicle registration: MH-30
- Coastline: 0 kilometres (0 mi)
- Nearest city: Akola city
- Sex ratio: 70/100 ♂/♀
- Literacy: 54%
- Lok Sabha constituency: Akola
- Website: akola.nic.in

Gaigaon is a village near Akola district about 12–15 km away. It is famous for Hazrat Makhdum (R.A) Dargah, Jama Masjid, Ganesh Temple, manali, and the depot of Hindustan petroleum products, Indian oil products & Bharat petroleum products and national military school, which is one of the great opportunities for education in Akola district. Gaigaon has a rail line of Central Railway. Gaigaon is also known as "Gaigaon Railway". It has a panchmukhi Mahadeo temple at the center of the village. It is situated at a latitude = 20.7166667 degrees and longitude = 76.8833333 degrees.
