= Wadegaon =

Village in Maharashtra

- Village
- Nickname: Baradoli of Vidarbha
- Location in Maharashtra, India Wadegaon (India)
- Coordinates: 20.34°N 76.51°E
- Country: India
- State: Maharashtra
- District: Akola
- Elevation: 282 m (925 ft)

Population (2018)
  - Total: 40,000

Languages
  - Official: Marathi
- Time zone: UTC+5:30 (IST)
- PIN: 444502
- Telephone code: 07257
- Vehicle registration: MH 30

Wadegaon is a village in the state of Maharashtra located in Akola District in the Vidarbha region of central India. It is located around 618 km east of Mumbai and 285 km west of Nagpur. Marathi is the spoken language. Wadegaon comes under the Balapur Taluka.

Wadegaon is also known as Bardoli of Vidarbha. It is famous for its Lemon production and export. Farming is the main occupation of the Wadegaon. Wadegaon town is situated on Patur-Balapur State Highway.

Fifth Diwan of Baroda State of Gaekwad Dynasty Balwant Rao Bhicaji Rahurakar – (1872–72) (4 months) hails from Rahud Village in Khamgaon.

His descendants are living in Rahud, Wadegaon, Toranwada and Udaynagar (Buldhana). Some of them have changed their surnames to "Rahudkar" or "Lahudkar".

== Geography and climate ==
Wadegaon is located at latitude 20°34'40" North and longitude 76°51'6" East. It is located at an altitude of 925 ft (282m) above sea level. The climate is tropical, and people predominantly wear cotton clothes. Annual temperatures range from a high of 48 °C (118 °F) to a low of 10 °C (50 °F). Wadegaon lies on the Tropic of Cancer and becomes very hot during the summer, especially in May. Although it can be very hot in the day, it is cool at night. The annual rainfall averages 850 mm. Most of the rainfall occurs in the monsoon season between June and September, but some rain does fall during January and February.

== Agriculture ==
Agriculture is the main occupation of the people in Wadegaon. Cotton, soybean and wadegaon lemon is very famous. Jawar (Sorghum) are the essential crops grown in the village. But Wadegaon is famous for its lemon production. Other important crops of Wadegaon are wheat, sunflower, canola, peanut, Bajra (Pearl Millet), Harbara (Chick Peas), Toor (Pigeon Peas), Urad and Moong (Green Gram), etc. Most crops are dependent on the monsoon. Now-a-days many people have started farming with the help of irrigation. Also onion production is one major production.
