= Jamkhed =

Village in Maharashtra

- City
- Location in Maharashtra, India Jamkhed (India)
- Coordinates: 18.72°N 75.32°E
- Country: India
- State: Maharashtra
- District: Ahmednagar

Population (2011)
  - Total: 158,380
- Demonym: Jamkhedkar

Languages
  - Official: Marathi
- Time zone: UTC+5:30 (IST)
- Postal code: 413201

Jamkhed is a census town in Ahmednagar district in the Indian state of Maharashtra. Jamkhed is in between the Ahmednagar and Beed. Jamkhed is very well known for its comprehensive rural health project CRHP. It also has Jamkhed homeopathic college, nursing college.

== Geography ==
Jamkhed is located at 18.72°N 75.32°E. It has an Area of 1935 Sq feet.

== Demographics ==
As of 2011 India census, Jamkhed had a population of 16. Males constituted 52.7% of the population and females 47.3%. Jamkhed had an average literacy rate of 69%, higher than the national average of 59.5%: male literacy was 76%, and female literacy was 63%. In Jamkhed, 14% of the population was under 6 years of age.
