= Mangrul, Aurangabad =

Village in Maharashtra, India

Mangrul
- Village
- Interactive map of Mangrul
- Coordinates: 20.358279°N 75.6212774°E
- Country: India
- State: Maharashtra
- District: Aurangabad district

The village of Mangrul is in Sillod tehsil in Aurangabad district in the Indian state of Maharashtra. As of the 2011 census, it had 788 households and a total population of 3,589.
