= Harisal =

Village in Maharashtra

- Village
- Location in Maharashtra, India Harisal (India)
- Coordinates: 21.5318447°N 77.1074103°E
- Country: India
- State: Maharashtra
- District: Amravati
- Tehsil: Dharni

Languages
  - Official: Marathi
  - Other spoken: Hindi
- Time zone: UTC+5:30 (IST)
- Pin code: 444813
- ISO 3166 code: IN-MH
- Vehicle registration: MH

Harisal is a village situated in the Amravati district, Maharashtra, India. As of the 2011 census, it had a population of 1,479 persons. Harisal is India's first digital village and has been adopted by Microsoft.

== Demography ==
The village falls under the Dharni Tehsil and is governed by a tahsildar. As per the 2011 census, Harisal had 324 households with a population of 1,479, consisting of 776 males and 703 females. About 205 people are children between the ages of one and six. The total Scheduled Castes and Scheduled Tribes population in the village was 935 people and of which 141 ware Scheduled Castes, the rest 794 people are Scheduled Tribes.

Located in the Melghat region of Amravati district, the villages close to Harisal are Adhav, Duni, Kakarmal, Malur, and Mangiya. The surrounding Talukas to Harisal are Achalpur Taluka, Akot Taluka, Chikhaldara Taluka, and Khalwa Taluka.
