= Kada, Maharashtra =

Kada is a census town in Beed district in the Indian state of Maharashtra. Kada is in between the Ahmednagar and Beed and falls on National Highway 561. Kada is very well known in its district as this is the main marketplace for farmers in Ashti tehsil. It also has colleges and schools. For revenue matters Ashti tehsil is headquarters for Kada. It comes under Maharashtra state assembly constituency Ashti.

Postal Code - 414202

== Geography ==
Kada is located at 18.8962°N 75.0785°E. It has an average elevation of 598 metres (1965 feet). Kada is located 45km from Ahmednagar city.

== Demographics ==
As of 2019 India election commission, Kada had around 9,164 (4,736- M, 4428- F) voting population.
