= Nadgaon =

Village in Maharashtra

- Location in Maharashtra, India Nadgaon (India)
- Coordinates: 20.901014°N 76.013965°E
- Country: India
- State: Maharashtra
- District: Jalgaon

Population (2007)
  - Total: 3,020

Languages
  - Official: Marathi
- Time zone: UTC+5:30 (IST)
- Telephone code: 02582
- Vehicle registration: MH 19
- Nearest city: Bhusawal
- Lok Sabha constituency: Jalgaon

Nadgaon is a village in Bodwad taluka of Jalgaon district, Maharashtra, India. The village is 55 kilometres away from Jalgaon city.

Nadgaon is the ancestral village of former President of India Pratibha Patil.

== Education ==
The village have a primary Marathi school.
