= Sangvi =

Village in Maharashtra

Sangvi sangvi Sangvi vitner
- village
- Location in Maharashtra, India Sangvi (India)
- Coordinates: 21.28°N 74.58°E
- Country: India
- State: Maharashtra
- District: Jalgaon

Government
  - Type: village
  - Body: Gram panchayat
- Elevation: 197 m (646 ft)

Languages
  - Official: Marathi
- Time zone: UTC+5:30 (IST)
- Postal code: 425111
- ISO 3166 code: IN-MH
- Website: maharashtra.gov.in

Sangvi is a village in Parola Taluka of Jalgaon district in northwestern part of the state of Maharashtra, India.

== Geography ==
Sangvi is located at 21.28°N 74.58°E. It has an average elevation of 197 metres (649 feet).

Sangvi lies in the Khandesh region, on the Agra-Mumbai National Highway 3.
