= Bodwad =

Village in Maharashtra

- Town
- Location of Bodwad in Maharashtra, India
- Coordinates: 21.05°N 75.77°E
- Country: India
- State: Maharashtra
- District: Jalgaon

Government
  - Body: Nagar Panchayat
- Elevation: 209 m (686 ft)
- Demonym: Bodwadkar

Language
  - Official: Marathi
- Time zone: UTC+5:30 (IST)
- PIN: 425310
- Telephone code: 02582
- Vehicle registration: MH-19
- Literacy: 82.36%
- Vidhan Sabha constituency: Muktainagar vidhansabha constituency

Bodwad is a small town in the Jalgaon district of Maharashtra, India. It is the administrative center of the state Maharashtra in Bodwad Taluka.

== Demographics ==
According to the 2011 population census, Bodwad has a population of 24,221, of which 12,588 are males and 11,633 are females. There are 3,118 children between the ages of 0 and 6, which comprises 12.87% of the population. Bodwad is known for Cotton production and corn. Dry area.

== Politics ==
Former president of India Pratibha Patil hails from this taluka. Her ancestral village, Nadgaon, is a few miles away from Bodwad and is part of Muktainagar assembly constituency. From 1989-2019 former Revenue Minister of Maharashtra, Eknath Khadse was MLA of this constituency. Before splitting from Bhusawal, Bodwad was part of Bhusawal Taluka.

== Education facilities ==
The taluka contains the Government ITI institute at Nadgaon village.
