= Hinganghat =

- City
- Interactive map of Hinganghat
- Coordinates: 20.57°N 78.83°E
- Country: India
- State: Maharashtra
- District: Wardha

Government
  - Body: Hinganghat Municipal Council

Area
  - Total: 82 km^{2} (32 sq mi)
  - Rank: 1 – Wardha district
- Elevation: 217 m (712 ft)

Population (2025)
  - Total: 160,436
  - Rank: Maharashtra
  - Density: 2,000/km^{2} (5,100/sq mi)

Languages
  - Official: Marathi
- Time zone: UTC+5:30 (IST)
- PIN: 442301
- Telephone code: 07153
- Vehicle registration: MH-32
- Sex ratio: 936 ♂/♀
- Website: hinganghatmahaulb.maharashtra.gov.in/en

Hinganghat (Marathi Pronunciation: [ɦiŋgəɳɡʱaːʈ]) is a city in Wardha district of the Indian state of Maharashtra. The city is administered by a Municipal Council. Hinganghat is surrounded on two sides by the Wena River, which provides natural resources. National Highway 44 (old Name NH-7), a part of the North-South Corridor, passes through the city. Hinganghat is located in the fertile Wardha Valley; it was historically a center of the Indian cotton trade and a major centre for grains. The tehsil of Hinganghat comprises about 76 villages. The main language spoken in Hinganghat is Marathi. Hinganghat is the ninth biggest city in Vidharbha and ranks 436 in India according to the 2011 census.

Baba Amte, the social worker who helped people suffering from Leprosy, was born in Hinganghat. It hosts the largest cotton mandi in Maharashtra state.

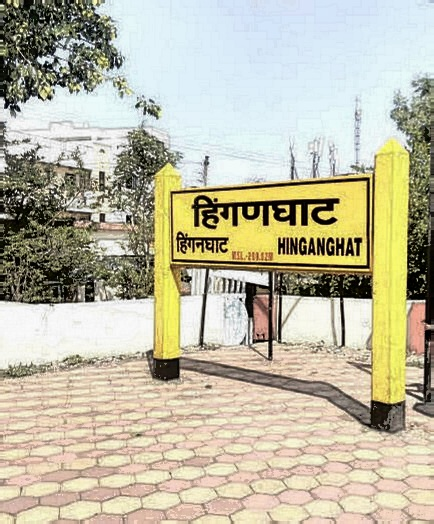
Hinganghat city update

== History ==
Hinganghat is 1500 years old. The city was named Dandungram in the century 5 CE. Reign of Rani Prabhavati Gupta, the queen of the Vakataka Dynasty, was also here. The new name Hinganghat fall because of the availability of Hing (assafoetida) trees and ghats of the Vena river. The development of Hinganghat was followed by the British and the Municipal Council of Hinganghat which was established on 17 May 1873. The first water tank here was built in 1873. The Municipal Council's Hall was built in 1904. The first Election of the Municipal Council was held in the year 1927. The Wena Dam was created by Municipal Council. Presently, seven water tanks are available. The city was historically a major centre of cotton and soyabean oil. Presently, Hinganghat is the largest industrial hub in Wardha District and ranking 4th in the Nagpur Division. The Dal mills and oil mills are also available here.

== Geography ==
Hinganghat is located at 20.57°N 78.83°E. The city has an average elevation of 215 m (705 ft) above sea level, which is low in comparison to the surrounding region. So, the Wena river flows throughout the year and helps the city face no drought. Apart from the river, the average depth of groundwater is around 120 ft (37 m).}

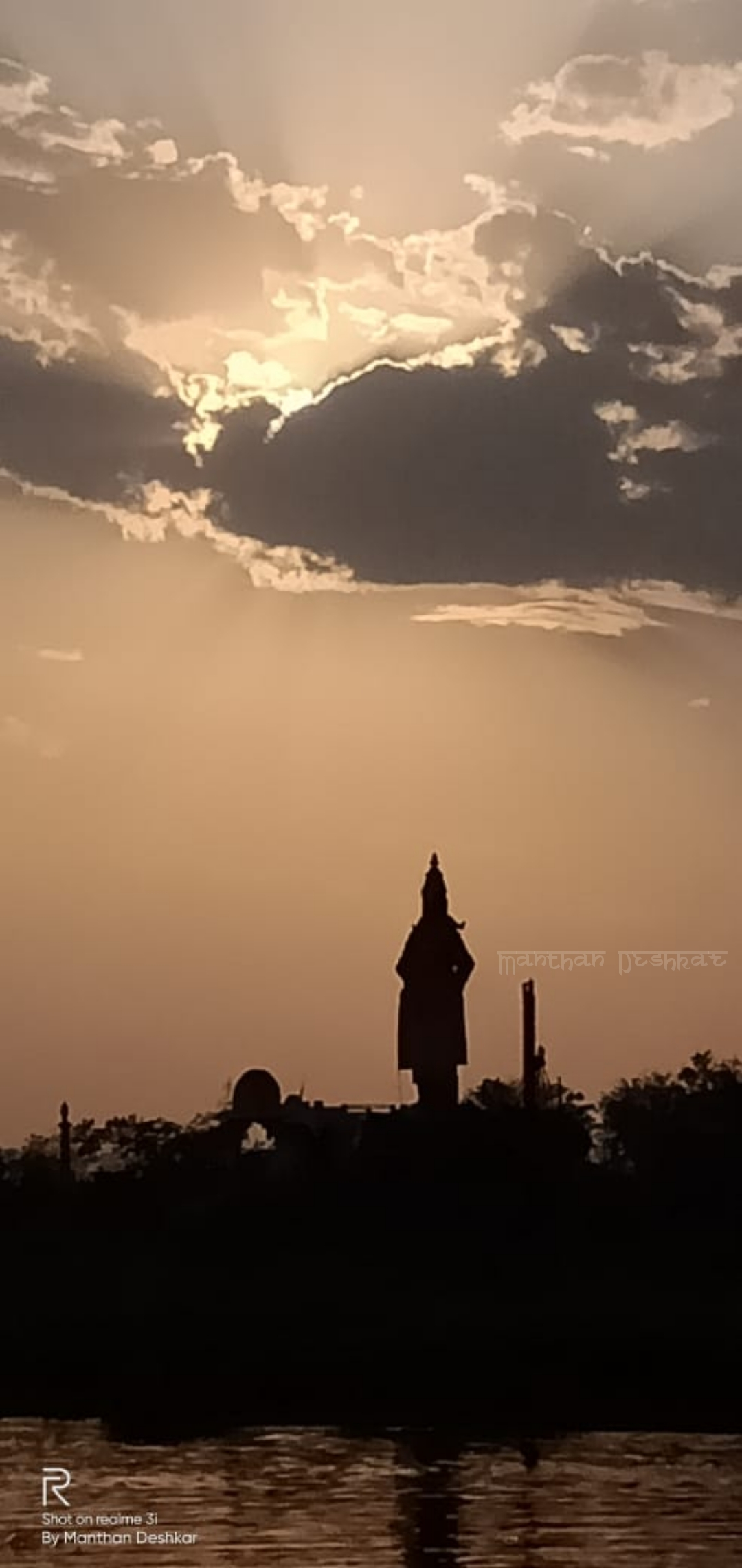
Lord Vithoba statue on Wena River

The city is a hub of India's cotton industry. There is also a soybean oil industry and numerous small to medium scale dal mills and oil mills in the vicinity of Hinganghat. Hinganghat is the largest industrial hub in Wardha District.

== Demographics ==
In 2011, Hinganghat's population was 101,805. Males constituted 52% of the population. Hinganghat's average literacy rate of 94% was higher than the Indian national average of 74%. The male literacy rate was 97% and the female literacy rate was 90%. According to the Times of India, Hinganghat has the highest literacy rate of any city in Maharashtra. Literacy data analysed by UNICEF for cities with populations of more than 100,000 puts Hinganghat at the top, with a literacy rate of 94.34%, followed by Wardha (94.05%), Panvel (93.98%) and Gondia (93.70%).

== Religion ==
Hinganghat is home to the world's largest statue of Lord Pandurang, which is 16 metres (52 ft) tall.

Bansilal Kochar developed the Jain temple in 1955. The decorations of the temple are made of glass. Islam is followed by around 6% of the population and the Jamia Masjid is located near the centre of the city.

In Hinganghat, Garba is worshipped in Mata Mandir, "a temple of Mata Devi". It is the most important place in Navratri in Hinganghat and the oldest temple in the city and the land space was donated by Ganpatro Sadashiv Mawle.

Year	Male	Female	Total Population	Change	Religion (%)							
Year	Male	Female	Total Population	Change	Hindu	Muslim	Christian	Sikhs	Buddhist	Jain	Other religions and persuasions	Religion not stated
2001	47945	44397	92342	-	76.677	7.979	0.239	0.179	13.529	1.306	0.045	0.045
2011	52577	49228	101805	10.248	77.094	7.910	0.171	0.123	13.359	1.182	0.097	0.064

== Transport ==
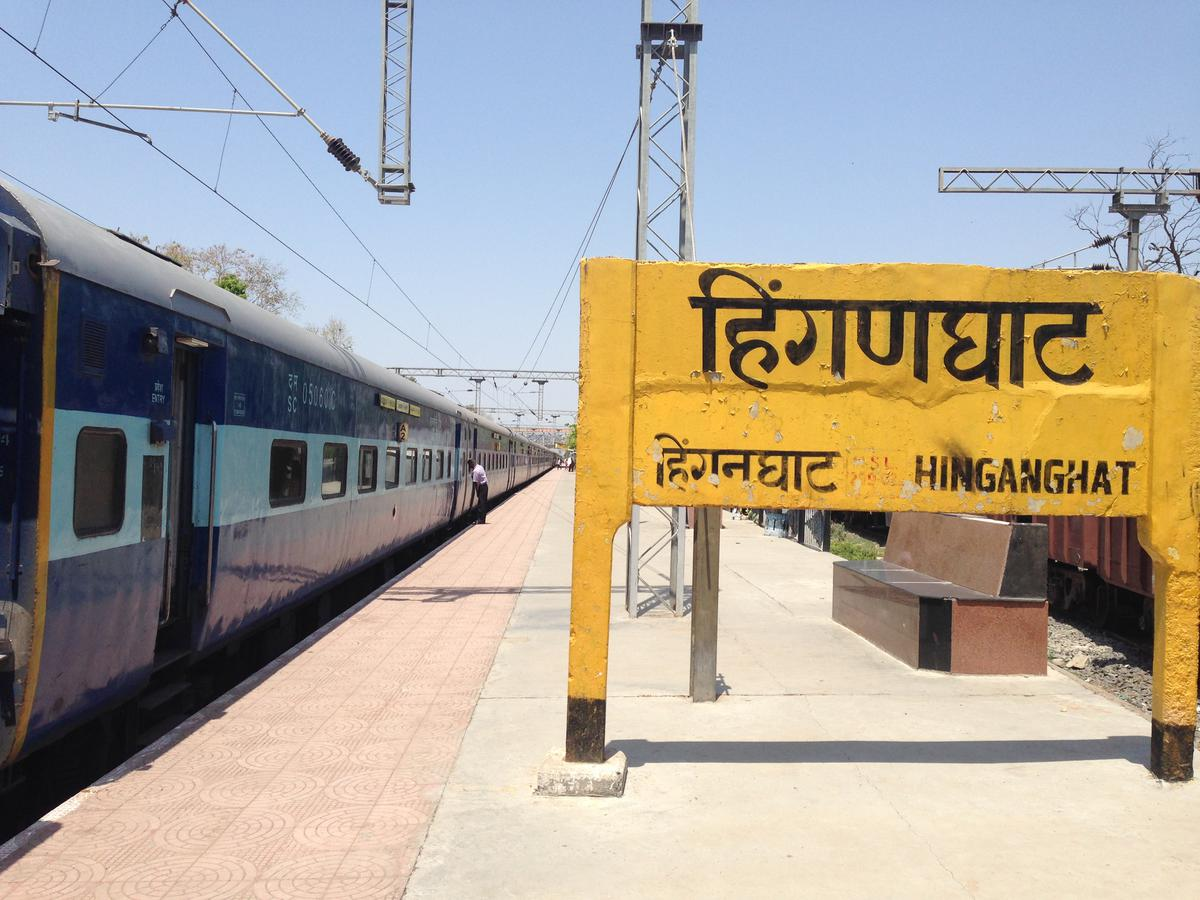
Hinganghat Railway Station

The Hinganghat railway station lies on the main Delhi to Chennai railway line. It is the largest railway station in the region. Express services include the Navjeevan Express, Nandigram Express, Andaman Express, Ahilya Nagari Express, Sevagram Express, Dakshin Express, Grand Trunk Express, Raptisagar Expresses, Secunderabad Superfast Express, Pune - Kazipet Superfast Express, MGR Chennai Central - Jaipur Superfast Express, Gomtisagar Express, Korba Superfast Express, Trivandrum Central Expresses, Anandwan Superfast Express, Yesvantpur Superfast Express, Jaipur - Mysuru Express, and Coimbatore - Jaipur Superfast Express.

The nearest airport is Dr. Babasaheb Ambedkar International Airport, Nagpur which is 70 km away from the city centre. National Highway 44 passes through Hinganghat.

== Notable people ==
- Baba Amte, social worker and activist
- William Lambton, a soldier, surveyor, and geographer, died in Hinganghat on 19 January 1823
- Jani Babu, religious singer
- Sunil Pal, the winner of Laughter Challenge-1 comedy show.
- Vaishali Made, winner of Sa Re Ga Ma Pa, an Indian musical reality TV Show.
- Nisha Mohota, chess player
- D.P. Kothari, academic
- Satyapal Landage (Satyapal), actor and comedian
