= Malkapur, Buldhana district =

Malkapur
- City
- Location within Maharashtra
- Coordinates: 20.885°N 76.2°E
- Country: (India)
- State: Maharashtra
- District: Buldhana

Area
  - Total: 50.80 km^{2} (19.61 sq mi)
- Elevation: 255 m (837 ft)

Population (2021)
  - Total: 167,740
  - Density: 280/km^{2} (730/sq mi)

Language
  - Official: Marathi
- Time zone: UTC+5:30 (IST)
- PIN: 443101
- Telephone code: 07267
- Vehicle registration: MH 28
- Sex ratio: 0.9333 ♂/♀
- Literacy: 85%

Malkapur is a city and municipality in the Buldhana district of Maharashtra, India. It is Known for its historical and economic significance.

== Demographics ==
According to the 2011 census, Malkapur Municipal Council has a population of 67,740. In which 34,693 are males and 33,047 females. Malkapur has an average literacy rate of 82%, higher than the national average of 75%. The male literacy is 89% and female literacy is 75%. In Malkapur, 20% of the population is under 6 years of age.

| Year | Male | Female | Total Population | Change | Religion (%) | | | | | | | |
| Year | Male | Female | Total Population | Change | Hindu | Muslim | Christian | Sikhs | Buddhist | Jain | Other religions and persuasions | Religion not stated |
|---|---|---|---|---|---|---|---|---|---|---|---|---|
| 2001 | 31398 | 29614 | 61012 | - | 51.393 | 41.739 | 0.113 | 0.098 | 4.183 | 2.460 | 0.013 | 0.000 |
| 2011 | 34693 | 33047 | 67740 | 0.110 | 46.826 | 45.638 | 0.145 | 0.035 | 4.519 | 2.325 | 0.012 | 0.500 |

== Transport ==
Malkapur is located on the Hazira - Kolkata National Highway 53, which is a part of the Asian Highway 46 from Kharagpur to Dhule. Malkapur railway station lies on the Howrah–Nagpur–Mumbai line.

Road

- National Highway 53 (NH 53): Malkapur is situated on NH 6, which is a major highway connecting Kolkata and Mumbai. This facilitates easy road access to major cities and towns.
- State Highways: In addition to NH 53, several state highways connect Malkapur to neighboring towns and districts, ensuring good intra-state connectivity.
- Local Transport: Buses, auto-rickshaws, and taxis are commonly used for local transport within the town and nearby areas.

=== Rail ===
- Malkapur Railway Station: Located on the Howrah–Nagpur–Mumbai line, the railway station is a crucial part of the town's connectivity. It links Malkapur to major cities like Nagpur, Mumbai, and Kolkata, providing regular passenger and freight services.

=== Air ===
- Nearest Airport: The nearest airport is in Aurangabad, approximately 180 kilometers away. It offers domestic and limited international flights, connecting Malkapur to various parts of India and select global destinations.
