= Dondaicha-Warwade =

Dondaicha
- City
- Location in Maharashtra, India
- Coordinates: 21.3333°N 74.5667°E
- Country: India
- State: Maharashtra
- Region: West India
- Division: Nashik Division
- District: Dhule
- Talukas: Sindkheda Taluka

Government
  - Type: Urban local body
  - Body: Municipal council
  - Rank: 3rd in district

Population (2022)
  - Total: 60,394
  - Rank: 3rd in district and 1st in Taluka

Languages
  - Official: Ahirani and Marathi
- Time zone: UTC+5:30 (IST)
- Postal code: 425408

Dondaicha-Warwade is a town and consists of a municipal council in Sindkheda Taluka in the Dhule District of Khandesh Region in the state of Maharashtra in India.

== History ==
Dondaicha, from very long time was under the zamindari of Rawals (rajputs). Who came from Rajasthan apparently in 13th century AD. Khandesh is often regarded as "साडे बारा रावलांचा खान्देश" in local language, meaning that Khandesh were ruled by total 13 major zamindar rajput families also known as Rawals. Among them the Rawals of Dondaicha belongs to Sisodiya clan of Rajputs and claim their ancestry from Bappa Rawal of chittorgarh, one of the greatest ruler of India. Current Protocol and Marketing minister of Maharashtra and present MLA of Shindkheda constituency Mr. Jaykumar Rawal belongs to the same family.

== Demographics ==
As of 2011 India census, Dondaicha-Warwade had a population of 46,767. Males constitute 52% of the population and females 48%. Dondaicha-Warwade has an average literacy rate of 71%, higher than the national average of 59.5%: male literacy is 77% and, female literacy is 65%. In Dondaicha-Warwade, 14% of the population is under 6 years of age.
