= Sindkheda =

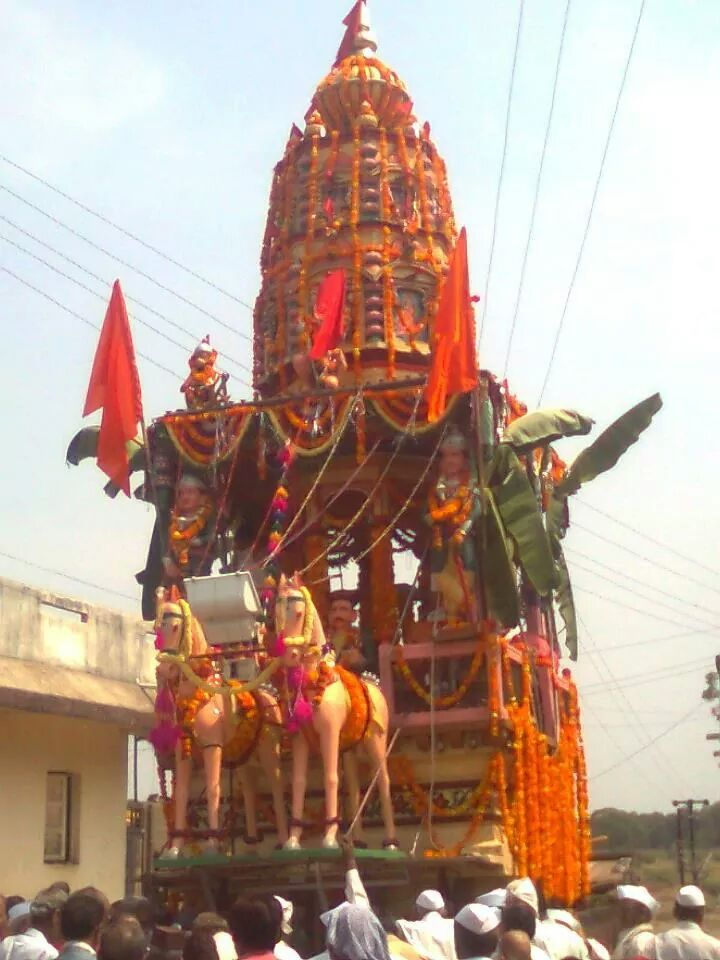
- Balaji Maharaj Rath - Pride of Sindkheda

- Location in Maharashtra, India
- Coordinates: 21°16′N 74°44′E
- Tahsil: Shindkheda India
- District: Shindkheda-Dhule District
- Taluka: Shindkheda

Government
  - Type: भारतीय जनता पक्ष Shri. Jaykumarbhau Rawal (Cabinet Minister in the Shri. Devendra Fadanvis Govt. of Maharashtra)
  - Body: Sindkheda City Council Large_City_Dondaicha

Population (2011)
  - Total: 24,566

Languages
  - Official: Marathi, Ahirani
- Time zone: UTC+5:30 (IST)
- PIN: 425406
- Telephone code: 02566
- Vehicle registration: MH-18

Shindkheda is a taluka in the Dhule district of Khandesh region of Maharashtra state in India. The city is situated on the west side of the Burai River.

The name Sindkheda derives from the many 'Shindi' trees ('Shindi' trees look like Coconut or Palm trees), so the kheda (place) full of Shindi trees is named after it – Shinkheda or Sindkhed.

Rajani Anil Wankhede is President of Sindkheda City Council.

History The Raul (Rawal) of Shindkheda (Sindkheda) The settlement of Shindkheda may have been in the 12th century, before that, this area belonged to Dandaka Aranya. Shindkheda is settled on the bank of the Burai River. There is a story on the name of Burai River. One day a Santa (Pujari) bathed on the little stream, suddenly a flow of water increased, and Pujari's clothes were swept away. Pujari was shocked and surprised to see some new cloths flowing towards him. He thanked the river and said from today you are named Ma Burai, who will wash everyone's bure karm. At the same time he preached anyone "who tries to dirty you will dry yourself or who dirties your water will have a worsened life". ↵After the 12th century, Muslim sardars and Khans ruled this area, causing it to be named Khandesh. It is also held that this is kanha (Krishna) ka desh so it is Kanha Desh (Kanhdesh). Both Hindus and Muslims live here peacefully in Shindkheda. Land divided into the 12.5 provinces, in local languages they are known as Raul (Rawal). ↵Raje Shrimant Pratapsinh Rawal after that Raje Shrimant Lakhesinh Rawal ruled the Jahagiri up to British rule. In the Era of Pratapsinh Rawal, Lord Datta Mandir of Sindkheda was constructed on the bank of river Maa Burai. At the same era, Lord Balaji Mandir might be constructed. Balaji Sansthan started Ratha Palkhi Utsava where every year at Ashvin Paurnima i.e. on Kojagiri Paurnima People of the town and surrounding area gather and pull the Ratha around the main street of Sindkheda. It is one of the huge and famous Rath Plakhi Utsav around the area. ↵During the Indian freedom movement of 1947, Shindkheda contributed freedom fighters like Ramchandra Nathu Buwa-Dukale alias Rama Buwa, Narayan Buwa alias Nana Buwa (Balaji Sansthan, Shinkheda), Vyankatrao Patil. ↵Pratapsinh Rawal was strongly beloved in Hinduism and mythology, so he called to Kavyatirth Hon. Late. Ha.pa.bha. Sitaram Gangadhar Pandit called nickname Shewadkar bapu bapu was a bachelor of Sanskrit language and got a degree from Kashi (Banaras) Hindu Vidyapeeth. He was very popular in Sindkheda taluka. Bapuji read 60 times Bhagwat katha in Datta Mandir. He was master in Vedic Astrology, Mythology and Karmakand he was living at Datta Mandir. This is a great holy place. ↵The whole wooden Rath was built on teak wood and it has five wheels. The fifth wheel is in the middle of the other five it is used on very difficult turning on streets. Ratha is passing through different lanes where Muslim people are also pulling the Ratha from their area. Near the mosque, the Hindus are stop beating their drums and musical instruments. So loving both the communities’ whole world should learn lesson from this small town. Might be more than the last 150 years this Ratha Palkhi Utsav gets celebrated in the area, very next day Shree Balaji Seats on Palkhi in the evening and bless the people of the town. ↵Near the Sindkheda small but famous village Patan which is famous for Ashapuri Mataji Temple. There is a story that Ashapuri mataji is coming on every nauratri for Gharbha dance to the Ghadi of Rawals at Sindkheda. Rawal build a very beautiful temple at Patan. ↵The first Gymkhana (Vyayamshala) in Shindkheda was opened by freedom fighter Ramchandra Nathu Buwa-Dukale, alias Rama Buwa, and he named it after his guru Damodar, Damodar Guru Vyayamshala Shindkheda. ↵The first boys' school was opened in Shindkheda by Freedom Fighter Ramchandra Nathu Buwa-Dukale. Dr. Phade. School was named 'New English School', then it was renamed M.H.S.S. (Mulla Haidar Shaikh Shamshuddin) High School. The first girls' school was also opened in Shindkheda by 'New English School' named after 'Meerabai Fulchandas Shah'. The first Urdu High School also was opened in Shindkheda by 'New English School'. ↵Mangalsingh Nimji Rajput (aka Thansingh Jibhau) was a famous MLA from this taluka. He was a farmer. Accomplishments to improve the community include Shindkheda Railway Station and its platform, the town's water supply system works, the bridge on the bank of River Burai, and the diversion of water from Tapi River to the town. ↵Ratha Palkhi is one of the major utsav celebrated on the day of Sharad Paurnima which is also known as Kojagiri Paurnima. ↵Shindkheda City updated from Grampanchayat to form Nagar Panchayat

== Temples/Masjid ==
- Shri Kedareshwar Mandir, Shivshakti Colony
- Ganapati Mandir, Gurav Galli
- Vitthal Mandir, Desai Galli
- Sant Savata Maharaj Mandir, Mali Wada
- Pachhim Mukhi Hanuman Mandir, Mali Wada
- Balaji Madir, Rath Galli
- Datta Mandir, Rath Galli
- Datta Mandir, Janata Nagar
- Ekveera Mata Mandir, Gandhi Chowk
- Laxmi Narayana Mandir, Virdel Road
- Shani/Kalika Mandir,
- Two Hanuman Mandir
- Dakshin Mukhi Hanuman Mandir, Main Road
- Gajanan Maharaj Mandir, B K Desale Nagar
- Mahadev Mandir, Main Road
- Shri Swami Samartha Kendra, Varul Road
- Ashapuri Temple: A historical temple of Mata Aashapuri Devi. It is situated 2 km from main Sindkheda city in Patan, Maharashtra.
- Jahagirdar Jama Masjid
- 60-Ghar Masjid
- Bohari Masjid
- Pir-Baba

== Schools ==
- M.H.S.S. High School and Junior College,
- S.M.F.S. Girls High School,
- Janata High School,
- Anglo Urdu High School,
- Aadarsh Vidyamandir,
- Kisan High School, Station Road
- S.S.V.P's Arts, Science & Commerce College, Station Road
- Shri Swami Samarth High School, Chilane Road
- V.K. Patil International School, Station Road
- N.D. Marathe Prathmik Vidhyamandir, Varul Road
- Zilla Parishad Prathmik Vidhyalaya No.1,2,3,4,5,6

== Hospitals ==
- Shri Saai Hospital, Station Road
- Sankalp Hospital, opposite Ashok Theater
- Rural Hospital, Sindkheda
- Nidan Lab, near Ashok Theater (pathology lab)

== See also) ==
- Dondaicha-Warwade
