= List of villages in Parner taluka =

There are around 131 villages in Parner tehsil of Ahmednagar district of state of Maharashtra. Following is the list of villages in Parner tehsil.

== A ==
- Akkalwadi
- Alkuti
- Apadhup
- Astagaon

== B ==
- Babhulwade
- Baburdi
- Bhalwani
- Bhandgaon
- Bhondre
- Bhoyare Gangarda

== C ==
- Chincholi
- Chombhut

== D ==
- Daithane Gunjal
- Darodi
- Desawade
- Devibhoaire
- Dhawalpuri
- Dhoki
- Dhotre Bk
- Diksal

== G ==
- Ganji Bhoyare
- Gargundi
- Garkhindi
- Gatewadi
- Ghanegaon
- Goregaon
- Gunaore
- Gadilgaon

== H ==
- Hanga
- Hattalkhindi
- Hiware Korda
- Handewada

== J ==
- Jadhvawadi
- Jamgaon
- Jategaon
- Jawala

== K ==
- Kadus
- Kalewadi, Astagaon
- Kakane Wadi
- Kalas
- Kalkup
- Kanhur Pathar
- Karandi
- Karegaon
- Karjule Harya
- Kasare
- Katalwedha
- Khadakwadi
- Kinhi
- Kohkadi
- Kurund
- KALEWADI

== L ==
- Loni Haveli
- Lonimawala

== M ==
- Mahskewadi
- Malkup
- Mandave Kd
- Mawale Wadi
- Mhasane
- Mungashi

== N ==
- Nandur Pathar
- Narayan Gawhan
- Nighoj

== P ==
- Pabal
- Padali Aale
- Padali Darya
- Padali Kanhur
- Padali Ranjangaon
- Palashi
- Palspur
- Palwe Bk
- Palwe Kd
- Panoli
- Parner
- Patharwadi
- Pimpalgaon Rotha
- Pimpalgaon Turk
- Pimpalner
- Pimpri Gawali
- Pimpri Jalsen
- Pimpri Pathar
- Pokhari
- Punewadi

== R ==
- Raitale
- Ralegan Siddhi
- Ralegan Therpal
- Randhe
- Ranjangaon Mashid
- Renwadi
- Rui Chattrapati

== S ==
- Sangvi Surya
- Sarola Adwai
- Sawargaon
- Shanjapur
- Sherikasare
- Shirapur
- Sidheshwar Wadi
- Supa

== T ==
- Takali Dhokeshwar
- Tikhol
- Taralwadi

== V ==
- Vesdare
- Viroli

== W ==
- Wadegawhan
- Wadgaon Amali
- Wadgaon Darya
- Wadgaon Savtal
- Wadner Bk
- Wadner Haveli
- Wadule
- Wadzire
- Waghunde Bk
- Waghunde Kd
- Walwane
- Wankute
- Wasunde

== Y ==
- Yadavwadi

== See also ==
- Parner tehsil
- Tehsils in Ahmednagar
- Villages in Akole tehsil
- Villages in Jamkhed tehsil
- Villages in Karjat tehsil
- Villages in Kopargaon tehsil
- Villages in Nagar tehsil
- Villages in Nevasa tehsil
- Villages in Pathardi tehsil
- Villages in Rahata tehsil
- Villages in Rahuri tehsil
- Villages in Sangamner tehsil
- Villages in Shevgaon tehsil
- Villages in Shrigonda tehsil
- Villages in Shrirampur tehsil
