= Vadgaon =

Vadgaon or Wadgaon may refer to:

== Places in Maharashtra, India ==
- Vadgaon Maval, a town in Pune district
  - Vadgaon railway station, a railway station serving above town
- Vadgaon Sheri, a neighbourhood in Pune
- Vadgaon Khurd, a neighbourhood in Pune
- Vadgaon Budruk, a neighbourhood in Pune
- Vadgaon Rasai, a village in Pune district
- Vadgaon Malegaon, a town in Nashik district
- Wadgaon Amali, a village in Ahmednagar district
- Wadgaon Darya, a village in Ahmednagar district
- Wadgaon Savtal, a village in Ahmednagar district
- Wadgaon, Pathardi, a village, List of villages in Pathardi taluka, in Ahmednagar district
- Wadgaon Pr Adgaon, a village in Buldhana district
- Wadgaon Road, a town in Yavatmal district
- Peth Vadgaon, a town in Kolhapur district

== Other ==
- Battle of Wadgaon (1779), a part of the first Anglo-Maratha war.
