= Goregaon, Parner =

Village in Maharashtra, India

Goregaon
- Village
- Interactive map of Goregaon
- Country: India
- State: Maharashtra
- District: Ahmadnagar

Languages
  - Official: Marathi
- Time zone: UTC+5:30 (IST)
- Telephone code: 022488
- Vehicle registration: MH-16,17
- Lok Sabha constituency: Ahmednagar
- Vidhan Sabha constituency: Parner

Goregaon is a village in Parner taluka in Ahmednagar district of state of Maharashtra, India.

== Religion ==
The population in the village is mostly Hindu with few Muslim families.

== Economy ==
The majority of the population has farming as their primary occupation. Many of the people are primary teachers as well as in defense. Some are in politics. Goregoan is tourist place, Goreshwar Mandir, Hajrat Abdulshah Noorashah dargah, Water Fall, khandoba temple.

== See also ==
- Parner taluka
- Villages in Parner taluka
