= Shanjapur =

Village in Maharashtra

Shanjapur also called Shahajapur
- Village
- Country: India
- State: Maharashtra
- District: Ahmadnagar

Government
  - Type: Panchayati raj (India)
  - Body: Gram panchayat

Languages
  - Official: Marathi
- Time zone: UTC+5:30 (IST)
- Telephone code: 022488
- ISO 3166 code: IN-MH
- Vehicle registration: MH-16,17
- Lok Sabha constituency: Ahmednagar
- Vidhan Sabha constituency: Parner
- Website: maharashtra.gov.in

Shanjapur is a village in Parner taluka in Ahmednagar district of state of Maharashtra, India. Shahajapur village itself has 50-60 windmills, all over the mountains. This place is an energy center of the Parner taluka. Shahahapur also has a Dargah and A temple. It is surrounded by mountains on all the sides. It is near to Supa village.

These windmills are also seen from Pune-Nagar road.

== Religion ==
The majority of the population in the village is Hindu.

== Economy ==
The majority of the population has farming as their primary occupation.

Shahajapur is close to Supa, which is famous for Windmills. Shahajapur village itself has 50-60 windmills, all over the mountains. This place is an energy center of the Parner taluka.

== See also ==
- Parner taluka
- Villages in Parner taluka
