= Ghanegaon =

Village in Maharashtra

- Village
- Interactive map of Ghanegaon
- Country: India
- State: Maharashtra
- District: Ahmadnagar

Government
  - Type: Panchayati raj (India)
  - Body: Gram panchayat

Languages
  - Official: Marathi
- Time zone: UTC+5:30 (IST)
- Telephone code: 022488
- ISO 3166 code: IN-MH
- Vehicle registration: MH-16,17
- Lok Sabha constituency: Ahmednagar
- Vidhan Sabha constituency: Parner
- Website: maharashtra.gov.in

Ghanegaon is a village in Parner taluka in Ahmednagar district of state of Maharashtra, India.

== Religion ==
The majority of the population in the village is Hindu.

== Demographics ==
Most of the villagers are farmers.

== Economy ==
Farming is the primary occupation in the village. The major crops include onion and pea. Other crops include Jowar, Bajra and Wheat.

Ghanegaon is the largest producer of onion among all the villages in the Parner tehsil. The seasonal onion output is more than 20,000 gunny bags (100 trucks), most of which goes to the Pune vegetable market.

== See also ==
- Villages in Parner taluka
