= Patharwadi =

Village in Maharashtra

Coordinates: 19°44′N 77°37′E

- Village
- Interactive map of Patharwadi
- Country: India
- State: Maharashtra
- District: Ahmadnagar

Languages
  - Official: Marathi
- Time zone: UTC+5:30 (IST)
- Telephone code: 022488
- Vehicle registration: MH-16,
- Lok Sabha constituency: Ahmednagar
- Vidhan Sabha constituency: Parner
- Website: maharashtra.gov.in

Patharwadi is a village in Parner taluka in Ahmednagar district of state of Maharashtra, India.

The population of Pataharwadi is between about 3000 to 3500.

== See also ==
- Parner taluka
- Villages in Parner taluka
