= Narayan Gawhan =

Village in Maharashtra

- Village
- Interactive map of Narayan Gawhan
- Country: India
- State: Maharashtra
- District: Ahmadnagar

Government
  - Type: Panchayati raj (India)
  - Body: Gram panchayat

Languages
  - Official: Marathi
- Time zone: UTC+5:30 (IST)
- Telephone code: 022488
- ISO 3166 code: IN-MH
- Vehicle registration: MH-16,17
- Lok Sabha constituency: Ahmednagar
- Vidhan Sabha constituency: Parner
- Website: maharashtra.gov.in

Narayan Gawhan is a village in Parner taluka in Ahmednagar district of state of Maharashtra, India.

== Religion ==
The majority of the population in the village is Hindu.

== Economy ==
The majority of the population has farming as their primary occupation.

== See also ==
- Parner taluka
- Villages in Parner taluka
