= Waghunde Kd =

Village in Maharashtra

- Village
- Country: India
- State: Maharashtra
- District: Ahmadnagar

Government
  - Type: Panchayati raj (India)
  - Body: Gram panchayat

Population
  - Total: 1,000

Languages
  - Official: Marathi
- Time zone: UTC+5:30 (IST)
- Telephone code: 022488
- ISO 3166 code: IN-MH
- Vehicle registration: MH-16,17
- Lok Sabha constituency: Ahmednagar
- Vidhan Sabha constituency: Parner
- Website: maharashtra.gov.in

Waghunde Kd is a village in Parner taluka in Ahmednagar district of the state of Maharashtra, India.

== Religion ==
The majority of the population in the village is Hindu. Most of the original surnames are Divate, Magar and Pawar.

Waghunde has two temples of Dattatreya and Balanand Swami samadhi.

== Economy ==
The majority of the population has farming as their primary occupation. As the Supa Industrial Area is very close to the village and part of additional Supa Industrial Area is reserved for Japanese industries, the young generation is engaged as employees in the industries and some have started their own small businesses.

== See also ==
- Parner taluka
- Villages in Parner taluka
