= Wadzire =

Village in Maharashtra

Wadzire Vadzire
- Village
- Country: Parner, MaharashtraIndia
- State: Maharashtra
- District: Ahmadnagar

Government
  - Type: Panchayati raj (India)
  - Body: Gram panchayat

Population
  - Total: 3,994 [2,001]
- Demonym: Hindu

Languages
  - Official: Marathi
- Time zone: UTC+5:30 (IST)
- Postal code: 414302
- Telephone code: 02488
- ISO 3166 code: IN-MH
- Vehicle registration: MH-16
- Lok Sabha constituency: Ahmednagar
- Vidhan Sabha constituency: Parner
- Website: maharashtra.gov.in

Wadzire is a village in Parner taluka in Ahmednagar district of state of Maharashtra, India.

== Religion ==
The majority of the population in the village is Hindu. The Majority of the population belongs to a farming community from Maratha Caste.

== Economy ==
-The majority of the population has farming as their primary occupation.

- Weeks of market Thursday.

== Elections ==
- 2020
- 2015
- 2010
- 2005
- 2000

== See also ==
- Parner taluka
- Villages in Parner taluka
