= Jamgaon, Parner taluka =

Village in Maharashtra

Jamgaon
- Village
- Interactive map of Jamgaon
- Country: India
- State: Maharashtra
- District: Ahmadnagar

Government
  - Body: Gram panchayat

Area
  - Total: 2.5 km^{2} (0.97 sq mi)

Population
  - Total: 6,700 (approx.)
  - Density: 2,700/km^{2} (6,900/sq mi)

Languages
  - Official: Marathi
- Time zone: UTC+5:30 (IST)
- Telephone code: 022488
- ISO 3166 code: IN-MH
- Vehicle registration: MH-16,
- Lok Sabha constituency: Ahmednagar south
- Vidhan Sabha constituency: Parner
- Website: maharashtra.gov.in

Jamgaon is a village in Parner taluka in Ahmednagar district of state of Maharashtra, India. This village comes into Moderate income zone and rain shadow area but It is well known for diploma in education college, i.e.(D.ed). This village has a fort of great administrator and one of the chief of Army of Peshwa, Mahadaji Shinde, who got this area as a gift for there bravery called as a 'Jagir'. The fort is gifted to Rayat Shikshan Sanstha by Mahadji shinde's decedent. The main source of income for people is farming but still there are some intellectual families are there like Bora, Pol, Shinde, Navale, Khade and Pawar etc. There are many villagers bearing surname Shinde, this surname came from the maratha clan. Muslims also live together. Jamgaon is very famous for the temples, 'Rameshwar' and 'Malganga' are the main God and Goddesses of the village. All Hindu as well as Muslim and Christian festivals celebrate together.

== Religion ==
The majority of the population in the village is Hindu.

== Economy ==
The majority of the population has agriculture as their primary occupation.

== See also ==
- Parner taluka
- Villages in Parner taluka
