= Gunaore =

Village in Maharashtra

Gunore
- Village
- Location in Maharashtra, India Gunore (India)
- Coordinates: 18.909047°N 74.305844°E
- Country: India
- State: Maharashtra
- District: Ahmadnagar

Government
  - Type: Panchayati raj (India)
  - Body: Gram panchayat

Languages
  - Official: Marathi
- Time zone: UTC+5:30 (IST)
- Telephone code: 022488
- ISO 3166 code: IN-MH
- Vehicle registration: MH-16,17
- Lok Sabha constituency: Ahmednagar
- Vidhan Sabha constituency: Parner
- Website: maharashtra.gov.in

Gunaore is a village in Parner taluka in Ahmednagar district of the state of Maharashtra, India.

== Religion ==
The majority of the population in the village is Hindu. There are several temples in the village. Every year, there is festival in the name of the village deity Bhairavanath.

== Education ==
ZP's Primary School up to 4th standard.

== Economy ==
The majority of the population has farming as their primary occupation. This village is known for its modern adopted technique of agriculture. Pomegranates, sugar cane, onions and water melons are main crops.

== See also ==
- Villages in Parner taluka
