= Vesdare =

Village in Maharashtra

- Village
- Location in Maharashtra, India
- Coordinates: 19.078°N 74.361°E
- Country: India
- State: Maharashtra
- District: Ahmadnagar
- Named for: Geographical structure and position

Government
  - Type: Panchayati raj (India)
  - Body: Gram panchayat

Population (2011)
  - Total: 550

Languages
  - Official: Marathi
- Time zone: UTC+5:30 (IST)
- Postal code: 414303
- Telephone code: 02488
- Vehicle registration: MH-16,17
- Lok Sabha constituency: Ahmednagar
- Vidhan Sabha constituency: Parner
- Website: maharashtra.gov.in

Vesdare (or Wesdare) is a small village in Parner taluka in Ahmednagar district of state of Maharashtra, India.

== Religion ==
The majority of the population in the village i.e. almost 100 percent population is Hindu and majority of them are 96k Maratha.

== Economy ==
The majority of the population have farming as their primary occupation. Village is also known as "Village of Teachers" since there are also a good quantity of people in the village with occupation of teaching. Also, a few people have private jobs in Mumbai and Pune.

== See also ==
- Villages in Parner taluka
