= Wadule =

Village in Maharashtra

- Village
- Location in Maharashtra, India
- Coordinates: 18.9360944°N 74.3855416°E
- Country: India
- State: Maharashtra
- District: Ahmadnagar

Government
  - Type: Gram Panchayat
  - Body: Gram panchayat

Population
  - Total: 570

Languages
  - Official: Marathi
- Time zone: UTC+5:30 (IST)
- Telephone code: 02488
- ISO 3166 code: IN-MH
- Vehicle registration: MH-16
- Lok Sabha constituency: Ahmednagar
- Vidhan Sabha constituency: Parner
- Website: maharashtra.gov.in

Wadule, is a small village in Parner taluka in Ahmednagar district of state of Maharashtra, India. The village is 5 km away from Ralegan Siddhi, which is hometown of veteran socialist Anna Hazare.

== Population ==
Approximately 570

== Religion ==
The majority of the population in the village is Hindu.

== Language ==
The people here speak Marathi.

== Economy ==
The majority of the population has farming as their primary occupation. This village majorly produces Onions and Jowar. Recently they have been producing Pomegranate. Agriculture is partially mechanized.

== Water resources ==
There are many wells in the village and are primary source of water. The village also has a lake and few bore wells. Recently the farmers have built farm-lakes.

== Families ==
Families with last names Gaikwad, Bhapkar, Pathare, Khamkar, Gat, Rokde reside here.

== See also ==
- Parner taluka
- Villages in Parner taluka
