= Punewadi =

Village in Maharashtra

- Village
- Interactive map of Punewadi
- Coordinates: 19°1′48″N 74°23′56″E
- Country: India
- State: Maharashtra
- District: Ahmadnagar

Government
  - Type: Panchayati raj (India)
  - Body: Gram panchayat

Area
  - Total: 14.95 km^{2} (5.77 sq mi)
  - Rank: 46th biggest village by area in the sub district of Parner

Population (2011)
  - Total: 2,971
  - Rank: 27th most populous village
  - Density: 199/km^{2} (520/sq mi)
- Demonym: Punewadikar

Languages
  - Official: Marathi
- Time zone: UTC+5:30 (IST)
- PIN CODE: 414302
- Telephone code: 022488
- ISO 3166 code: IN-MH
- Vehicle registration: MH-16,17
- Lok Sabha constituency: Ahmednagar
- Vidhan Sabha constituency: Parner
- Website: maharashtra.gov.in

Punewadi is a village in Parner taluka in Ahmednagar district of state of Maharashtra, India.

== Religion ==
The majority of the population in the village is Hindu.

== Economy ==
The majority of the population has farming as their primary occupation. The Young generation also join the Police Force as well as Army Forces.

== See also ==
- Parner taluka
- Villages in Parner taluka
