= Karegaon =

Village in Maharashtra

- Village
- Interactive map of Karegaon
- Country: India
- State: Maharashtra
- District: Ahmednagar
- Founder: Forefather of Ghule

Government
  - Type: Panchayati raj (India)
  - Body: Gram panchayat
  - Sarpanch: Baburao Thube

Area
  - Total: 77,689 km^{2} (29,996 sq mi)

Population (2017)
  - Total: 750 approximately
  - Density: 0.0097/km^{2} (0.025/sq mi)

Languages
  - Official: Marathi
- Time zone: UTC+5:30 (IST)
- PIN: 414303
- Telephone code: 02488
- ISO 3166 code: IN-MH
- Vehicle registration: MH-16,17
- Nearest city: Karjule harya, Kanhur Pathar, Takli Dhokeshwar, pimpalgaon Rotha
- Lok Sabha constituency: Ahmednagar
- Vidhan Sabha constituency: Parner
- Website: maharashtra.gov.in

Karegaon is a village in Parner taluka in Ahmednagar district of state of Maharashtra, India.

== Economy ==
- The majority of the population has farming and government sector as their primary occupation.
- Some youngsters are in Defence Services of India to serve the Nation.

== Major attractions ==
- Gramdaivat Shri Kareshwar Devasthan and Gajabai Muktabai Mandir are major attraction of Karegaon.
- Villages in Parner taluka
