= Waghunde Bk =

Village in Maharashtra

- Village
- Country: India
- State: Maharashtra
- District: Ahmadnagar

Government
  - Type: Panchayati raj (India)
  - Body: Gram panchayat

Languages
  - Official: Marathi
- Time zone: UTC+5:30 (IST)
- Telephone code: 022488
- ISO 3166 code: IN-MH
- Vehicle registration: MH-16,17
- Lok Sabha constituency: Ahmednagar
- Vidhan Sabha constituency: Parner
- Website: maharashtra.gov.in

Waghunde Bk is a village in Parner taluka in Ahmednagar district of state of Maharashtra, India.

== Religion ==
The majority of the population in the village is Hindu.

== Economy ==
The majority of the population has farming as their primary occupation.

== New industrial area ==
Maharashtra Industrial Development Corporation launches a Supa-Waghunde Industrial Area which is additional to Supa Industrial area. This Supa-Waghunde Industrial area acquires 420 hector land for industries.

== See also ==
- Parner taluka
- Villages in Parner taluka
