= Gargundi =

Village in Maharashtra

- Village
- Location in Maharashtra, India
- Coordinates: 19°07′07″N 74°20′35″E
- Country: India
- State: Maharashtra
- District: Ahmadnagar

Government
  - Type: Panchayati raj (India)
  - Body: Gram panchayat
  - Sarpanch, DySarpanch: Pramila Babaji Phapale Prashant Kashinath Zaware

Languages
  - Official: Marathi
- Time zone: UTC+5:30 (IST)
- PIN: 414303
- Telephone code: 02488
- ISO 3166 code: IN-MH
- Vehicle registration: MH-16,17
- Sex ratio: 1:1 ♂/♀
- Lok Sabha constituency: Ahmednagar
- Vidhan Sabha constituency: Parner
- Website: maharashtra.gov.in

Gargundi is a village in Parner taluka in Ahmednagar district of state of Maharashtra, India.

== Religion ==
The majority of the population in the village is Hindu.

== Economy ==
The majority of the population has farming as their primary occupation. This village is famous for Primary Teacher. Almost every house have 1 teacher in family. 50 percent people are working in Pune Mumbai.

== See also ==
- Parner taluka
- Villages in Parner taluka
