= Chombhut =

Village in Maharashtra, India

- Village
- Location in Maharashtra, India Chombhut (India)
- Coordinates: 19.017757°N 74.199858°E
- Country: India
- State: Maharashtra
- District: Ahmadnagar

Government
  - Type: Panchayati raj (India)
  - Body: Gram panchayat

Languages
  - Official: Marathi
- Time zone: UTC+5:30 (IST)
- Telephone code: 022488
- ISO 3166 code: IN-MH
- Vehicle registration: MH-16,17
- Lok Sabha constituency: Ahmednagar
- Vidhan Sabha constituency: Parner
- Website: maharashtra.gov.in

Chombhut is a village in Parner taluka in Ahmednagar district of state of Maharashtra, India.

== Religion ==
The majority of the population in the village is Hindu.

== Notable people ==
The first journalist from the village is Pandurang Mhaske, who worked for Sakal, Mumbai Mirror (Times of India) as an assistant editor. Currently working as a bureau chief, Mumbai of Sakal Times (Sakal Papers Limited, Pune).

== Economy ==
The majority of the population has farming as their primary occupation.

== See also ==
- Parner taluka
- Villages in Parner taluka
