= Dhoki, Parner =

Village in Maharashtra

Dhoki
- Village
- Location in Maharashtra, India Dhoki (India)
- Coordinates: 19.165336°N 74.424916°E
- Country: India
- State: Maharashtra
- District: Ahmadnagar

Languages
  - Official: Marathi
- Time zone: UTC+5:30 (IST)
- Telephone code: 022488
- Vehicle registration: MH-16,17
- Lok Sabha constituency: Ahmednagar
- Vidhan Sabha constituency: Parner

Dhoki is a village in Parner taluka in Ahmednagar district of state of Maharashtra, India.

== See also ==
- Parner taluka
- Villages in Parner taluka
