= Wankute =

Village in Maharashtra

- Village
- Country: India
- State: Maharashtra
- District: Ahmadnagar

Government
  - Type: Panchayati raj (India)
  - Body: Gram panchayat

Languages
  - Official: Marathi
- Time zone: UTC+5:30 (IST)
- Telephone code: 022488
- ISO 3166 code: IN-MH
- Vehicle registration: MH-16,17
- Lok Sabha constituency: Ahmednagar
- Vidhan Sabha constituency: Parner
- Website: maharashtra.gov.in

Wankute is a village in Parner taluka in the Ahmednagar district of the state of Maharashtra, India.

== Religion ==
The majority of the population in the village is Hindu.

=== Temples ===
- Charpatinath Baba Temple
- Tukai Temple
- Mahadev Temple (constructed in the period of Shivaji)
- Charpatinath Temple
- Nana maharaj Vankuteker Temple

== Economy ==
The majority of the population has farming as their primary occupation. NGO"s - 1) Prabodhini Sanstha. 2) Grambharti Mahila Mandal. 3) Sanwardhini Rural Development Trust.

== See also ==
- Parner taluka
- Villages in Parner taluka
