= Viroli =

Village in Maharashtra

Coordinates: 24°52′N 72°59′E

- Village
- Interactive map of Viroli
- Country: India
- State: Maharashtra
- District: Ahmadnagar

Government
  - Type: Panchayati raj (India)
  - Body: Gram panchayat

Population (approx.)
  - Total: 2,000

Languages
  - Official: Marathi
- Time zone: UTC+5:30 (IST)
- PIN: 414303
- Telephone code: 02488
- ISO 3166 code: IN-MH
- Vehicle registration: MH-16,17
- Nearest city: Parner & Takali Dhokeshwar
- Lok Sabha constituency: Ahmednagar
- Vidhan Sabha constituency: Parner
- Website: maharashtra.gov.in

Viroli is a village in Parner taluka in Ahmednagar district of state of Maharashtra, India.

== Religion ==
The majority of the population in the village is Hindu.

== Economy ==
The majority of the population has farming as their primary occupation.

== See also ==
- Parner taluka
- Villages in Parner taluka
