= Garkhindi =

Village in Maharashtra

- Village
- Interactive map of Garkhindi
- Country: India
- State: Maharashtra
- District: Ahmadnagar

Government
  - Type: Panchayati raj (India)
  - Body: Gram panchayat

Languages
  - Official: Marathi
- Time zone: UTC+5:30 (IST)
- PIN: 414305 (Alkuti)
- Telephone code: 022488
- ISO 3166 code: IN-MH
- Vehicle registration: MH-16,17
- Lok Sabha constituency: Ahmednagar
- Vidhan Sabha constituency: Parner
- Website: www.garkhindi.com

Garkhindi is a village in Parner taluka in Ahmednagar district of state of Maharashtra, India.

== Economy ==
The majority of the population are farmers. But nowadays many residents migrate to Mumbai for jobs, in fact 50% of the people live in Mumbai.

== Religion ==
The population is 90% Hindu and 10% Buddhist.

=== Gods in Garkhindi ===
- Hanuman - Hanuman is a gramdaivat of Garkhindi.
- Limbadevi
- Pirsaheba
- Malganga Mata
- Yamai Devi
- Vittal Rukhmini
- Mukta Aai Mandir

== See also ==
- Parner taluka
- Villages in Parner taluka
