= Chincholi, Parner =

Village in Maharashtra

Chincholi
- Village
- Location in Maharashtra, India Chincholi (India)
- Coordinates: +) 18.995928°N 74.364374°E
- Country: India
- State: Maharashtra
- District: Ahmadnagar

Government
  - Type: Panchayati raj (India)
  - Body: Gram panchayat
  - Shree Malai-Wadjai Devasthan Trust: Vishnu Sakharam Bhagat 9870552500

Area
  - Total: 2 km^{2} (0.77 sq mi)

Population
  - Total: 3,000 +
  - Density: 1,500/km^{2} (3,900/sq mi)

Languages
  - Official: Marathi
- Time zone: UTC+5:30 (IST)
- Telephone code: 02488
- ISO 3166 code: IN-MH
- Vehicle registration: MH-16,17
- Nearest city: Pune
- Lok Sabha constituency: Ahmednagar
- Vidhan Sabha constituency: Parner
- Website: maharashtra.gov.in

Chincholi is a village in Parner taluka in Ahmednagar district of state of Maharashtra, India.

== Religion ==
The majority of the population in the village is Hindu-Maratha.

== Economy ==
The majority of the 3,000 population has farming as their primary occupation.

== See also ==
- Parner taluka
- Villages in Parner taluka
