= Khadakwadi =

Village in Maharashtra

- Village
- Location in Maharashtra, India Khadakwadi (India)
- Country: India
- State: Maharashtra
- District: Ahmadnagar

Government
  - Type: Panchayati raj (India)
  - Body: Gram panchayat

Population (2011)
  - Total: 3,135

Languages
  - Official: Marathi
- Time zone: UTC+5:30 (IST)
- PIN: 414304
- Telephone code: 02488
- ISO 3166 code: IN-MH
- Vehicle registration: MH-16,17
- Nearest city: Takali Dhokeshwar
- Lok Sabha constituency: Ahmednagar
- Vidhan Sabha constituency: Parner
- Website: maharashtra.gov.in

Khadakwadi is a village in Parner taluka in Ahmednagar district of state of Maharashtra, India.

== Demographics ==
The Khadakwadi village had population of 3135 of which 1580 are males while 1555 are females as per Population Census 2011.

== See also ==
- Villages in Parner taluka
