= Loni Haveli =

Village in Maharashtra

- Village
- Interactive map of Loni Haveli
- Country: India
- State: Maharashtra
- District: Ahmadnagar

Government
  - Type: Panchayati raj (India)
  - Body: Gram panchayat

Languages
  - Official: Marathi
- Time zone: UTC+5:30 (IST)
- Telephone code: 022488
- ISO 3166 code: IN-MH
- Vehicle registration: MH-16,17
- Lok Sabha constituency: Ahmednagar
- Vidhan Sabha constituency: Parner
- Website: maharashtra.gov.in

Loni Haveli is a village in Parner taluka in Ahmednagar district of state of Maharashtra, India.

== Religion ==
The majority of the population in the village is Hindu.

== Economy ==
The majority of the population has farming as their primary occupation.

Villagers now started to looking for milk production. Overall population depend on agriculture activities.

Loni Haveli village is famous for Krishna Temple and Shiva Temple. From Parner Taluka Distance Approx. 8 KM. Only. There is need for proper road infrastructure. However district admirative officials are totally ignoring road infra requirement in Loni Haveli village. On other hand villagers on time to time raise road infra requirement with local/district administration.

== See also ==
- Parner taluka
- Villages in Parner taluka
