= Palwe Bk =

Village in Maharashtra

Palve Budruk
- Village
- Interactive map of Palve Budruk
- Country: India
- State: Maharashtra
- District: Ahmednagar

Government
  - Body: Gram panchayat

Languages
  - Official: Marathi
- Time zone: UTC+5:30 (IST)
- Telephone code: 022488
- Vehicle registration: MH-16,17
- Lok Sabha constituency: Ahmednagar
- Vidhan Sabha constituency: Parner
- Website: maharashtra.gov.in

Palve Budruk, abbreviated to Palwe Bk, is one of the twin villages located 2 km away from State Highway no SH-27 and in Parner taluka in Ahmednagar district of state of Maharashtra, India.

== Religion ==
The majority of the population in the village is Hindu.

== Economy ==
The majority of the population has farming as their primary occupation. People are also in the business of milk. Every family in Palve BK has at least one cow.

The people of the village are also in the business of transportation. There are three to four transportation services in Palve BK.

== Notable buildings ==
Palve BudruK (BK) is known for the temple of LORD SHIVA (Mahadev). There are three temples of Lord Shiva in the premises of Palve BK Village. There is a legend/myth behind these three temples. The temples are situated in a specific way around the village. One is situated on top of the mountain, and is called "Chumbaleshwar".

The second temple is in a deep valley and is named "Siddheshwar". People called this place "DARA" (in Marathi/Hindi "दरा". literally meaning a deep valley). Villagers celebrate the festival "Bhandara" at this place on the third Monday of the Sharavana month every year (in July or August), wherein people from 5-6 villages gather together. There everyone eats a dish called "Prasada" of "lapsi".

The third temple is "Adinath", and is situated on the ground level (1.5 km east of the Siddeshawar temple). In front of the temple is a cold water stream constantly flowing to slake the thirst of travellers, wayfarers and pilgrims.

== See also ==
- Villages in Parner taluka
