= Kalas, Parner =

Village in Maharashtra

Kalas
- Village
- Location in Maharashtra, India Kalas (India)
- Coordinates: 19.11630°N 74.22810°E
- Country: India
- State: Maharashtra
- District: Ahmadnagar

Government
  - Type: Panchayati raj (India)
  - Body: Gram panchayat

Languages
  - Official: Marathi
- Time zone: UTC+5:30 (IST)
- Telephone code: 022488
- ISO 3166 code: IN-MH
- Vehicle registration: MH-16,17
- Nearest city: (Pune, Nashik)
- Lok Sabha constituency: Ahmednagar
- Vidhan Sabha constituency: Parner
- Website: maharashtra.gov.in

Kalas is a village in Parner taluka in Ahmednagar district of state of Maharashtra, India.

== Religion ==
The population in the village is Hindu.

== Economy ==
The majority of the population has farming as their primary occupation. Award: Nirmal gram puraskar 2008 ...in 1866 in British Raj this village mergers in Parner Ahilyanagar from pune's Junner tehsil

Many temples like vitthal mandir, bhairavanth mandir, Ram mandir, Hanuman Mandir, muktabai Mandir..all are situated in the main chauk..

The mahadeo mandir is the oldies mandir which was builded before the village ..the bhairavnath mandir was builded in1778..

Then the vitthal mandir in 1925

The village is situated in the east of belhe, junner

- Parner taluka
- Villages in Parner taluka
