= Kanhur Pathar =

Village in Maharashtra

- Village
- Location in Maharashtra, India Kanhur Pathar (India)
- Coordinates: 19°5′50″N 74°23′8″E
- Country: India
- State: Maharashtra
- District: Ahmednagar

Government
  - Body: Grampanchayat kanhur

Population
  - Total: 5,638

Languages
  - Official: Marathi
- Time zone: UTC+5:30 (IST)
- PIN: 414 303
- Telephone code: 02488
- Vehicle registration: MH-16
- Nearest city: Parner, Alkuti, Takali Dhokeshwar, Bhalwani
- Literacy: 75%%
- Lok Sabha constituency: Ahmednagar
- Civic agency: Grampanchayat kanhur
- Climate: Dry and hot (Köppen)
- Avg. summer temperature: 40 °C (104 °F)
- Avg. winter temperature: 10 °C (50 °F)
- Website: maharashtra.gov.in

Kanhur Pathar is a village in Ahmednagar District, Maharashtra, India.

== History ==
'Sarkarwada' is a historical monument in the form of a small ground fortress or Gadhi. It was a walled village called Gaon KusIn under the reign of Peshwas of Pune.

To the south is a big hillock named 'Dashabai'. According to the British gazette, this hilltop has the ruined tomb of the 'Chand Sultana' of Ahmednagar Nizamshahi. Vitthal Temple and mosque are adjacent which shows a rare tie between two communities. Other famous sites are:

- Wadgaon Darya famous for its stalactite & stalagmite columns in Goddess Daryabai's temple.
- Khandoba Mandir of Pimpalgaon Rotha built in the 15th century.
- A huge bull (Nandi) carved out of stone in Mahadev temple.
- Malganga mandir

== Geography ==
It is a drought prone, semi arid region receiving precipitation of around 20 inches per year. Frequent droughts often cause local dwellers to move away to other cities or other places.

The agricultural area of Kanhur is situated nearly on the ridge line of Krishna (Bhima) and Godavari basin. Local farmers typically raise cows for milk and grow green peas as a primary means for trade.

== Demographics ==
=== Population ===
As per the 2011 Indian census, the population for Kanhur Pathar rests at 5,638 people.

=== Religion ===
The majority of the population in Kanhur Pathar are either Hindus or Muslims.

Whilst boasting a diverse demographic, a majority of Kanhur Pathar residents are from Maratha and Mali.

=== Surnames ===
The most common surnames are Thube or Navale. Other popular surnames are Londhe, Vyavahare and Ghodake.

Navale wadi, Thube Mala, Aadarsh Nagar and Londhe Mala, Bajarpeth are hamlets of Kanhur.

=== Literacy ===
The village is majority literate, having 4,036 literate and 1,602 illiterate residents.
