= Darodi =

Village in Maharashtra

- Village
- Location in Maharashtra, India Darodi (India)
- Coordinates: 19.081262°N 74.291010°E
- Country: India
- State: Maharashtra
- District: Ahmadnagar

Government
  - Type: Panchayati raj (India)
  - Body: Gram panchayat

Languages
  - Official: Marathi
- Time zone: UTC+5:30 (IST)
- Telephone code: 02488
- ISO 3166 code: IN-MH
- Vehicle registration: MH-16,17
- Lok Sabha constituency: Ahmednagar
- Vidhan Sabha constituency: Parner
- Website: maharashtra.gov.in

Darodi is a village in Parner taluka in Ahmednagar district in the state of Maharashtra, India.

== Religion ==
The majority of the population in the village are Marathas.

== Economy ==
The majority of the population has farming as their primary occupation. The majority of people are now situated at Mumbai or surrounding areas for job purposes.

== See also ==
- Villages in Parner taluka
