= Randhe =

Village in Maharashtra

- Village
- Interactive map of Randhe
- Country: India
- State: Maharashtra
- District: Ahmadnagar

Government
  - Type: Panchayati raj (India)
  - Body: Gram panchayat

Languages
  - Official: Marathi
- Time zone: UTC+5:30 (IST)
- Telephone code: 022488
- ISO 3166 code: IN-MH
- Vehicle registration: MH-16,17
- Lok Sabha constituency: Ahmednagar
- Vidhan Sabha constituency: Parner
- Website: maharashtra.gov.in

Randhe is a village in Parner taluka in Ahmednagar district of state of Maharashtra, India.

== Religion ==
The majority of the population in the village are Hindu. And Minority of the population in the village are Muslim and New Buddhism. The Village is also popular in the district for wakefulness of Randhubai (Ambika Mata) Temple.

== Economy ==
The majority of the population is involved in agriculture as their primary occupation.

== See also ==
- Parner taluka
- Villages in Parner taluka
