= Wasunde =

Village in Maharashtra

Wasunde Vasunde
- village
- Location in Maharashtra, India Wasunde (India)
- Coordinates: 19°11′29″N 74°22′16″E
- Country: India
- State: Maharashtra
- District: Ahmednagar
- Taluka: Parner

Government
  - Body: Village panchayat

Population
  - Total: 3,000

Languages
  - Official: Marathi
- Time zone: UTC+5:30 (IST)
- PIN: 414304
- Telephone code: 02488
- ISO 3166 code: IN-MH
- Vehicle registration: MH-16, MH-17
- Lok Sabha constituency: Ahmednagar
- Vidhan Sabha constituency: Parner
- Website: maharashtra.gov.in

Wasunde, is the only village in the Vasunde gram panchayat in the Parner Taluka of the Ahmednagar District, state of Maharashtra, India. The village is 4.8 km (3.0 mi) by road north of Takli Dhokeshwar on State Highway 50.

Wasunde is known for its historic Dakshin-mukhi Maruti Mandir, a temple dedicated to Lord Hanuman facing south.

== Education ==
=== Schools ===
- Jilha Parishad Prathamik School
- Bhausaheb Shikshan Prasarak Mandal's New English School, Wasunde

== Religion ==
The majority of the population in Wasunde is Hindu.

== Areas ==
- BarveNagar
- Wable Wasti
- Boknakwadi
- Gaykhe Mala (मळा)
- Kharabhi Wasti
- Shinde Wasti
- Shikri
- Kumbhar Bend
- Mauli Mala (मळा)
- Shirke Mala (मळा)

== Banking and finance ==
- Kanhur Pathar Patsantha
- Gurudatta Multistate Co-operative Soc Ltd. Wasunde
- Vasantdada Sahakari Patsanstha.

== Temples ==
- Power God Hanuman Mandir
- Mahdev Mandir
- Bhausaheb Maharaj Temple
- Jogeshwari Temple
- Biroba Mandir

== See also ==
- Takali Dhokeshwar
- Karjule Hareshwar
- Kasare
- Parner
- Ahmednagar
