= Kalkup =

Village in Maharashtra

- Village
- Interactive map of Kalkup
- Country: India
- State: Maharashtra
- District: Ahmadnagar

Government
  - Type: Panchayati raj (India)
  - Body: Gram panchayat

Population (2011)
  - Total: 1,582

Languages
  - Official: Marathi
- Time zone: UTC+5:30 (IST)
- Telephone code: 022488
- ISO 3166 code: IN-MH
- Vehicle registration: MH-16,17
- Lok Sabha constituency: Ahmednagar
- Vidhan Sabha constituency: Parner
- Website: maharashtra.gov.in

Kalkup is a village in Parner taluka in Ahmednagar district of state of Maharashtra, It is located in bhalawani parner road with farming as main occupation it also has manufacturing companies of food (Shraddha Food Products) electric vehicles etc. Custard apple farming is the main income of Kalkup. Known for its rich custard apple harvests. The peoples of surname "Adsul" and "Kadam" live in this village.

== Religion ==
The majority of the population in the village is Hindu.

== Economy ==
The majority of the population has farming as their primary occupation.

== See also ==
- Parner taluka
- Villages in Parner taluka
