= Sangvi Surya =

Village in Maharashtra

- Village
- Interactive map of Sangvi Surya
- Country: India
- State: Maharashtra
- District: Ahmadnagar

Government
  - Type: Panchayati raj (India)
  - Body: Gram panchayat

Languages
  - Official: Marathi
- Time zone: UTC+5:30 (IST)
- Postal code: 414306
- Telephone code: 02488
- ISO 3166 code: IN-MH
- Vehicle registration: MH-16
- Lok Sabha constituency: Ahmednagar
- Vidhan Sabha constituency: Parner
- Website: maharashtra.gov.in

Sangvi Surya is a village in Parner taluka in Ahmednagar district of state of Maharashtra, India. The population of Sangvi Surya is about 3000 to 3500.

== Religion ==
The majority of the population in the village is Hindu.

== Economy ==
Farming as primary occupation.

Most of Population stayed in the City like Pune and Mumbai. Once in a year all the people come together for the Festival called Jatra of Shah Sikandar Baba in the month of December. For this festival people travel from cities such as Pune and Mumbai. This Festival is organized in such a way that large crowds come together and enjoy it.

== See also ==
- Parner Taluka
- Villages in Parner Taluka
