= Sherikasare =

Village in Maharashtra

Sherikasare Sherikasari
- village
- Location in Maharashtra, India Sherikasare (India)
- Coordinates: 19.05°N 74.23°E
- Country: India
- State: Maharashtra
- District: Ahmadnagar
- Taluka: Parner

Population
  - Total: 661 area_magnitude= sq. km

Languages
  - Official: Marathi
- Time zone: UTC+5:30 (IST)
- PIN: 414 305
- Telephone code: 02488
- Vehicle registration: MH-16, MH-17
- Nearest city/Town: Alkuti
- Literacy: 75%
- Lok Sabha constituency: Ahmednagar
- Civic agency: Grampanchayat Sherikasare
- Climate: Dry and hot (Köppen)
- Avg. summer temperature: 40 °C (104 °F)
- Avg. winter temperature: 15 °C (59 °F)
- Website: maharashtra.gov.in

Sherikasari is a small village that was separated from Alkuti village in Parner Taluka in Ahmednagar District of state of Maharashtra, India.

== See also ==
- Villages in Parner taluka
