= Bhalwani =

Village in Maharashtra

- Village
- Location in Maharashtra, India Bhalwani (India)
- Coordinates: 19.113157°N 74.550047°E
- Country: India
- State: Maharashtra
- District: Ahmadnagar

Government
  - Type: Panchayati raj (India)
  - Body: Gram panchayat

Languages
  - Official: Marathi
- Time zone: UTC+5:30 (IST)
- Telephone code: 022488
- ISO 3166 code: IN-MH
- Vehicle registration: MH-16,17
- Lok Sabha constituency: Ahmednagar
- Vidhan Sabha constituency: Parner
- Website: maharashtra.gov.in

Bhalwani is a village in Parner taluka in Ahmednagar district of state of Maharashtra, India.

== Religion ==
The majority of the population in the village is Hindu.

== Economy ==
The majority of the population has farming as their primary occupation. Around 70% population of Bhalwani is with unique surname "Rohokale". Bhalawani is located on Nagar-Kalyan National highway, 20 km away from the District place Ahmednagar. Bhalwani Village is located on the bank of Kapri river. There is a MIDC with D+ zone, having around 30 plus medium scale manufacturing companies.

== See also ==
- Parner taluka
- Villages in Parner taluka
