= Wadgaon Darya =

Village in Maharashtra

Wadgaon Darya Daryabai Wadgaon
- Village
- Nickname: Makda ch Wadgaon
- Country: India
- State: Maharashtra
- District: Ahmadnagar

Government
  - Type: Panchayati raj (India)
  - Body: Gram panchayat

Population
  - Total: 1,200

Languages
  - Official: Marathi
- Time zone: UTC+5:30 (IST)
- Telephone code: 022488
- ISO 3166 code: IN-MH
- Vehicle registration: MH-16,17
- Lok Sabha constituency: Ahmednagar
- Vidhan Sabha constituency: Parner
- Website: maharashtra.gov.in

Wadgaon Darya is a village in Parner taluka in Ahmednagar district of state of Maharashtra, India.

== Religion ==
The majority of the population in the village is Hindu. The language which is spoken by the inhabitants is called Marathi. Daryabai Velhabai Mandir is one of the big temples of Maharashtra and there are also monkeys, caves, various medicinal plants, water parks, and birds.

== Economy ==
The majority of the population has farming as their primary occupation.

== See also ==
- Parner taluka
- Villages in Parner taluka

in farmers more plantation in pea plants in their farm
