= Babhulwade =

Village in Maharashtra

Babhulwade बाभुळवाडे
- Village
- Location within Maharashtra Location within India
- Coordinates: 19.050557°N 74.315000°E
- Country: India
- State: Maharashtra
- District: Ahmednagar
- Taluka: Parner
- Population: 2070
- Postal code: 414307
- ISO 3166 code: +91 - 24488

Babhulwade (Marathi: बाभुळवाडे) is a village in Parner taluka in Ahmednagar district of state of Maharashtra, India. It is a village located on intersection of Shirur–Kalyan (State Highway 51). It is famous about Swayambhu Shree Kedareshwar Temple.

== Religion ==
The majority of the population in the village is Hindu.

== Economy ==
The majority of the population has farming as their primary occupation.

== Education ==
- Jilha Parishad Prathamik School, Babhulwade
- Shree Kedareshwar Vidyalay, Babhulwade

== See also ==
- Parner taluka
- Villages in Parner taluka
