= Pimpalner, Parner =

Village in Maharashtra

Pimpalner
- Village
- Location in Maharashtra, India Pimpalner (India)
- Coordinates: 18.92°N 74.41°E
- Country: India
- State: Maharashtra
- District: Ahmednagar

Population
  - Total: 2,086

Languages
  - Official: Marathi
- Time zone: UTC+5:30 (IST)
- PIN: 414302
- Telephone code: 02488
- Vehicle registration: MH-16
- Nearest city: Parner, Ahmednagar
- Sex ratio: 1077-1009 ♂/♀
- Lok Sabha constituency: Ahmednagar
- Vidhan Sabha constituency: Parner

Pimpalner is a small town in Parner Taluka in Ahmednagar district of the state of Maharashtra, India. It belongs to the Nashik Division. It is located 49 km to the west of the district headquarters Ahmednagar, 12 km from Parner, and 189 km from the state capital Mumbai. Pimpalner is surrounded by Parner Taluka to the north, Ahmednagar Taluka to the east, Shrigonda Taluka to the south, and Khed Taluka to the west. Shirur, Ahmednagar, Shrigonda, and Manchar are the nearby cities to Pimpalner.

Pimpalner is also known for being associated with Sant Nilobaray Maharaj, a revered saint known for his devotion and spiritual teachings. His legacy continues to inspire people in the region, and his samadhi (memorial) in Pimpalner attracts devotees from nearby villages, especially during annual fairs and religious gatherings held in his honor.

== Infrastructure ==
The main occupation in Pimpalner is farming, secondary being business. There are almost 403 small villages around the town. Total area of Pimpalner is 1708 hectares. All villagers around the town come and visit weekly market on Saturday and Sunday at nearest bhaji mandai which is shirur and parner. There is a Gram Panchayat, and forest office, post office.

The village's biggest accomplishment is in its use of non-conventional energy. For example, all the village street lights each have separate solar panels.[2] The village is headed by a Sarpanch who is the chief of the Gram Panchayat (village panchayat). The project is heralded as a sustainable model of a village republic.

In 1975 the village was afflicted by drought, poverty prevailed, and trade in illicit liquor was widespread. The village tank could not hold water as the embankment dam wall leaked. Work began with the percolation tank construction. Hazare encouraged the villagers to donate their labour to repair the embankment. Once this was fixed, the seven wells below filled with water in the summer for the first time in memory.

Now the village has water year-round, as well as a grain bank, a milk bank, and a school.

== Education ==
Zila Parishad (Marathi Shala) provides primary school education up to fourth standard. Secondary education is available in secondary high school up to 10th standard. For further education students have to commute to nearby town mainly Shirur and Parner.

== Religion ==
The majority of the population in the village is Hindu.

Majority of people are literate. Education is the main motive of youngsters for survival. Frequent droughts make life of local dwellers and farmers unbearable, so people migrate to cities or other places.

== Transportation ==
=== By bus ===
By Road Shirur is the nearest town to Pimpalner. Shirur is 18 km from Pimpalner. Road connectivity is there from Shirur to Pimpalner.

By Rail There is no railway station near to Pimpalner in less than 10 km. However, Pune Jn Rail Way Station is major railway station 77 km from Pimpalner.

== Agriculture ==
Farming is main occupation of the town's residents.

The main crops produced are:

- Bajara
- Jawar
- Wheat
- Onion
- Green pea
- Vegetable
- sugar cane
- Tomato

== Economy ==
The majority of the population has farming as their primary occupation. Pimpalner also has big market of bajara, wheat, and other grains so the heart of Ahmednagar economy may said to Pimpalner.

== See also ==
- Parner taluka
- Villages in Parner taluka
