= Aale =

Aale or AALE may refer to:

- American Academy for Liberal Education, US educational accreditation organization
- Asociación de Academias de la Lengua Española, the entity which regulates the Spanish language
- Aale Sariola (1882-1948), Finnish clergyman and politician
- Aale Tynni (1913–1997), Finnish poet and translator
- Padali Aale, Indian village
