= Renwadi =

Village in Maharashtra

- Village
- Interactive map of Renwadi
- Country: India
- State: Maharashtra
- District: Ahmadnagar

Government
  - Type: Panchayati raj (India)
  - Body: Gram panchayat 7

Population
  - Total: 1,300−1,400

Languages
  - Official: Marathi
- Time zone: UTC+5:30 (IST)
- Postal code: 414305
- Telephone code: 022488
- ISO 3166 code: IN-MH
- Vehicle registration: MH-16
- Lok Sabha constituency: Ahmednagar
- Vidhan Sabha constituency: Parner
- Website: http://www.renwadivillage.in

Renwadi is a village in Parner taluka in Ahmednagar district of state of Maharashtra, India. According to Census 2011 information the location code or village code of Renwadi village is 558343. Renwadi is situated 36km away from sub-district headquarter Parner and 41km away from district headquarter Ahmadnagar. As per 2009 stats, Renawadi is the gram panchayat of Renwadi village.

The total geographical area of village is 343.58 hectares. Renwadi has a total population of 1,344 people. There are about 248 houses in Renwadi village. As per 2019 stats, Renwadi villages comes under Parner assembly and Ahmednagar parliamentary constituency. Ahmadnagar is nearest town to Renwadi which is approximately 41km away. Digital Village Parner-India

== Religion ==
The majority of the population in the village is Hindu.

== Economy ==
The majority of the population has farming as their primary occupation.

== See also ==
- Parner taluka
- Villages in Parner taluka- Renwadi
