= Pimpri Jalsen =

Village in Maharashtra

- Village
- Location in Maharashtra, India Pimpri Jalsen (India)
- Coordinates: 18.9784578°N 74.3542671°E
- Country: India
- State: Maharashtra
- District: Ahmadnagar

Government
  - Type: Panchayati raj (India)
  - Body: Gram panchayat

Languages
  - Official: Marathi
- Time zone: UTC+5:30 (IST)
- Postal Code: 414302
- Telephone code: 022488
- ISO 3166 code: IN-MH
- Vehicle registration: MH-16,17
- Lok Sabha constituency: Ahmednagar
- Vidhan Sabha constituency: Parner
- Website: maharashtra.gov.in

Pimpri Jalsen is a village in Parner taluka in Ahmednagar district of state of Maharashtra, India.

== Religion ==
The majority of the population in the village is Hindu Martha and also Muslim people leave in village.

== Temple ==
Gram Daivat: Rokdoba and other temple Navlabai Mandir, Datta Mandir, Shiv shankar Mandir Wadhavane Mala, Gaighatbaba, Shree shankarnath baba math and Nurani masjid

== Population ==
Population is about 3000.

== Voter ==
Total=1718
