= Ralegan Therpal =

Village in Maharashtra

- Village
- Interactive map of Ralegan Therpal
- Country: India
- State: Maharashtra
- District: Ahmadnagar

Government
  - Type: Panchayati raj (India)
  - Body: Gram panchayat

Population
  - Total: Around 2,500

Languages
  - Official: Marathi
- Time zone: UTC+5:30 (IST)
- PIN: 414306
- Telephone code: 02488
- ISO 3166 code: IN-MH
- Vehicle registration: MH-16
- Lok Sabha constituency: Ahmednagar
- Vidhan Sabha constituency: Parner
- Website: maharashtra.gov.in

Ralegan Therpal is a village in Parner taluka in Ahmednagar district of Maharashtra, India, about 12 km from Shirur.

== See also ==
- Parner taluka
- Villages in Parner taluka
