= Daithane Gunjal =

Village in Maharashtra

- Village
- Location in Maharashtra, India Daithane Gunjal (India)
- Coordinates: 19.071487°N 74.571633°E
- Country: India
- State: Maharashtra
- District: Ahmadnagar

Government
  - Type: Panchayati raj (India)
  - Body: Gram panchayat

Languages
  - Official: Marathi
- Time zone: UTC+5:30 (IST)
- Telephone code: 022488
- ISO 3166 code: IN-MH
- Vehicle registration: MH-16,17
- Lok Sabha constituency: Ahmednagar
- Vidhan Sabha constituency: Parner
- Website: maharashtra.gov.in

Daithane Gunjal is a village in Parner taluka in Ahmednagar district of state of Maharashtra, India.

== Religion ==
The majority of the population in the village is Hindu.

== Economy ==
The majority of the population has farming as their primary occupation.

Khandoba is kuldayvat of Daithane Gunjal people. One of the best temples was built by village people, which is cost up to 2 crore. Most people visit to this place, which is very near to Hiware Bajar. Big festival is held in the month of February.

== Postal ==
Pin: 414103
