= Motilal Firodia =

Indian politician (1912–1992)

Member of Parliament, Lok Sabha
- In office 1962–1967
- Preceded by: R.K. Khadilkar
- Succeeded by: Anantrao Patil
- Constituency: Ahmednagar

Personal details
- Born: 6 December 1912
- Died: 26 April 1992 (aged 79)
- Party: Indian National Congress
- Spouse: Icharajbai Motilal Firodia

Motilal Kundanmal Firodia (6 December 1912 – 26 April 1992) was an Indian politician. He was elected to the Lok Sabha, the lower house of the Parliament of India as a member of the Indian National Congress. Firodia died on 26 April 1992, at the age of 79.
