= Panewadi =

Coordinates: 19°37′N 76°01′E

- Panewadi
- Interactive map of Panewadi
- India: Maharashtra

Government
  - Body: Nandgaon (Vidhan Sabha constituency)
- Elevation: 476 m (1,562 ft)

Population
  - Total: 2,842
- Time zone: UTC+05:30 (IST)
- Postal code: 423104
- Website: maharashtra.gov.in/1125/Home

Panewadi is a village in Nandgaon Taluka near Manmad, belongs to Khandesh and Northern Maharashtra region in Nashik district. It is located 95 km towards East from District headquarters Nashik, 260 km from State capital Mumbai. Khadgaon (6), Mohegaon (6), Karhi (6), Kundalgaon (9), and Laxminagar (9) are the nearby villages to Panewadi. Panewadi is surrounded by Yeola Taluka to the south, Chandwad Taluka to the west, Malegaon Taluka to the north, and Deola Taluka to the west. It is one of the 100 villages of Nandgaon Block of Nashik district. The village is home to 2842 people, among them 1472 (52%) are male and 1370 (48%) are female. 78% of the whole population are from general caste, 10% are from schedule caste and 12% are schedule tribes. Child (aged under 6 years) population of Panewadi village is 16%, among them 54% are boys and 46% are girls. According to the administration register, the village code of Panewadi is 550317. The village has 498 houses.

== How to reach Panewadi ==
=== By Rail ===
Panevadi and Hisvahal stations are nearby. Manmad Junction Rail Way Station (near to Manmad), Panevadi Rail Way Station which comes under Bhusawal railway division (near to Manmad) are the Rail way stations reachable from near by towns.

==== By Road ====
Manmad is a nearby town to Panewadi having road connectivity.

== 2011 census details ==
Panewadi's local language is Marathi. Panewadi Village Total population is 2842 and number of houses are 498. Female population is 48.2%. Village literacy rate is 70.4% and the female literacy rate is 31.4%.

== Companies and industries ==
1. BPCL
2. Indian oil
3. Concrete Sleeper Factory
