= Hiware Korda =

Village in Maharashtra

- Village
- Interactive map of Hiware Korda
- Coordinates: 19.1328143°N 74.4616403°E
- Country: India
- State: Maharashtra
- District: Ahmadnagar

Government
  - Type: Panchayati raj (India)
  - Body: Gram panchayat
  - Sarpanch: Vacant

Population
  - Total: 2,065

Languages
  - Official: Marathi
- Time zone: UTC+5:30 (IST)
- Telephone code: 022488
- ISO 3166 code: IN-MH
- Vehicle registration: MH-16,17
- Lok Sabha constituency: Ahmednagar
- Vidhan Sabha constituency: Parner
- Website: maharashtra.gov.in

Hiware Korda is a village in Parner taluka in Ahilyanagar district of the state of Maharashtra, India.

== See मळाबाईचं हिवरे या नावाने संबोधले जाते also ==
- Parner taluka
- Villages in Parner taluka
