= Pimpri Gawali =

Village in Maharashtra

Pimpri Gavali
- Village
- Location in Maharashtra Pimpri Gavali (India)
- Coordinates: 18°54′50″N 74°34′34″E
- Country: India
- State: Maharashtra
- District: Ahmednagar
- Taluka: Parner

Population (2012)
  - Total: 1,150
- Pincode: 414302
- Website: maharashtra.gov.in

Pimpri Gawali is a village in Parner taluka in Ahmednagar district of the state of Maharashtra, India.

It is about 25 km from Ahmednagar, and it is well known for the watershed development and agribusiness activities. This village received "Goduli Gram Puraskar" from Mankanhiayya Trust of Dr. Sudha Kankariya due to higher birth rate of female babies.

== Model Village ==
This village is selected under "Model Village" scheme of the government of Maharashtra. Anna Hazare was behind the selection of this village, based on its geography and potential for watershed development work. Anna Hazare and Popatrao Pawar are the source of inspiration and motivation to villagers for successful implementation of 'Adarsh Gaon Yojana'. Villagers purchased a moving earth excavator for the price Rs. 45 lac for their watershed activities.

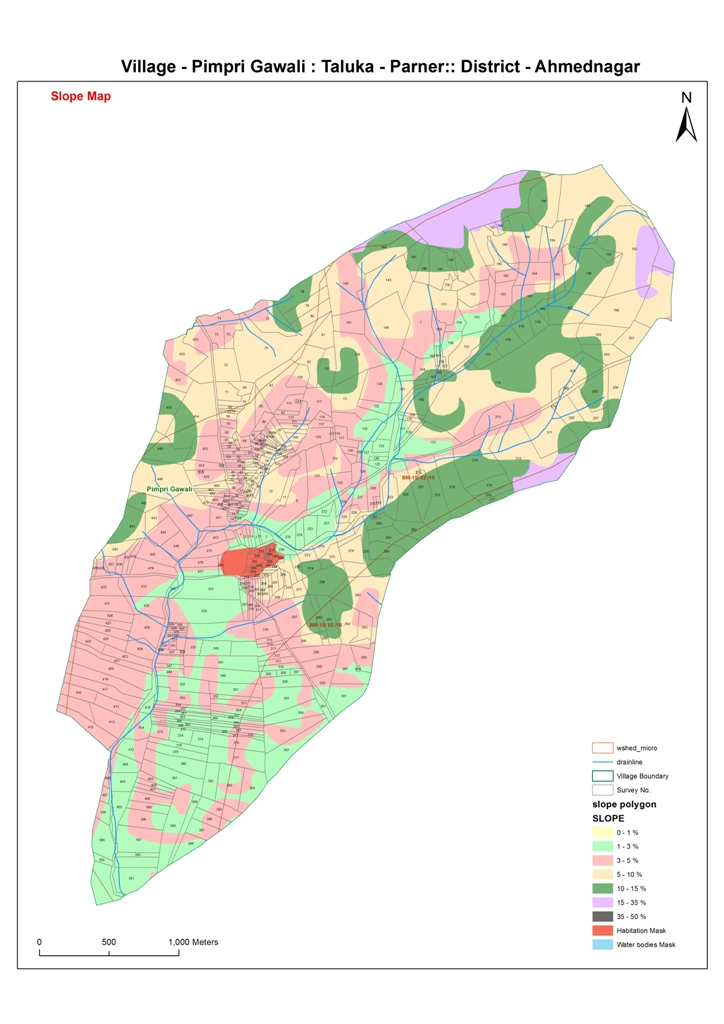
Map of the Village

== Local self government (gram panchayat) ==
Gram Panchayat is the basic unit of the governance in the village. It has seven members elected by gram sabha. Under funds of 13th finance Commission, computerization of the Panchayat is done. Gram panchayat provided job cards to all the eligible people who are interested to work on MG-NREGA Work. The gram panchayat received "Mahatma Gandhi Tanta Mukti Village Award" in 2011 by the government of Maharashtra. Grampanchayat had taken initiative to complete toilets of all households and completed about 80%.

== Co-operative Institutions ==
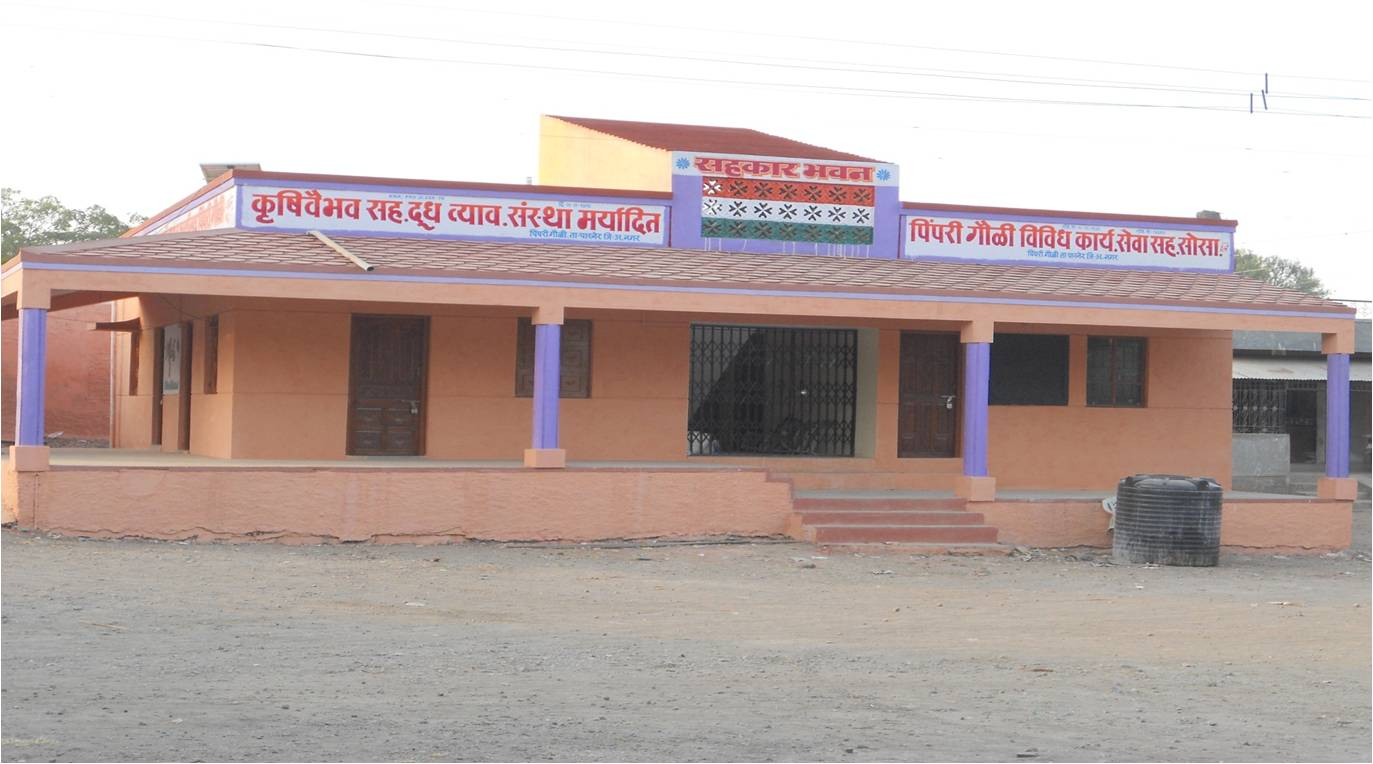
Co-operative Bhavan

A Primary Agriculture Co-operative Society was established in the village before independence. It has about 120 producer members. As of 2013, Anandrao Tatyaba Ransigh is chairman. Krishivaibhav Co-operative Dairy was established in the 1980s and revitalized the economy of the village. Ramchandra Mandge was chairman of the Ahmednagar District Co-op Milk Producers Society.

Religion Hindu maratha "Shatriya"

== Economy ==
The majority of the population has farming as their primary occupation. Thanks to co-operative institutions, the area has experienced a "white revolution", and this small village produces about 5000 liters of milk per day. Livestock plays a pivotal role in the agricultural economy and constitutes one of the valuable possessions of the farmer. Most of the agricultural operations such as ploughing, harrowing, hoeing, irrigation, transport, etc., are carried out with the help of a. Cows are a source of milk. The livestock also provides much of the organic manure used on the farms. Poultry is a good option for farmers due to assured market based on contract farming. The village has five poultry sheds, with a total capacity of about 25,000 birds.

== Cropping pattern ==
Agriculture is the main occupation of the people. The region is rain-fed and has no irrigation canals. Hence, agriculture depends upon tube wells. In Kharif season Moong, Bajara, and pigeon pea is taken. In Rabi Jowar, maize is the main crop. In summer few farmers take groundnut and onion. Now farmers are converting to high value horticultural crops, such as pomegranate orchards.

=== Photo gallery ===
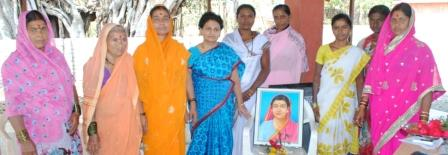
IWD 2014 celebration

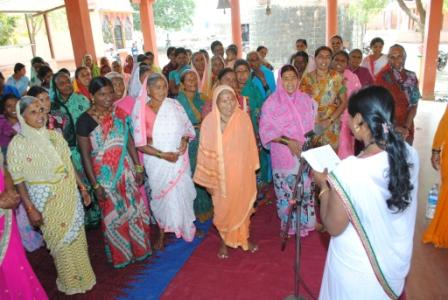
IWD 2014 oath to protect the women child

== See also ==
- Villages in Parner taluka
