= Supa, Parner =

Village in Maharashtra, India

Supa
- Village
- Country: India
- State: Maharashtra
- District: Ahmadnagar

Government
  - Type: Panchayati raj (India)
  - Body: Gram panchayat

Population (2015)Native 3000, Migrated 5000.
  - Total: 8,000

Languages
  - Official: Marathi
- Time zone: UTC+5:30 (IST)
- Postal code: 414301
- Telephone code: 02488
- ISO 3166 code: IN-MH
- Vehicle registration: MH-16
- Nearest city: Ahmednagar
- Lok Sabha constituency: Ahmednagar
- Vidhan Sabha constituency: Parner
- Website: maharashtra.gov.in

Supa or Supe is a village in Parner taluka in Ahmednagar district of state of Maharashtra, India.

== Demographics ==
The majority of the population in the village is Hindu. There are also sizeable minorities Muslims, and Christians in the village. In recent decades, there has been the migration of people from Uttar Pradesh, Madhya Pradesh, and Odisha. The migrants find employment in construction and the factories on MIDC industrial park.

In recent years Supa have become one metro village as it contains people from many locations. Availability of Jobs increasing population in Supa.

It is growing as industrial hub.

== Education ==
=== School ===
- Zilla Parishad Marathi School
- New English School, Supa

=== Colleges ===
- Junior College of Arts and Science
- Samarth Polytechnic College
- Divate Patil Public School
- MET English Medium School
- Agri Diploma College
- New Arts Commers And Science College, Parner

== See also ==
- Parner taluka
- Villages in Parner taluka
