= Yashwantrao Gadakh Patil =

Indian politician

Yashwantrao Gadakh Patil (born 12 May 1943, in Nifad in Ahmednagar district, Maharashtra) is a veteran leader of Nationalist Congress Party from Maharashtra. He served as member of the Lok Sabha representing Ahmednagar (Lok Sabha constituency). He was elected to 8th, 9th and 10th Lok Sabha.
