= Bhoyare Gangarda =

Village in Maharashtra

- village
- Location in Maharashtra, India Bhoyare Gangarda (India)
- Coordinates: 18.877133°N 74.525414°E
- Country: India
- State: Maharashtra
- District: Ahmednagar

Government
  - Body: Gram panchayat

Languages
  - Official: Marathi
- Time zone: UTC+5:30 (IST)
- Postal code: 413703
- Vehicle registration: MH-
- Coastline: 0 kilometres (0 mi)
- Website: maharashtra.gov.in

Bhoyare Gangarda is a typical village in Parner tehsil of Ahmednagar district, Maharashtra, India.

The nearest railway station is Visapur (8 km).

In Bhoyare Gangarda there is Primary school from 1st Standard to 7th Standard and 8th standard to 10th standard High School named "Shree Datta Vidyalay Bhoyare Gangarda."

It is just 8 kilometres from Nagar-Pune Highway from Supe.

== Geography ==
The village is surrounded by small mountains on all sides. There are small caves in surrounded mountains in east direction called "Gardi". Several wild animals are found in forest area: deer, wolves, etc. In the rainy season, one can find small waterfalls at "Gardi".

== Culture ==
There is a big temple of the god Bhairavnath and Maruti. Every summer the festival of Bahiravnath is organized in Marathi Month of "Vaishakh". From the festival of "Nag Panchami" here in village seven day Programme of Bhajan and Kirtan front of the temple Maruti. There is another big temple in "Vitthalwadi" of Hindu gods Panduranga and Rukhmini.

The 60-70% people are vegetarian and follows the rules of "Varkari sampraday". People gather in "Vitthal-Rukmini" temple at every evening for Haripath (Prayer of lord Vitthal).
