= Astagaon =

Village in Maharashtra, India

- Village
- Location in Maharashtra, India Astagaon (India)
- Country: India
- State: Maharashtra
- District: Ahmadnagar
- Population: 2879

Government
  - Type: Panchayati raj (India)
  - Body: Gram panchayat

Area
  - Total: 16.2 km^{2} (6.3 sq mi)

Languages
  - Official: Marathi
- Time zone: UTC+5:30 (IST)
- Postal code: 414005
- Telephone code 02488: 02488
- Vehicle registration: 16
- Lok Sabha constituency: Ahmednagar
- Vidhan Sabha constituency: ahmednagar

Astagaon is a village in parner taluka in Ahmednagar district of state of Maharashtra, India.

== Population ==
As per 2011 census, population of Astagaon is 7733. 4046 are male whereas 3687 are female.

== Religion ==
The majority of the population in the village is Hindu.

== Economy ==
The majority of the population has farming as their primary occupation.

== See also ==
- List of villages in parner taluka
