= Nandgaon, Maharashtra =

Town in Maharashtra, India

Nandgaon
- Town
- Location in Maharashtra, India
- Coordinates: 20.307°N 74.657°E
- Country: India
- State: Maharashtra
- District: Nashik

Government
  - Type: Municipal Council
  - Body: Nandgaon Municipal Council
- Elevation: 475 m (1,558 ft)

Population (2001)
  - Total: 123,191

Languages
  - Official: Marathi
- Time zone: UTC+5:30 (IST)
- PIN: 423106
- Telephone code: 02552
- ISO 3166 code: IN-MH
- Website: maharashtra.gov.in

Nandgaon is a town and a municipal council in Nashik district in the Indian state of Maharashtra. It has a population of 23604 according to the 2011 census. Nandgaon is the headquarters of the Nandgaon taluka.

== Geography ==
Nandgaon is located at 20.31°N 74.66°E, about 100 km from Nashik. It has an average elevation of 475 meters above mean sea level. The climate is quite dry compared to other talukas in the district. The river Shakambari flows through it. Dahegaon dam supplies water for the town.

== History ==
Nandgaon is a railway station on the Bombay-Bhusaval section of the Central Railway. It is a municipal town lying 96.56 km (sixty miles) north-east of Nashik and is also connected by road to Ellora Caves which are 70.81 km (forty-four miles) distant. From a small village in 1881, Nandgaon has grown into a fairly big town but in spite of the commercial activity and prosperity it has brought, the town has not been developed on systematic lines. The roads, though of cement-concrete, are for the most part narrow and flanked by rows of congested and ill-ventilated houses, with the exception of the one leading to the railway station. The railway station has comfortable waiting and refreshment rooms. Behind the railway station not far away, is a travellers' bungalow. Here are also located the municipal civil dispensary and the veterinary dispensary of the Zilla Parishad. Nandgaon is a village in 16th century under Nizam after 1659 Maratha concored this place under Maratha sardar Prataprao Aher, fort is Ankai and Tankai near Manmad.

== About ==
Being the headquarters of a taluka the town has the offices of the Mamlatdar, the panchayat samiti, range forest officer and a score of other government offices. Due to the Girna project, offices of the Executive Engineer, Girna project, and a special sub-divisional soil conservation office have been set up here. The town has civil and judicial courts, a police station, and post and telegraph. During the harvesting season the Nandgaon market-yard handles large quantities of grains and cereals. There are two saw mills, two ginning factories and a milk dairy. The town has also banking facilities, and co-operatives in various fields. Girna Dam 27 km is Tourist place in Nandgaon taluka.

== Temples and mosques ==
Ekvira is the village deity or the gramadaivata of Nandgaon. The town has temples dedicated to Ekvira and Parsh vanatha. The Ekvira temple with a 1.52-by-1.52-metre (5.0 ft × 5.0 ft) mandap and 3.65-by-3.65-metre (12.0 ft × 12.0 ft) gabhara is reported to be nearly 200 years old. An eighteen-handed image of the goddess occupies a central position in the gabhara. The town has a dargah known as Mastani Amma dargah.

Located near the Malegaon Vesh, the Parshvanatha temple is a Jain place of worship. It is a two-story building with a spacious sabhamandap richly ornamented with carved arches and other designs. Near the main entrance there are two elephant figures in a sitting posture. In Bhadrapada, celebrations are held on a lavish scale. There is a marble manastambha about 10.97 metres (36 ft) in height.

There is a temple dedicated to Shiva (Pinakeshwar Mahadev) nearby in Jategaon village. Nastanpur temple of shanideva is also nearby. Pavaneshwar Mahadev temple at Tambewadi, 13 km away to the southeast of the same tehsil, is revered by local people.

Nandgaon has five mosques, of which the Jumma masjid is the largest and the most important. It is said to be nearly half a century old.

== Fairs ==
A fair is held in honour of Ekvira on Chaitra Shuddha 15. It is attended by a little over 2,500 persons. Another fair is held at Baneshwar temple in Bangaon Bk to the south of taluka on the occasion of Mahashivratri. Here also a little over 1000 to 1200 people participate in the fair from adjacent villages like Tambewadi, Takli, Khirdi, Dahegaon, and Tandulwadi.
