= Sujay Vikhe Patil =

Member of the 17th Lok Sabha

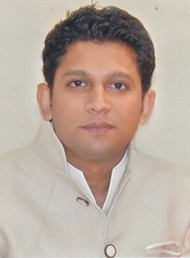

Member of Parliament, Lok Sabha
- In office 23 May 2019 – 04 June 2024
- Preceded by: Dilipkumar Gandhi
- Succeeded by: Nilesh Dnyandev Lanke
- Constituency: Ahmednagar

Personal details
- Born: 10 March 1981 (age 45) Kopargaon, Maharashtra, India
- Party: Bharatiya Janata Party (2019-Present)
- Other political affiliations: Indian National Congress (Till 2019)
- Spouse: Dhanshri Vikhe Patil (m. 2010)
- Children: 1 daughter 1 Son
- Parents: Radhakrishna Vikhe Patil (father); Shalinitai Vikhe Patil (mother)
- Education: M.B.B.S, M.S., M.Ch. (Neurosurgery)
- Profession: Surgeon (Neuro Surgeon); Educationist; Social Worker; Farmer
- Website: https://sujayvikhepatil.in

Sujay Vikhe Patil is an Indian politician and was a member of the 17th Lok Sabha, representing Ahmednagar constituency, Maharashtra. He is a member of the Bharatiya Janata Party. He contested his first election of his political career in 2019 of Lok Sabha and he was elected by huge voting margin of 2,81,526 votes against NCP candidate. In the 2024 Lok Sabha elections, he was defeated by Nilesh Lanke of NCP-Sharad Pawar.

Like a large number of politicians in Maharashtra and in India, Vikhe Patil also belongs to a political dynasty. He is the grandson of veteran politician and seven-time Member of Parliament, former Union Minister of State (Finance), and Union Cabinet Minister (Heavy Industries) Govt. of India, Balasaheb Vikhe Patil.
