= Jategaon =

Village in Maharashtra

Jategaon Nashik
- Village
- Nickname: Govind Kandekar
- Location in Maharashtra, India Jategaon Nashik (India)
- Coordinates: 19°55′N 73°39′E
- Country: India
- State: Maharashtra
- District: Nashik

Government
  - Type: Panchayati raj (India)
  - Body: Gram panchayat
- Elevation: 550 m (1,800 ft)

Population (2011)
  - Total: 2,636

Languages
  - Official: Marathi
- Time zone: UTC+5:30 (IST)
- Telephone code: 02594
- ISO 3166 code: IN-MH
- Vehicle registration: MH-15,
- Lok Sabha constituency: Nashik
- Vidhan Sabha constituency: Devlali
- Website: maharashtra.gov.in

Jategaon is a village in Nashik taluka in Nashik district of state of Maharashtra, India. Jategaon belongs to Madhe Maharashtra and Northern Maharashtra region and Nashik Division. The village is located 116 km towards East from District headquarters Nashik.

== Geographics ==
It has an average elevation of 550 metres (1800 feet).

== Demographics ==
The Jategaon village had population of 5636 of which 2915 are males while 2721 are females as per Population Census 2011.

== See also ==
- Villages in Parner taluka
