= Wadgaon Road =

Town in Maharashtra, India

- Town
- Location in Maharashtra, India Wadgaon Road (India)
- Coordinates: 20.3859°N 78.0989°E
- Country: India
- State: Maharashtra
- District: Yavatmal

Population (2011)
  - Total: 40,884

Languages
  - Official: Marathi
- Time zone: UTC+5:30 (IST)

Wadgaon Road is a census town in Yavatmal district in the Indian state of Maharashtra.

== Demographics ==
As of 2001 India census, Wadgaon Road had a population of 30,786. Males constitute 52% of the population and females 48%. Wadgaon Road has an average literacy rate of 81%, higher than the national average of 59.5%: male literacy is 85%, and female literacy is 77%. In Wadgaon Road, 11% of the population is under 6 years of age.

Year	Male	Female	Total Population	Change	Religion (%)							
Year	Male	Female	Total Population	Change	Hindu	Muslim	Christian	Sikhs	Buddhist	Jain	Other religions and persuasions	Religion not stated
2001	16064	14692	30756	-	87.557	3.872	0.273	0.146	7.030	0.901	0.146	0.075
2011	20923	19961	40884	0.329	87.712	3.270	0.157	0.054	7.644	0.920	0.059	0.186
