= Jadhvawadi =

Village in Maharashtra

Jadhvawadi Khambeshwarwadi No.2
- Village
- Nickname: Jadhav Wadi
- Country: India
- State: Maharashtra
- District: Raigad

Government
  - Type: Panchayati raj (India)
  - Body: Gram panchayat

Languages
  - Official: Marathi
- Time zone: UTC+5:30 (IST)
- Telephone code: 02191
- ISO 3166 code: IN-MH
- Vehicle registration: MH-06
- Lok Sabha constituency: Raigad
- Vidhan Sabha constituency: Mahad
- Website: maharashtra.gov.in

Jadhvawadi is a village in Poladpur taluka in Raigad district of state of Maharashtra, India.

== Religion ==
The majority of the population in the village is Hindu.

== Economy ==
The majority of the population has farming as their primary occupation.
