= Anantrao Patil =

Indian politician

Anantrao Vithalrao Patil

Member of the Indian Parliament for Khed
- In office 1967–1970
- In office 1971–1977

Personal details
- Born: 22 November 1921 Dehu, Maharashtra, India
- Died: 16 April 2008 (aged 86) Pune, Maharashtra, India
- Party: Indian National Congress Party
- Other political affiliations: Indian Independence Movement
- Committees: Press Council of India

Anantrao Patil ( 22 Nov 1921 – 16 April 2008) was a Member of Parliament and Congress Leader from Pune, India. He was Member of Parliament (MP) for the Khed Lok Sabha constituency in Maharashtra for second time from 1971 to 1977 and earlier from Ahmednagar during 1967–1970. He was also a member of the Press Council of India from 1 October 1970 – 27 December 1970 and 7 January 1972 – 31 December 1975.

Anantrao Patil worked as Chief Editor of the Indian National Congress Party Journal in Pune. He also wrote a biography of Yashwantrao Chavan.
