= Aale Sariola =

Finnish Lutheran clergyman and politician

Aale Johannes Sariola (19 May 1882 - 5 October 1948; original surname Hagberg) was a Finnish Lutheran clergyman and politician, born in Oulu. He was a member of the Parliament of Finland from 1916 to 1917, representing the Finnish Party.
