= Alkuti =

Village in Maharashtra

- Location in Maharashtra, India Alkuti (India)
- Coordinates: 19.05°N 74.23°E
- Country: India
- State: Maharashtra
- District: Ahmadnagar
- Elevation: 654 m (2,146 ft)

Population
  - Total: 5,789 area_magnitude= sq. km

Languages
  - Official: Marathi
- Time zone: UTC+5:30 (IST)
- PIN: 414 305
- Telephone code: 02488
- Vehicle registration: MH-16, MH-17
- Nearest city: Parner, Shirur, Narayangaon, Sangamner, Junner, Nighoj.
- Literacy: 75%
- Lok Sabha constituency: Ahmednagar
- Civic agency: Grampanchayat Alkuti
- Climate: Dry and hot (Köppen)
- Avg. summer temperature: 40 °C (104 °F)
- Avg. winter temperature: 15 °C (59 °F)

Alkuti is a village near the western border in Parner taluka of Ahmednagar district in the Indian state of Maharashtra. Famous for its wildlife, mainly sambar and deer. A wide variety of butterflies will be seen here from July to December. It is a tourist destination, and deer and sambars, roaming freely, can be seen up close.

== Geography ==
Alkuti has an average elevation of 2,148 feet (655 m). The village is located on intersection of Shirur–Alephata (State Highway 51). Alukti is 10 km away from Belhe, a village on National Highway 61 (NH 61) Kalyan–Nirmal. Alkuti is also located on NH 761. The nearest railway station is Ahilyanagar, 70 km away from Alukti.

The population of Alkuti is 4850 (2011). Alkuti is also known for Kadam-Bande Wada. It is a great fort located on ground in the centre of village; which is still owned by the descendants of the Kadambande family.and near by large amount of historical places available.

== Education ==
Educational facilities from Primary to up to Graduation are available in Alkuti. Masters & PhD available in Ahmednagar and Pune.

=== Schools and Colleges ===
- Jilha Parishad Primary School, Alkuti.
- Jilha Parishad Primary School, (Bahirobawadi) Alkuti
- Rayat Kshishan Sanstha's Shri SAINATH Highschool and Junior College (Science, Arts and MCVC) Alkuti.
- SAI Education Society's English Medium School Alkuti
- Art, Commerce & Science Senior College, Alkuti

== Transport ==
The village located on State Highway SH 53 Alephata – Shirur. Kalyan – Nirmal National Highway 61 is 10 km away from Alkuti. Pune – Nashik National Highway 50 Old is 22 km away. The Belha – Jejuri Highway is 10 km away from Alkuti. The nearest Railway Station is Ahmednagar, 70 km away from Alkuti.

Transport facilities like MSRTC buses, Private Buses, Four wheelers are also available in the village.
