= Takali Dhokeshwar =

Village in Maharashtra

- village
- Location in Maharashtra, India Takali Dhokeshwar (India)
- Coordinates: 19°09′28″N 74°22′54″E
- Country: India
- State: Maharashtra
- District: Ahmednagar
- Taluka: Parner

Government
  - Body: Gram panchayat

Population (2001)
  - Total: 5,640

Languages
  - Official: Marathi
- Time zone: UTC+5:30 (IST)
- PIN: 414304
- Telephone code: 02488
- Vehicle registration: MH-16
- Lok Sabha constituency: Ahmednagar
- Vidhan Sabha constituency: Parner

Takali Dhokeshwar is a village in Ahmednagar District, Maharashtra, India.
