= Parner taluka =

- Tehsil
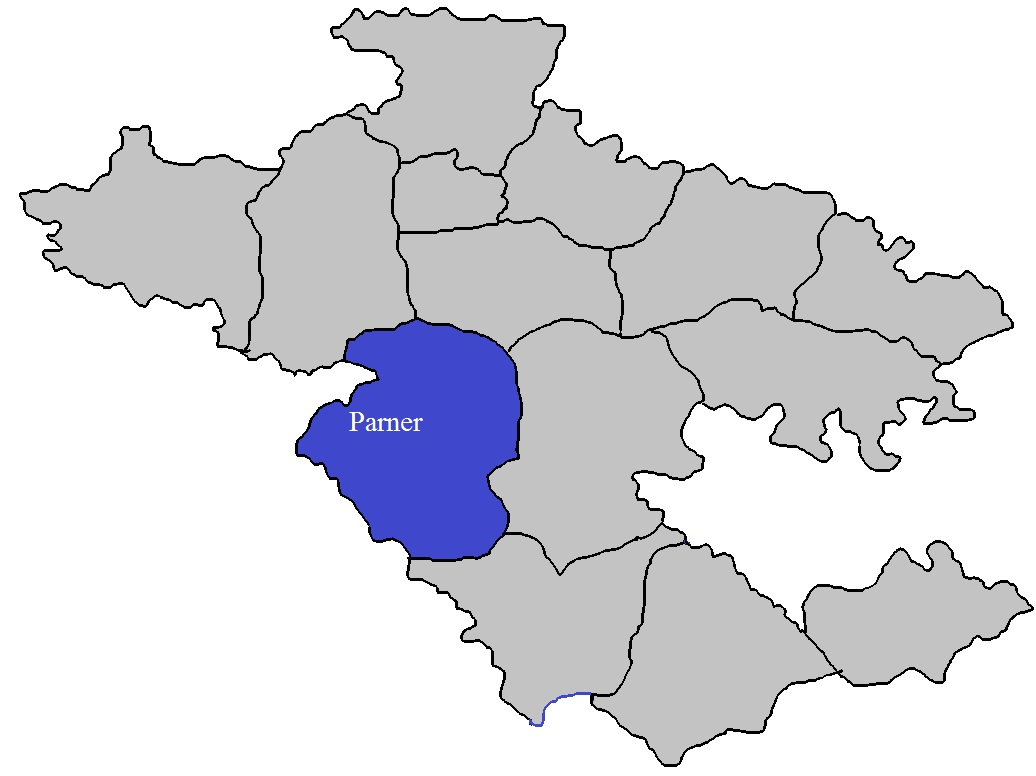
- Location of Parner in Ahmednagar district in Maharashtra
- Country: India
- State: Maharashtra
- District: Ahmednagar district
- Headquarters: Ahmednagar
- Major villages: Parner, Nighoj,Astagaon Alkuti, Renwadi, Takali Dhokeshwar, Supe, Kanhur Pathar, Dhawalpuri

Government
  - Tehsildar: Mrs Gayatri saundane
  - Lok Sabha constituency: Ahmednagar (Lok Sabha constituency)
  - Assembly constituency: Parner
  - MLA: Jansewak Kashinath mahadu date

Area
  - Total: 1,930 km^{2} (750 sq mi)

Population (2011)
  - Total: 274,167
  - Density: 142/km^{2} (368/sq mi)

Demographics
  - Literacy rate: 75.78%
  - Sex ratio: 1.01 ♂/♀
- Rain: 695 mm
- Website: Official website www.parnertaluka.com

Parner taluka is a taluka in Ahmednagar district in the state of Maharashtra in western India.

== Geography ==
Area by land type
Type of Land	Percent
Agriculture	76.55%
Forest	9.74%
Other	13.71%

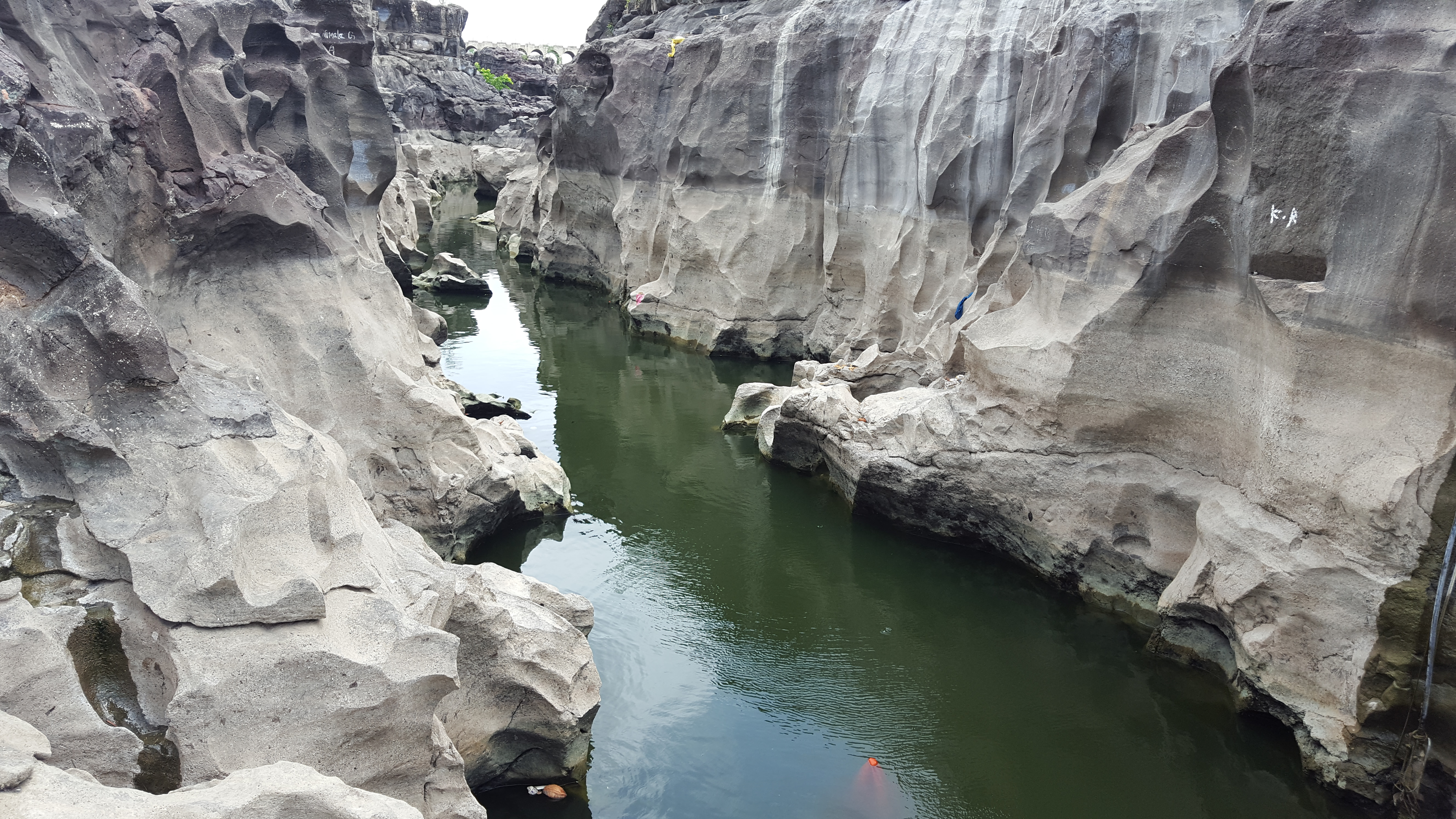
Kukadi River in Nighoj

=== Area ===
The following are area details:

Type of Land	Area in km2	Area %
Agriculture	1,477.63	76.55%
Forest	187.92	9.74%
Other	264.73	13.71%
Total	1,930.28	100.00%

== Population ==
Religions in Parner taluk (2011)
Religion	Percent
Hinduism	95.30%
Islam	3.08%
Buddhism	1.02%
Other or not stated	0.60%

Parner taluka has a population of 274,167 according to the 2011 census. Parner had a literacy rate of 75.64% and a sex ratio of 955 females per 1000 males. The entire population was rural. Scheduled Castes and Scheduled Tribes make up 6.97% and 6.22% of the population respectively.

Languages of Parner taluk (2011)
1. Marathi (96.1%)
2. Hindi (2.50%)
3. Others (1.39%)

At the time of the 2011 Census of India, 96.11% of the population in the district spoke Marathi and 2.50% Hindi as their first language.

== Climate ==
The climate of Parner is moderate, with variations in temperature ranging between 16 °C and 35 °C.

The following chart details the amount of rainfall per year 1981–2004.

Year	Rainfall (in mm)
1981	486.9
1982	622.0
1983	869.0
1984	540.0
1985	575.0
1986	714.0
1987	313.0
1988	472.0
1989	738.0
1989	713.0
1990	630.0
1991	442.0
1992	551.0
1993	696.0
1994	486.9
1995	259.0
1996	656.0
1997	361.0
1998	702.0
1999	245.0
2000	456.0
2001	384.0
2002	438.0
2003	190.0
2004	695.0

== Notable people ==
- Senapati Pandurang Mahadev Bapat (1880–1967) Indian revolutionary, born in Parner village.
- Anna Hazare (b.1937) Indian social activist

== See also ==
- List of dams in Parner taluka
- Talukas in Ahmednagar district
- Renwadi - Famous Gaon
