= Parner =

Village in Maharashtra

- town
- Location in Maharashtra, India Parner (India)
- Coordinates: 19.003°N 74.438°E
- Country: India
- State: Maharashtra
- District: Ahmednagar
- Taluka: Parner

Government
  - Type: Municipal corporation
  - Body: Nagarpanchayat
  - Nagaradhyaksh: Nitin Adsul
  - Current MLA: Kashinath Mahadu Date

Population (2011)
  - Total: About 25,000

Languages
  - Official: Marathi
- Time zone: UTC+5:30 (IST)
- PIN: 414302
- Telephone code: 02488
- Vehicle registration: MH-16
- Nearest city: Bhalawani, Takali Dhokeshwar, Supe, Hiware Korda,Nighoj, Alkuti
- Lok Sabha constituency: Ahmednagar
- Vidhan Sabha constituency: Parner
- Website: maharashtra.gov.in

Parner is a historic town in Ahmednagar District, Maharashtra, India. It is the headquarters town for Parner Taluka. Parner was named after Rishi Parashar, whose son Maharishi Ved Vyas wrote the famous epic Mahabharat also in ancient time parner has called as a PRATI KASHI because in parner there are 12 Jyotirlinga and all are established by Rishi Parshar maharaj (as per the belief of some people).

== Geography ==
The town of Parner is located at coordinates 19° 0' 0" North, 74° 26' 0" East, at an altitude of about 790 metres (2,592 ft).

== Notable residents ==
- Senapati Pandurang Mahadev Bapat (12 November 1880 – 28 November 1967), revolutionary and Indian freedom fighter, born in Parner
