= Ahmednagar Lok Sabha constituency =

Lok Sabha constituency in Maharashtra

Coordinates: 19°6′8.46″N 74°45′0.84″E

Ahmednagar MH-16
- Lok Sabha constituency
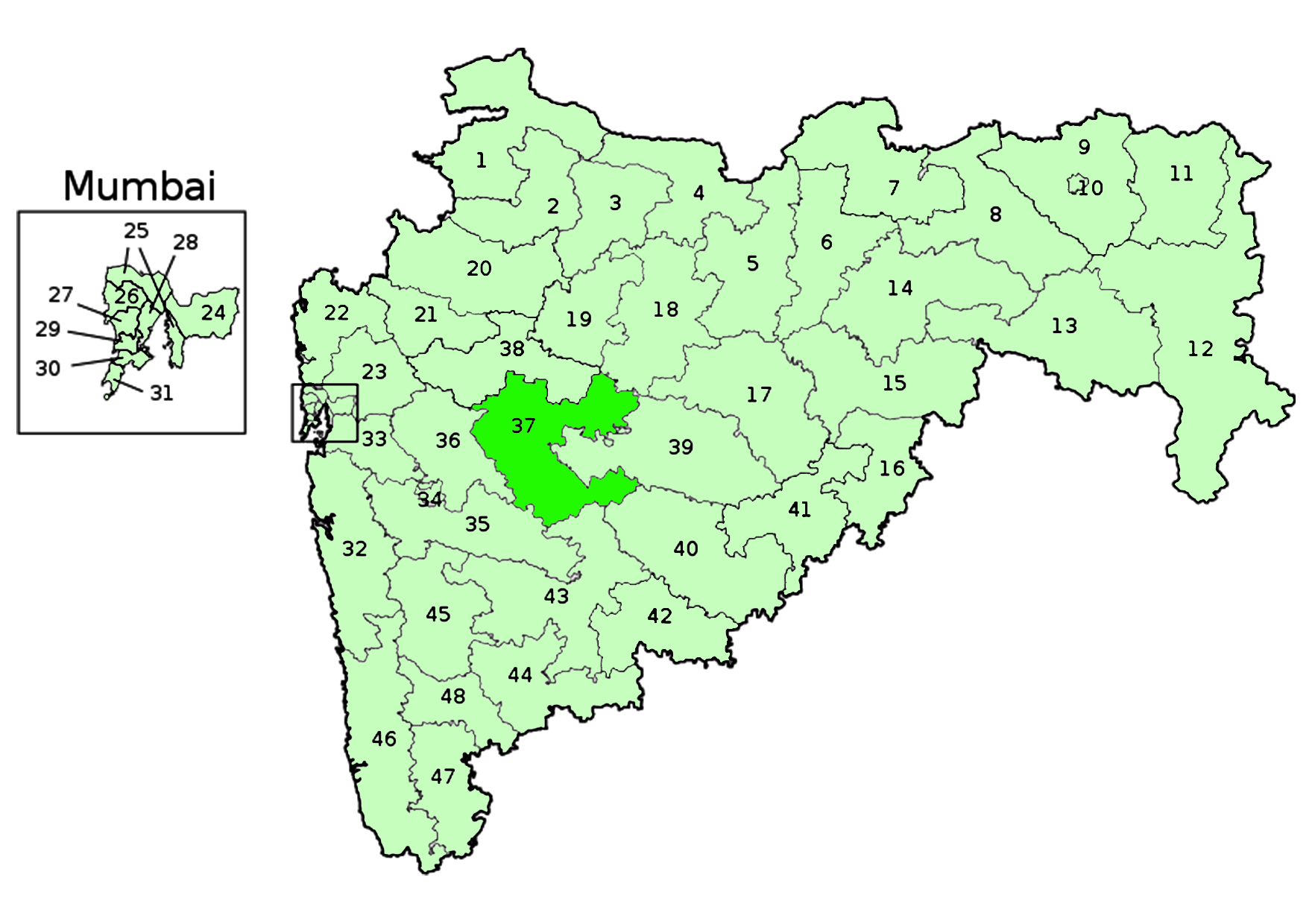
- Dark Area of Constituency

Constituency details
- Country: India
- Region: Western India
- State: Maharashtra
- Assembly constituencies: Shevgaon; Rahuri; Parner; Ahmednagar City; Shrigonda; Karjat Jamkhed
- Established: 1952–present
- Reservation: None

Member of Parliament
- 18th Lok Sabha
- Incumbent Nilesh Dnyandev Lanke
- Party: NCP-SP
- Alliance: INDIA
- Elected year: 2024
- Preceded by: Sujay Vikhe Patil

Ahmednagar Lok Sabha constituency is one of the 48 parliamentary constituencies of the Lok Sabha in the state of Maharashtra.

== Assembly segments ==
Presently, after the implementation of the Presidential notification on delimitation on 19 February 2008, Ahmednagarr Lok Sabha constituency comprises six Vidhan Sabha (legislative assembly) segments. These segments are:

Constituency number	Name	Reserved for (SC/ST/None)	District	MLA, from October 2024	MLA's Party	May 2024 Lok Sabha Lead
222	Shevgaon	None	Ahmednagar	Monika Rajiv Rajale	BJP	BJP
223	Rahuri	None	Ahmednagar		BJP	BJP
224	Parner	None	Ahmednagar	Kashinath Mahadu Date	NCP	NCP-SP
225	Ahmednagar City	None	Ahmednagar	Sangram Arun Jagtap	NCP	BJP
226	Shrigonda	None	Ahmednagar	Vikram Pachpute	BJP	NCP-SP
227	Karjat Jamkhed	None	Ahmednagar	Rohit Pawar	NCP-SP	NCP-SP

== Members of Parliament ==
Year	Name	Party
1952	Uttamchand R Bogawat	Indian National Congress
1957	Raghunath Keshav Khadilkar	Independent
1962	Motilal Firodia	Indian National Congress
1967	Anantrao Patil	Indian National Congress
1971	Annasaheb Shinde	Indian National Congress
1977	Annasaheb Shinde	Indian National Congress
1980	Chandrabhan Athare Patil	Indian National Congress (I)
1984	Yashwantrao Gadakh Patil	Indian National Congress
1989	Yashwantrao Gadakh Patil	Indian National Congress
1991	Yashwantrao Gadakh Patil	Indian National Congress
1994^	Maruti Shelke alias Dada Patil Shelke	Indian National Congress
1996	Maruti Shelke alias Dada Patil Shelke	Indian National Congress
1998	Balasaheb Vikhe Patil	Shiv Sena
1999	Dilipkumar Gandhi	Bharatiya Janata Party
2004	Tukaram Gangadhar Gadakh	Nationalist Congress Party
2009	Dilipkumar Gandhi	Bharatiya Janata Party
2014	Dilipkumar Gandhi	Bharatiya Janata Party
2019	Sujay Vikhe Patil	Bharatiya Janata Party
2024	Nilesh Lanke	Nationalist Congress Party (Sharadchandra Pawar)

^bypoll

== Election results ==
Vote share of Winning candidates
2024	47.14%
2019	58.54%
2014	56.97%
2009	39.65%
2004	52.77%
1999	38.05%
1998	49.33%
1996	38.40%
1991	46.41%
1989	56.08%
1984	58.89%
1980	63.50%
1977	35.39%
1971	54.81%
1967	51.53%
1962	53.31%
1957	52.12%
1952	56.91%

=== General elections 2024 ===
2024 Indian general elections: Ahmednagar
Party	Candidate	Votes	%	±%
NCP-SP	Nilesh Dnyandev Lanke	624,797	47.14	New
BJP	Sujay Vikhe Patil	5,95,868	44.95	▼13.59
Independent	Alekar Gorakh Dashrath	44,597	3.36	N/A
VBA	Deelip Kondiba Khedkar	13,749	1.04	N/A
NOTA	None of the Above	3,282	0.25	N/A
Majority		28,929	2.18	▼21.21
Turnout		13,27,130	66.73	▲1.74
NCP-SP gain from BJP		Swing		

=== General elections 2019 ===
2019 Indian general elections: Ahmednagar
Party	Candidate	Votes	%	±%
BJP	Sujay Vikhe Patil	704,660	58.54	▲1.57
NCP	Sangram Arun Jagtap	4,23,186	35.15	▼2.13
VBA	Sudhakar Avhad	31,807	2.64	New
Majority		2,81,526	23.34	▲3.65
Turnout		12,06,090	64.79	▲2.46
BJP hold		Swing	▲9.16	

=== General elections 2014 ===
2014 Indian general elections: Ahmednagar
Party	Candidate	Votes	%	±%
BJP	Dilip Gandhi	605,185	56.97	+17.32
NCP	Rajeev Rajale	3,96,063	37.28	+3.57
Majority		2,09,122	19.69	+13.75
Turnout		10,62,780	62.33	
BJP hold		Swing	+17.32	

=== General elections 2009 ===
2009 Indian general elections: Ahmednagar
Party	Candidate	Votes	%	±%
BJP	Dilip Gandhi	312,047	39.65	
NCP	Shivaji Kardile	2,65,316	33.71	
Independent	Rajeev Rajale	1,52,795	19.41	
Majority		46,731	5.94	
Turnout		7,86,980	51.84	
BJP gain from NCP		Swing		

=== General elections 2004 ===
2004 Indian general elections: Ahmednagar
Party	Candidate	Votes	%	±%
NCP	Tukaram Gadakh	362,938	52.77%	
BJP	Prof. N. S. Pharande	2,87,861	41.86%	
Majority		75,077	10.92	
Turnout		6,87,722	51.84	
NCP gain from BJP		Swing		

=== General elections 1999 ===
1999 Indian general elections: Ahmednagar
Party	Candidate	Votes	%	±%
BJP	Dilip Gandhi	278,508	38.05%	
NCP	Maruti Deoram Shelke	2,50,051	34.17%	
INC	Babasaheb Sahadu Bhos	1,89,589	25.91%	
Majority		28,457	3.89%	
Turnout		7,31,858	67.64%	
BJP gain from SS		Swing		

=== General elections 1998 ===
1998 Indian general election: Ahmednagar
Party	Candidate	Votes	%	±%
SS	Balasaheb Vikhe	323,024	49.33%	
INC	Maruti Deoram Shelke	3,08,779	47.15%	
Majority		14,245	5.94	
Turnout		6,54,846	59.68%	
SS gain from INC		Swing		

=== General elections 1996 ===
1996 Indian general election: Ahmednagar
Party	Candidate	Votes	%	±%
INC	Maruti Deoram Shelke	212,751	38.40%	
SS	Parvez Damaniya	1,63,342	29.48%	
Independent	Tukaram Gadakh	1,19,277	21.53%	
Majority		49,409	5.94	
Turnout		5,54,015	51.39%	
INC hold		Swing		

=== General elections 1991 ===
1991 Indian general election: Ahmednagar
Party	Candidate	Votes	%	±%
INC	Yashwantrao Gadakh	279,520	46.41%	
Independent	Balasaheb Vikhe	2,67,883	44.48%	
BJP	Rajabhau Zarkar	37,330	6.20%	
Majority		11,637	5.94	
Turnout		6,02,294	61.42%	
INC hold		Swing		

=== General elections 1989 ===
1989 Indian general election: Ahmednagar
Party	Candidate	Votes	%	±%
INC	Yashwantrao Gadakh	297,209	56.08%	
BJP	N. S. Faranda	1,43,464	27.07%	
JD	Kumar Saptarshi	59,171	11.16%	
Majority		1,53,745	5.94	
Turnout		5,29,972	55.53%	
INC hold		Swing		

=== General elections 1984 ===
1984 Indian general election: Ahmednagar
Party	Candidate	Votes	%	±%
INC	Yashwantrao Gadakh	281,873	58.89%	
JP	Babanrao Dhakne	1,81,550	37.93%	
Majority		1,00,322	5.94	
Turnout		4,78,676	63.98%	
INC hold		Swing		

=== General elections 1980 ===
1980 Indian general election: Ahmednagar
Party	Candidate	Votes	%	±%
INC	Chandrabhan Balaji Athare	260,459	63.50%	
INC(U)	Eknath B. Nimbalkar	80,245	19.56%	
JP	Rajaram Murlidhar Zarkar	60,016	14.63%	
Majority		1,53,745	5.94	
Turnout		4,10,162	60.12%	
INC(I) gain from INC		Swing		

=== General elections 1977 ===
1977 Indian general election: Ahmednagar
Party	Candidate	Votes	%	±%
INC	Annasaheb Shinde	114,737	35.39%	
BLD	Mohanrao Abasaheb Gade	80,245	19.56%	
CPI	Balasaheb Nabaji Nagawade	29,947	9.24%	
Majority		64,813	5.94	
Turnout		3,24,234	58.06%	
INC hold		Swing		

=== General elections 1971 ===
1971 Indian general election: Ahmednagar
Party	Candidate	Votes	%	±%
INC	Annasaheb Shinde	152,262	54.81%	▲3.28
Independent	Prabhakar Kondaji Bhapkar	1,04,419	37.59%	
Independent	Mohanrao Abasaheb Gade	15,081	5.43%	
Majority		47,843	17.22%	
Turnout		2,77,789	57.57%	▼4.15
INC hold		Swing		

=== General elections 1967 ===
1967 Indian general election: Ahmednagar
Party	Candidate	Votes	%	±%
INC	Anantrao Patil	142,925	51.53%	▼1.78
CPI	E. L. Bhagwat	92,285	33.27%	
Independent	P. R. Kanavade	42,144	15.20%	
Majority		50,640	18.25%	▲11.65
Turnout		2,77,354	61.72%	▲6.74
INC hold		Swing		

=== General elections 1962 ===
1962 Indian general election: Ahmednagar
Party	Candidate	Votes	%	±%
INC	Motilal Firodia	113,159	53.31%	▲16.10%
Independent	Prabhakar Kondaji Bhapkar	99,121	46.69%	"New"
Majority		14,038	6.60%	▼8.30%
Turnout		2,12,280	54.98%	▲6.84%
INC gain from Independent		Swing		

=== General elections 1957 ===
1957 Indian general election: Ahmednagar
Party	Candidate	Votes	%	±%
Independent	Raghunath Keshav Khadilkar	85,265	52.12%	"New"
INC	Uttamchand Bogawat	60,873	37.21%	▼19.70%
Independent	Bhaskar Pandurang Hiwale	17,442	10.66%	"New"
Majority		24,392	14.90%	▲1.10%
Turnout		1,63,580	48.14%	▲7.80%
Independent gain from INC		Swing		

=== General elections 1952 ===
1952 Indian general election: Ahmednagar
Party	Candidate	Votes	%	±%
INC	Uttamchand Ramchand Bogavat	88,815	56.91%	"New"
Kamgar Kisan Paksha	N. N. Satha	67,239	43.09%	"New"
Majority		21,576	13.80%	
Turnout		1,56,054	40.34%	
INC win (new seat)				

== See also ==
- Ahmednagar district
- List of constituencies of the Lok Sabha
- Shirdi Lok Sabha constituency
