= Kasare, Nandurbar =

Village in Maharashtra

Kasare
- village
- Location in Maharashtra, India Kasare (India)
- Coordinates: 21°17′04″N 73°59′07″E
- Country: India
- State: Maharashtra
- District: Nandurbar
- Taluka: Navapur

Government
  - Body: Village panchayat

Languages
  - Official: Marathi
- Time zone: UTC+5:30 (IST)
- ISO 3166 code: IN-MH
- Vehicle registration: MH
- Lok Sabha constituency: Nandurbar
- Vidhan Sabha constituency: Navapur
- Website: maharashtra.gov.in

Kasare, is a small village in Nandurbar District of Maharashtra, India. Administratively, Kasare is under Shehi gram panchayat, Navapur Taluka of Nandurbar District in Maharashtra. This village is located 2.5 km by road southeast of the village of Shehi, and State Highway 9.

== Demographics ==
In the 2001 census, the village of Kasare had 206 inhabitants, with 96 males (46.6%) and 110 females (53.4%), for a gender ratio of 1146 females per thousand males.

== See also ==
- Navapur
