= Chinchpada =

Village in Maharashtra

- village
- Location in Maharashtra, India Chinchpada (India)
- Coordinates: 21°11′20″N 73°54′38″E
- Country: India
- State: Maharashtra
- District: Nandurbar
- Taluka: Navapur

Government
  - Body: Village panchayat

Population (2001)
  - Total: 6,575

Languages
  - Official: Marathi
- Time zone: UTC+5:30 (IST)
- PIN: 425417
- Telephone code: 02569
- Vehicle registration: MH-39
- Lok Sabha constituency: Nandurbar
- Vidhan Sabha constituency: Navapur

Chinchpada is a panchayat village located in Nashik division of the Kandesh region of Maharashtra state in India. The village used to be called Bodhgaon. Administratively, Chinchpada is under Navapur Taluka, Nandurbar District, Maharashtra. There is only the single village of Chinchpada in the Chinchpada gram panchayat. It is located on National Highway 6, running from Hazira (near Surat) in Gujarat to Kolkota, West Bengal. It is about 100 km from Dhule and about 120 km from Surat.

== Demographics ==
In the 2001 census, the village of Chinchpada had 6,575 inhabitants, with 3,342 males (50.8%) and 3,233 females (49.2%), for a gender ratio of 967 females per thousand males.
