= Shehi =

Village in Maharashtra, India

- village
- Location in Maharashtra, India Shehi (India)
- Coordinates: 21°17′47″N 73°58′20″E
- Country: India
- State: Maharashtra
- District: Nandurbar
- Taluka: Navapur

Government
  - Type: india
  - Body: Village panchayat

Population (2001)
  - Total: 2,101

Languages
  - Official: Marathi Mavchi, Bhil, Vasava, Kokani, Vavuhdi
- Time zone: UTC+5:30 (IST)
- 425416: 425416
- Lok Sabha constituency: Nandurbar
- Vidhan Sabha constituency: Navapur

Shehi is a panchayat village in Maharashtra, India. Administratively, it is under Navapur Taluka of Nandurbar District in Maharashtra.

There are three villages in the Shehi gram panchayat: Shehi, Kasare, and Marod.

== Demographics ==
In the 2001 census, the village of Shehi had 2,101 inhabitants, with 1,030 males (49.0%) and 1,071 females (51.0%), for a gender ratio of 1040 females per thousand males.

== Religion ==
The majority of the people in Kasare are Hindu. There are several temples in the village.

== See also ==
- Navapur
- आदिवासी हाय रा
- हुनाट्या पोयरा
