= East Shahada Sindkheda Nandurbar Assembly constituency =

Constituency of the Maharashtra legislative assembly in India

East Shahada Sindkheda Nandurbar
- Former constituency for the Maharashtra Legislative Assembly

Constituency details
- Country: India
- Region: Western India
- State: Maharashtra
- Established: 1951
- Abolished: 1955
- Total electors: 1,14,701
- Reservation: ST

East Shahada Sindkheda Nandurbar Assembly constituency was an assembly constituency in the India state of Maharashtra. After 1955 Delimitation act, it was split into Shahapur, Sakri, Navapur and Sindkheda.

== Members of the Legislative Assembly ==
Election	Member	Party
1952	Tukaram Huraji Gavit	Indian National Congress
1952	Jay Sinhji Dolatsing Rawal alias Dadasaheb Rawal	Indian National Congress

== Election results ==
=== Assembly Election 1952 ===
1952 Bombay State Legislative Assembly election : East Shahada Sindkheda Nandurbar
Party	Candidate	Votes	%	±%
INC	Tukaram Huraji Gavit	33,225	31.23%	New
INC	Jaisinhji Dolatsing Rawal alias Dadasaheb Rawal	29,665	27.88%	New
SCF	Lalingkar, Punaji Lingaji	14,950	14.05%	New
Socialist	Bhil, Punaji Ziparu	14,542	13.67%	New
Independent	Gavit, Rupa Lalji	7,104	6.68%	New
Independent	Rajput, Vedu Govinda	3,921	3.69%	New
Independent	Girase, Gulabsing Bhila	2,977	2.80%	New
Margin of victory		18,275	17.18%	
Turnout		106,384	46.37%	
Total valid votes		106,384		
Registered electors		114,701		
INC win (new seat)				
