= Akrani Assembly constituency =

Former constituency of the Maharashtra legislative assembly in India

Akrani
- Former constituency for the Maharashtra Legislative Assembly

Constituency details
- Country: India
- Region: Western India
- State: Maharashtra
- Lok Sabha constituency: Nandurbar
- Established: 1962
- Abolished: 2008

Akrani Vidhan Sabha seat was one of the constituencies of Maharashtra Vidhan Sabha, in India. It was a segment of Nandurbar Lok Sabha constituency. Akrani seat existed until the 2004 elections after which it was succeeded by Akkalkuwa Assembly constituency in 2008.

== Members of Legislative Assembly ==
Year	Member	Party
1962	Chandrasing Bhandari	Indian National Congress
1967-1978 : Constituency defunct
1978	Shankar Jadhav	Janata Party
1980	Rameshbhai Pawara	Indian National Congress (I)
1985	Rameshbhai Pawara	Indian National Congress
1990	Kagda Chandya Padvi	Janata Dal
1995	Kagda Chandya Padvi	Independent
1999	Kagda Chandya Padvi	Indian National Congress
2004	Kagda Chandya Padvi	Indian National Congress
2009 onwards : See Akkalkuwa

== Election results ==
=== Assembly Election 2004 ===
2004 Maharashtra Legislative Assembly election : Akrani
Party	Candidate	Votes	%	±%
INC	Kagda Chandya Padvi	38,165	33.85%	▼10.69
SS	Udesingh Kocharu Padvi	20,225	17.94%	▲14.02
Independent	Pyarelal Babulal Patale	18,755	16.64%	New
Independent	Pawar Madan Mithya	16,132	14.31%	New
BSP	Naik Babulal Roopsing	6,142	5.45%	New
Independent	Hirabai Vilas Padvi	6,123	5.43%	New
Independent	Padvi Ravindra Parshi	3,845	3.41%	New
Margin of victory		17,940	15.91%	▲2.55
Turnout		1,12,737	61.42%	▲5.31
Total valid votes		1,12,732		
Registered electors		1,83,550		▲16.56
INC hold		Swing	▼10.69	

=== Assembly Election 1999 ===
1999 Maharashtra Legislative Assembly election : Akrani
Party	Candidate	Votes	%	±%
INC	Kagda Chandya Padvi	39,353	44.54%	▲21.36
NCP	Paradake Rupsing Parashi	27,548	31.18%	New
Independent	Pawara Madan Mitha	8,736	9.89%	New
CPI(M)	Thakare Kessharsing Thunya	4,665	5.28%	New
Independent	Naik Babulal Roopsing	4,589	5.19%	New
SS	Udaysing Mansing Pawara	3,464	3.92%	▼3.50
Margin of victory		11,805	13.36%	▲9.49
Turnout		94,824	60.21%	▼12.98
Total valid votes		88,355		
Registered electors		1,57,478		▲5.44
INC gain from Independent		Swing	▲17.49	

=== Assembly Election 1995 ===
1995 Maharashtra Legislative Assembly election : Akrani
Party	Candidate	Votes	%	±%
Independent	Kagda Chandya Padvi	27,915	27.05%	New
INC	Pawara Rameshbhai Thikya	23,917	23.18%	▼23.63
Independent	Bhandari Tarasing Chandrasing	17,763	17.22%	New
Independent	Sonwane Vaharu Fulsing	11,502	11.15%	New
SS	Babulal Rupsing Naik	7,659	7.42%	▲6.88
JD	Girdhar Fattu Pawar	4,338	4.20%	▼47.85
Independent	Thakare Damu Rama	3,005	2.91%	New
Margin of victory		3,998	3.87%	▼1.37
Turnout		1,09,850	73.55%	▲9.62
Total valid votes		1,03,183		
Registered electors		1,49,347		▲18.95
Independent gain from JD		Swing	▼25.00	

=== Assembly Election 1990 ===
1990 Maharashtra Legislative Assembly election : Akrani
Party	Candidate	Votes	%	±%
JD	Kagda Chandya Padvi	38,872	52.06%	New
INC	Bhandari Tarasing Chandrasing	34,956	46.81%	▼15.13
Margin of victory		3,916	5.24%	▼26.34
Turnout		77,129	61.43%	▲4.35
Total valid votes		74,671		
Registered electors		1,25,556		▲29.96
JD gain from INC		Swing	▼9.88	

=== Assembly Election 1985 ===
1985 Maharashtra Legislative Assembly election : Akrani
Party	Candidate	Votes	%	±%
INC	Pawara Rameshbhai Thikya	32,987	61.94%	New
JP	Appasaheb Shankar Fugara Jadhav	16,165	30.35%	▲4.98
Independent	Gomaji Pukhaji Valvi	1,619	3.04%	New
CPI(M)	Barde Shivdas Kagada	1,504	2.82%	New
Independent	Pawar Bhamatya Nura	982	1.84%	New
Margin of victory		16,822	31.59%	▼7.49
Turnout		55,599	57.55%	▲8.15
Total valid votes		53,257		
Registered electors		96,611		▲11.17
INC gain from INC(I)		Swing	▼2.50	

=== Assembly Election 1980 ===
1980 Maharashtra Legislative Assembly election : Akrani
Party	Candidate	Votes	%	±%
INC(I)	Pawara Rameshbhai Thikya	26,309	64.44%	▲44.06
JP	Pawara Daga Vishram	10,357	25.37%	▼13.47
BJP	Bgamare Jagirdar Parsing	3,675	9.00%	New
Independent	Patale Diwangsing Hari	486	1.19%	New
Margin of victory		15,952	39.07%	▲24.70
Turnout		42,988	49.46%	▼7.45
Total valid votes		40,827		
Registered electors		86,906		▲9.38
INC(I) gain from JP		Swing	▲25.61	

=== Assembly Election 1978 ===
1978 Maharashtra Legislative Assembly election : Akrani
Party	Candidate	Votes	%	±%
JP	Jadhav Shankar Fugara	16,795	38.83%	New
INC	Ukhalde Gosa Rupaji	10,580	24.46%	▼25.18
INC(I)	Patale Diwangsing Hari	8,813	20.38%	New
Independent	Chavan Hasar Basara	3,734	8.63%	New
Independent	Bharibai Mansing Shemale	3,327	7.69%	New
Margin of victory		6,215	14.37%	▼17.36
Turnout		45,784	57.62%	▲17.85
Total valid votes		43,249		
Registered electors		79,454		▲15.07
JP gain from INC		Swing	▼10.81	

=== Assembly Election 1962 ===
1962 Maharashtra Legislative Assembly election : Akrani
Party	Candidate	Votes	%	±%
INC	Chandrasing Dhanaka Bhandari	12,541	49.64%	New
ABJS	Parshi Tetya Pawara	4,525	17.91%	New
RPI	Gosa Rupaji Ukhalde	3,397	13.45%	New
PSP	Punja Chandra Sonawane	2,825	11.18%	New
Independent	Tarasing Singa Thakare	1,975	7.82%	New
Margin of victory		8,016	31.73%	
Turnout		27,766	40.21%	
Total valid votes		25,263		
Registered electors		69,050		
INC win (new seat)				

== See also ==
- List of constituencies of Maharashtra Legislative Assembly
