= Aamshya Padavi =

Indian politician

- आमश्या पाडवी

Member of the Maharashtra Legislative Assembly
- Incumbent
- Assumed office 23 November 2024
- Preceded by: Kagda Chandya Padvi
- Constituency: Akkalkuwa

Member of the Maharashtra Legislative Council
- In office 8 July 2022 – 23 November 2024
- Succeeded by: Chandrakant Raghuwanshi

Personal details
- Born: Mumbai, India
- Party: Shiv Sena

Aamshya Phulji Padavi (born 1968) is an Indian politician from Nandurbar district, Maharashtra. He was a member of the Maharashtra Legislative Council. After unsuccessfully contesting the assembly polls from the Akkalkuwa assembly constituency in 2014, and 2019, he won the 2024 Assembly election by a margin of 2,904 votes.

== Early life and education ==
Padavi is from Akkalkuwa, Nandurbar District, Maharashtra. He is the son of Phulji Thoblaya Padvi. He passed Class 4 at Yashwantrao Chavan Open University, Nashik.

== Career ==
Padavi first contested as an MLA on a Shiv Sena ticket in the 2014 Maharashtra Legislative Assembly election and could only finish fourth receiving 10,349 votes behind the winner Kagda Chandya Padvi of the Indian National Congress. He contested unsuccessfully again on a Shiv Sena ticket in the 2019 Assembly election but fared much better losing by a narrow margin of 2096 votes to the same candidate. However, he turned the tables on the Congress candidate and sitting MLA in his third attempt winning the 2024 Assembly election representing Shiv Sena and beat Padvi by a margin of 2,904 votes. Earlier in May 2024, he left SS (UBT) and joined the Shinde faction.

== Positions held ==
- 2014: Appointed Shiv Sena zilla pramukh of Nandurbar district
- 2022: Elected to Maharashtra Legislative Council
