= Ranala =

Ranala Ranala
- town
- Location in Maharashtra, India
- Coordinates: 21°16′N 74°44′E
- Country: India
- State: Maharashtra
- District: Nandurbar

Population
  - Total: 5,253

Languages
  - Official: Marathi, Ahirani, Tamboli language
- Time zone: UTC+5:30 (IST)
- PIN: 425411
- Telephone code: 02564
- Nearest city: Nandurbar
- Website: https://www.facebook.com/groups/ranala/?fref=nf

Ranala is a town in the Nandurbar subdivision of Nandurbar district in Nashik division of Khandesh region of Maharashtra state in India.Ranala village in most Population is "TAMBOLI" Samaj, they are traditional business is Betel leaves farming and sellers.
