= Purushottamnagar =

- Census town
- Location in Maharashtra, India
- Coordinates: 21.5729°N 74.4993°E
- Country: India
- State: Maharashtra
- District: Nandurbar

Population (2001)
  - Total: 3,594

Languages
  - Official: Marathi
- Time zone: UTC+5:30 (IST)

Purushottamnagar is a census town in Nandurbar district in the Indian state of Maharashtra.

== Demographics ==
As of 2001 India census, Purushottamnagar had a population of 3594. Males constitute 53% of the population and females 47%. Purushottamnagar has an average literacy rate of 78%, higher than the national average of 59.5%: male literacy is 83%, and female literacy is 71%. In Purushottamnagar, 10% of the population is under 6 years of age.

Among minority languages, Gujrati/Gujar is spoken by 36.39% of the population, Bhili by 15.97%, and Khandeshi by 22.37%.
