= Manjula Gavit =

Indian politician

Member of the Maharashtra Legislative Assembly
- Incumbent
- Assumed office October 2019
- Preceded by: Dhanaji Sitaram Ahire
- Constituency: Sakri

Manjula Tulshiram Gavit is a politician from Dhule district, Maharashtra. She was a Member of Maharashtra Legislative Assembly from Sakri Vidhan Sabha constituency as an independent member. After being elected she joined Shiv Sena in the presence of Udhav Thackeray. Post-Shiv Sena 2022 split, she joined Shiv Sena on 10/08/2024 in Dhule in presence of Chief Minister Eknath Shinde.

== Positions held ==
- 2019: Elected to Maharashtra Legislative Assembly
- 2024: Re-Elected to Maharashtra Legislative Assembly
