= Nawapur Sakri Assembly constituency =

Constituency of the Maharashtra legislative assembly in India

Nawapur Sakri
- Former constituency for the Maharashtra Legislative Assembly

Constituency details
- Country: India
- Region: Western India
- State: Maharashtra
- Established: 1951
- Abolished: 1955
- Total electors: 1,06,787
- Reservation: ST

Nawapur Sakri Assembly constituency was an assembly constituency in the India state of Maharashtra. After the 1955 Delimitation act, it was split into Navapur and Sakri constituencies.

== Members of the Legislative Assembly ==
Election	Member	Party
1952	Badse, Shankarrao Chindhuji	Peasants and Workers Party of India
1952	Valvi, Surji Lashkari	Peasants and Workers Party of India

== Election results ==
=== Assembly Election 1952 ===
1952 Bombay State Legislative Assembly election : Navapur Sakri
Party	Candidate	Votes	%	±%
PWPI	Badse, Shankarrao Chindhuji	29,007	26.51%	New
PWPI	Valvi, Surji Lashkari	24,257	22.17%	New
INC	Yashvantrao Sakharam Desale	19,098	17.46%	New
INC	Kokani, Dharma Jairam	17,675	16.16%	New
Socialist	Chaudhari, Abramji Dongarsing	13,802	12.62%	New
Independent	Vasave, Sattarsing Sona	5,561	5.08%	New
Margin of victory		9,909	9.06%	
Turnout		109,400	51.22%	
Total valid votes		109,400		
Registered electors		106,787		
PWPI win (new seat)				
