= Akkalkuwa Assembly constituency =

Constituency of the Maharashtra legislative assembly in India

Coordinates: 21.56°N 74.02°E

Akkalkuwa
- Constituency No. 1 for the Maharashtra Legislative Assembly

Constituency details
- Country: India
- Region: Western India
- State: Maharashtra
- District: Nandurbar
- Lok Sabha constituency: Nandurbar
- Established: 2008
- Total electors: 319,481
- Reservation: ST

Member of Legislative Assembly
- 15th Maharashtra Legislative Assembly
- Incumbent Aamshya Padavi
- Party: SHS
- Alliance: NDA
- Elected year: 2024

Akkalkuwa Assembly constituency is one of the 288 Vidhan Sabha constituencies of Maharashtra state in western India. This constituency is located in Nandurbar district and it is reserved for the candidates belonging to the Scheduled Tribes.

== Overview ==
It is part of the Nandurbar Lok Sabha constituency along with another five Vidhan Sabha segments, namely Shahada, Nandurbar and Navapur in the Nandurbar district and Sakri and Shirpur in the Dhule district.

As per orders of Delimitation of Parliamentary and Assembly constituencies Order, 2008, No. 1 Akkalkuwa Assembly constituency is composed of the following: 1. Akkalkuwa Tehsil and 2. Akrani Tehsil of Nandurbar district.

== Members of the Legislative Assembly ==
Year	Member	Party
Before 2008: See Akrani
2009	Kagda Chandya Padvi	Indian National Congress
2014	Kagda Chandya Padvi	Indian National Congress
2019	Kagda Chandya Padvi	Indian National Congress
2024	Aamshya Padavi	Shiv Sena

== Election results ==
=== Assembly Election 2024 ===
2024 Maharashtra Legislative Assembly election : Akkalkuwa
Party	Candidate	Votes	%	±%
SS	Aamshya Padavi	72,629	32.26%	▼8.95
INC	Kagda Chandya Padvi	69,725	30.97%	▼11.31
Independent	Dr. Heena Vijaykumar Gavit	67,031	29.77%	New
BAP	Padmakar Valvi	8,832	3.92%	New
NOTA	None of the Above	5,071	2.25%	▼0.23
Independent	Eng. Jelsing Bijla Pawara	2,911	1.29%	New
Independent	Sushilkumar Jahangir Pawara	2,529	1.12%	New
Independent	Sarya Dharma Padvi	1,473	0.65%	New
Margin of victory		2,904	1.29%	▲0.22
Turnout		230,201	72.05%	▲0.27
Total valid votes		225,130		
Registered electors		319,481		▲14.56
SS gain from INC		Swing	▼10.02	

=== Assembly Election 2019 ===
2019 Maharashtra Legislative Assembly election : Akkalkuwa
Party	Candidate	Votes	%	±%
INC	Kagda Chandya Padvi	82,770	42.28%	▲4.60
SS	Aamshya Padavi	80,674	41.21%	▲35.15
Independent	Nagesh Dilvarsing Padvi	21,664	11.07%	New
NOTA	None of the Above	4,857	2.48%	New
AAP	Adv. Kailas Pratapsing Vasave	4,055	2.07%	New
Independent	Bharat Jalya Pawara	3,784	1.93%	New
Bhartiya Tribal Party	Dr.Sanjay Ravlya Valvi	2,824	1.44%	New
Margin of victory		2,096	1.07%	▼8.16
Turnout		200,712	71.97%	▲1.01
Total valid votes		195,771		
Registered electors		278,888		▲12.88
INC hold		Swing	▲4.60	

=== Assembly Election 2014 ===
2014 Maharashtra Legislative Assembly election : Akkalkuwa
Party	Candidate	Votes	%	±%
INC	Kagda Chandya Padvi	64,410	37.68%	▲1.20
NCP	Paradake Vijaysing Rupsing	48,635	28.45%	New
BJP	Padavi Nagesh Dilwarsing	32,701	19.13%	New
SS	Aamshya Fulji Padavi	10,349	6.05%	▲1.74
Independent	Padavi Narendrasing Bhagatsing	7,905	4.62%	New
NOTA	None of the Above	4,161	2.43%	New
MNS	Mamata Ravindra Valavi	2,026	1.19%	New
Independent	Madan Jahangir Padavi	1,961	1.15%	New
Margin of victory		15,775	9.23%	▲7.44
Turnout		175,204	70.91%	▲0.79
Total valid votes		170,931		
Registered electors		247,070		▲17.92
INC hold		Swing	▲1.20	

=== Assembly Election 2009 ===
2009 Maharashtra Legislative Assembly election : Akkalkuwa
Party	Candidate	Votes	%	±%
INC	Kagda Chandya Padvi	52,273	36.48%	New
Independent	Paradake Vijaysing Rupsing	49,714	34.69%	New
Independent	Padvi Narendrasing Bhagatsing	25,238	17.61%	New
Independent	Valvi Hemant Bhika	6,741	4.70%	New
SS	Valvi Mangalsing Koma	6,184	4.32%	New
BSP	Vasave Abhijeet Atya	3,151	2.20%	New
Margin of victory		2,559	1.79%	
Turnout		143,313	68.40%	
Total valid votes		143,301		
Registered electors		209,521		
INC win (new seat)				

== See also ==
- List of constituencies of Maharashtra Vidhan Sabha
