= Shehhi =

Shehhi or Shehi may refer to:

- Shihhi Arabic, a variety of Arabic spoken in Oman
- al-Shehhi, an Arab tribe of the Arabian peninsula
- Dashnor Shehi, Albanian government minister
- Orges Shehi (born 1977), Albanian footballer
- Shehi, a panchayat village in Nandurbar District, Maharashtra, India
- Marwan al-Shehhi (1978–2001), Emirati hijacker of United Airlines Flight 175
