= Navapur =

Navapur Nawapur
- municipality
- Location in Maharashtra, India
- Coordinates: 21°10′12″N 73°46′48″E
- Country: India
- State: Maharashtra
- District: Nandurbar
- Taluka: Navapur

Population (2025)
  - Total: 48,000

Languages
  - Official: Marathi
- Time zone: UTC+5:30 (IST)
- PIN: 425418
- Telephone code: 91-2569
- Vehicle registration: MH-39
- Nearest city: Nandurbar
- Lok Sabha constituency: Nandurbar
- Vidhan Sabha constituency: Navapur

Navapur is a Municipality and headquarters for Navapur Taluka in Nandurbar district, in the state of Maharashtra, India.

== Geography ==
Navapur municipality is situated on the border with the state of Gujarat. It is approximately 100 km both from Surat and Dhule. Rangavali River passes by Navapur. The railway station of Navapur is built in two states; one half of it is in Maharashtra and the other half is in Gujarat. Even a train which halts at Navapur Railway station is stationed half in Maharashtra and half in Gujarat.

The municipality is overlooked by hills on one side. Navapur is the developing city in Nandurbar district

== History ==
Navapur's history is rooted in its strategic location on ancient trade routes. It once served as a vital stop along the Mughal trade route to Agra, evidenced by the remnants of a serai (inn) and caravan sentry forts. These structures stand as silent witnesses to the town's bustling past as a center of commerce and cultural exchange.

The region's diverse cultural tapestry also reflects the influence of various rulers and communities. The presence of the Bhil tribal community, along with Marathi and Gujarati populations, has shaped Navapur's unique identity.

Christian Missionary Influence

Along with Navapur, the broader region of Khandesh (which includes present-day Navapur) witnessed the arrival of Christian missionaries in the 19th century. These missionaries, often associated with various denominations, established schools, hospitals, and churches in different parts of the region. Their work focused on conversion of Bhil community by showcasing education, healthcare, and social reform, contributing to the development of local communities.

== Economy ==
Navapur thrives as a marketing and processing town for the surrounding agricultural areas. The municipality has agro based industries such as a sugar factory and toor dal mill as well as other food processing facilities. Rentio foods private ltd. is household name in dal business. Agro based industries and related occupations like animal husbandry and poultry farming are practiced by the people here. Desai Poultry Farm was the first poultry farm founded by Shri Hasu Desai at nearby village called Uchchhal.

Light Bazaar is the shopping place for the villagers surrounding Navapur and Uchchhal

The Golden fruit and vegetable company[G.F.C] was started by Abdul Jalil Abdul Gafur Shaikh, on 20 May 1994 at A.P.M.C Navapur is first market in Navapur Taluka, the vegetables and fruits are supplied and purchased to many states like Gujarat, MP, UP ,Karnataka, Rajasthan,Delhi, Panjab,Himachal pardesh and Jammu Kashmir from Navapur market, Navapur is famous for fresh vegetables and fruits. Samir Shaikh,Shakir Shaikh and Furqan Shaikh are also Commission agents and owner of G.F.C Navapur.

The weekly bazaar is called Shanivari i.e. held on each Saturday..

== Transport ==
Navapur has a railway station. It is also well connected for road transport. State transport buses of Maharashtra and Gujarat are available from Navapur to many cities. Maximum number of buses connect three cities Surat, Nandurbar and Dhule. It is connected with Surat - NH-53. The nearest commercial airport is in Surat.

== Demographics ==
In the 2001 census, the municipality of Navapur had 29,979 inhabitants, with 15,427 males (51.5%) and 14,552 females (48.5%), for a gender ratio of 943 females per thousand males. Nawapur had an average literacy rate of 67%, higher than the national average of 59.5%: male literacy was 72%, and female literacy was 62%. In 2001 in Nawapur, 14% of the population was under 6 years of age.

The population is made up of a number of communities, Bhil a tribal community and some Gujarati and Marathi people. People spoke local tribal bhil( ladshi, dogari etc..) languages. Gujarati is spoken by 18.68% of the population.

Year	Male	Female	Total Population	Change	Religion (%)							
Year	Male	Female	Total Population	Change	Hindu	Muslim	Christian	Sikhs	Buddhist	Jain	Other religions and persuasions	Religion not stated
2001	15427	14552	29979	-	72.824	24.824	1.291	0.067	0.527	0.377	0.030	0.060
2011	17487	16720	34207	0.141	68.430	29.210	0.450	0.073	0.392	0.140	0.041	1.263

== Education ==
The Navapur Education Society has its Gujarati, Marathi and English medium schools and Junior Colleges with Arts, Commerce and Science faculty. The institution "Adivasi Seva Sahayak Sanstha" provides higher education facilities. Courses including B.A. M.A. B. Com. B.Sc. D. Ed. B.Ed. are available in Marathi and English medium. Rang Avadhoot College of Commerce is a commerce college in the area in the discipline of Commerce Economics and Accountancy. Vanvasi utksrh samitee provides primary & yoga education. Highschool's in Navapur

1. Shri Shivaji High School & Junior College for Arts, Commerce and Science (Established in 1962)
2. The N.D. & M. Y. Sarvajanik High school And Sheth H.J. Shah Junior College is a Gujarati medium School run by the Navapur Education Society
3. Vanita Vidyalaya
4. Sumanik Vidyalaya
5. .madrsa Darul ehsan[Arbi and Urdu medium..

sarvajanik Gujarathi Highschool

1. Haji Musaj Mulla Sarvajnik Urdu Highschool
2. I.M.Diwan
3. Smt.S.M.Chokhawala Little Angels' Academy {CBSE Board}
4. A.K.Balwa Memorial Junior College, Navapur

and so many Marathi primary and English Medium Schools in Navapur

1. DG Agrawal English Medium School(CBSE)
2. Iqra national Urdu high school navapur.

4.madrsa Darul ehsan[Arbi]. 5 gujrati madhyamic vidyalaya, lakhani park navapur. 6 Vanvasi Utkarsh Samit's Primary School (Marathi Medium)
