= Shirishkumar Surupsing Naik =

Indian politician

Member of the Maharashtra Legislative Assembly
- Incumbent
- Assumed office 2019
- Preceded by: Surupsingh Hirya Naik
- Constituency: Nawapur

Personal details
- Born: 18 July 1972 (age 54) Navagaon, Navapur taluka, Nandurbar District
- Party: Indian National Congress
- Parent: Surupsingh Hirya Naik
- Profession: Politician

Shirishkumar Surupsing Naik is an Indian politician who is serving as Member of 14th Maharashtra Legislative Assembly from Navapur Assembly constituency.
