= Names of Beijing =

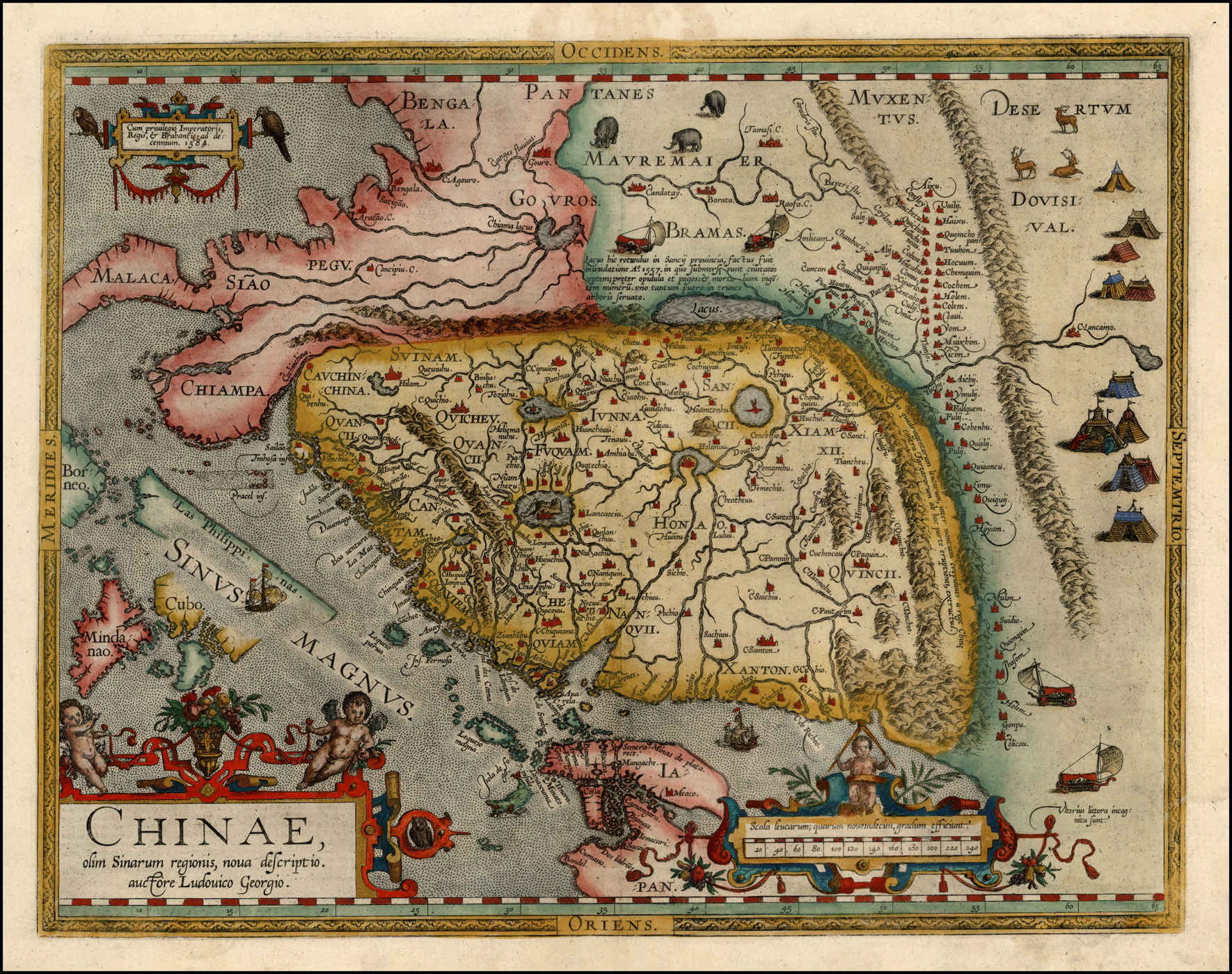
A 1584 map of China by Abraham Ortelius (based on a manuscript map by Luiz Jorge de Barbuda (Ludovicus Georgius), with Beijing marked as C[ivitas] Paquin (to the right which is north on the map)

"Beijing" is from pinyin Běijīng, which is romanized from 北京, the Chinese name for this city. The pinyin system of transliteration was approved by the Chinese government in 1958, but the pinyin romanization of the city was little used by either the Chinese government or the international community until 1979.

== Etymology ==
The Chinese characters 北 ("north") and 京 ("capital") together mean the "Northern Capital". The name was first used during the reign of the Ming dynasty's Yongle Emperor, who made his northern fief a second capital, along with Nanjing (南京, the "Southern Capital"), in 1403 after successfully dethroning his nephew during the Jingnan Campaign. The name was restored in 1949 at the founding of the People's Republic of China.

== Peking ==
Portugal was the first European country to contact China in modern times. In Portuguese, the city is called Pequim. This name appeared in the letters of Francis Xavier in 1552. It transferred to English as "Pekin" and to French as Pékin.

Jesuit missionary Martino Martini used "Peking" in De bello Tartarico historia (The Tartary [Manchu] War) (1654) and Novus Atlas Sinensis (New Atlas of China) (1655). In 1665, Martini's work was reissued as part of Atlas Maior (great atlas), a much-praised atlas by Dutch publisher Joan Blaeu.

In English, both "Pekin" and "Peking" remained common until the 1890s, when the Imperial Post Office adopted Peking.

Beginning in 1979, the PRC government encouraged use of pinyin. The New York Times adopted "Beijing" in November 1986. The Associated Press and United Press International, which provided most world news coverage in American media, jointly agreed to adopt the "Beijing" spelling beginning on 1 March 1987. The BBC switched in 1990. "Peking" is still employed in terms such as "Pekingese", "Peking duck", "Peking Man" and various others, as well as being retained in the name of Peking University.

== Historical names of Beijing ==
Historical Names of Beijing
| Year | City Name | Dynasty | Notes |
|---|---|---|---|
| c. 1045; BC | City of Ji 薊城 | Zhou, Warring States | (Note: The City of Ji was the capital of the States of Ji and Yan.) |
| 221 BC | City of Ji 薊城 | Qin | (Note: During the Qin dynasty, the City of Ji served as the regional capital of the Guangyang Commandery (广阳郡).) |
| 106 BC - 318 AD | City of Ji; Youzhou 幽州 | Han, Wei, Western Jin (晉) | (Note: During the Eastern Han dynasty, Youzhou, as one of 12 prefectures, contained a dozen subordinate commanderies, including the Guangyang Commandery. In 24 AD, Liu Xiu moved Youzhou's prefectural seat from Ji County (in modern-day Tianjin) to the City of Ji (in modern-day Beijing). In 96 AD, the City of Ji served as the seat of both the Guangyang Commandery and Youzhou. The Wei Kingdom reorganized and decentralized the governance of commanderies under Youzhou. Guangyang Commandery became the State of Yan (燕国), which had four counties: Ji County, Changping, Jundu and Guangyang County, and was governed from the City of Ji. Fanyang Commandery was governed from Zhuo County. Yuyang Commandery was governed from Yuyuang (in modern-day Huairou District of Beijing), Shanggu Commandery was governed from Juyong (in modern-day Yanqing County of Beijing).) |
| 319 | City of Ji; Youzhou 幽州 | Later Zhao | (Note: In 319, Shi Le captured Youzhou from Duan Pidi) |
| 350 | City of Ji; Youzhou 幽州 | Eastern Jin (晉) | (Note: In 350, Murong Jun captured Youzhou in the name of restoring northern China to Jin rule.) |
| 352–57 | City of Ji; Youzhou 幽州 | Former Yan | (Note: From 352 to 357, the Former Yan made the city of Ji its capital.) |
| 370 | City of Ji; Youzhou 幽州 | Former Qin | (Note: In 319, Shi Le captured Youzhou from Duan Pidi) |
| 385 | City of Ji; Youzhou 幽州 | Later Yan | (Note: In the second lunar month of 385, Murong Chui seized Youzhou from Former Qin.) |
| 397 | City of Ji; Youzhou 幽州 | Northern Dynasties | (Note: In 397 AD, the Northern Wei captured Ji from the Later Yan and went on to establish the first of the Northern Dynasties.) |
| 607 | Zhuojun 涿郡 | Sui | (Note: During the Sui dynasty, Youzhou became Zhuojun or Zhuo Commandery.) |
| 616 | Youzhou | Tang | (Note: During the Tang dynasty, the seat of the government of Youzhou remained in place but took on slightly different names. In 616, the government was called Youzhou Zongguanfu (幽州总管府); in 622, Youzhou Dazongguanfu (幽州大总管府); in 624, Youzhou Dadudufu (幽州大都督府) and in 626, Youzhou Dudufu (幽州都督府). From 710, the head of the government in Youzhou became a jiedushi, a military regional commander. In 742, Youzhou was renamed Fanyang Commandery (范阳郡). In 759, during the An-Shi Rebellion, Shi Siming declared himself emperor of the Great Yan dynasty and made Fanyang, Yanjing or "the Yan Capital." After the rebellion was suppressed, the seat of government became Youzhou Lulong Dudufu (幽州卢龙都督府).) |
| 742 | Fanyang 範陽 | Tang | |
| 759 | Yanjing 燕京 | Tang | |
| 765 | Youzhou | Tang | |
| 907 | Youzhou | Later Liang | |
| 911 | Youzhou | Yan (Five Dynasties) | |
| 913 | Youzhou | Later Liang | |
| 923 | Youzhou | Later Tang | |
| 936 | Youzhou | Later Jin | |
| 938 | Nanjing 南京 | Liao | (Note: The seat of government in Nanjing was known as Youdufu (幽都府) until 1012, when the name was changed to Xijinfu (析津府).) |
| 1122 | Nanjing 南京 | Northern Liao | |
| 1122 | Yanjing | Jin (金) | |
| 1122 | Yanjing | Jin (金) | |
| 1123 | Yanshan 燕山 | Song | |
| 1125 | Yanjing | Jin (金) | |
| 1151 | Zhongdu 中都 | Jin (金) | (Note: After 1151, the capital of the Jin dynasty from Shangjing to Yanjing, which was renamed Zhongdu. Zhongdu refers to the Zhongdulu (中都路), an administrative unit which governed about 12 surrounding prefectures and 39 counties. The governing seat of Zhongdulu was Daxingfu (大兴府).) |
| 1215 | Yanjing | Yuan | |
| 1271 | Dadu 大都 | Yuan | |
| 1368 | Peiping 北平 | Ming | (Note: The seat of government in Beiping, later Beijing, was called Shuntianfu (顺天府).) |
| 1403 | Shuntian 順天 | Ming | (Note: The seat of government in Beiping, later Beijing, was called Shuntianfu (顺天府).) |
| 1421 | Shuntian 順天 | Ming | (Note: The seat of government in Beiping, later Beijing, was called Shuntianfu (顺天府).) |
| 1644 | Shuntian 順天 | Qing | |
| 1912 | Shuntian 順天 | Republic of China | |
| 1914 | Jingzhao 京兆地方 | Republic of China | |
| 1928 | Peiping | Republic of China | |
| 1937 | Peking | Provisional Government (Japanese occupation) | (Note: From 1938 to 1940 the city was renamed Peking by the Provisional Government of the Republic of China, a puppet regime backed by the Japanese occupation. From 1940 to 1945, It was controlled by the Wang Jingwei regime, which is also a Japanese puppet regime. Japan surrendered in 1945. The city's name reverted to Peiping after After the National Army's liberation.) |
| 1940 | Peking | Wang regime (Japanese occupation) | (Note: From 1938 to 1940 the city was renamed Peking by the Provisional Government of the Republic of China, a puppet regime backed by the Japanese occupation. From 1940 to 1945, It was controlled by the Wang Jingwei regime, which is also a Japanese puppet regime. Japan surrendered in 1945. The city's name reverted to Peiping after After the National Army's liberation.) |
| 1945 | Peiping | Republic of China | (Note: From 1938 to 1940 the city was renamed Peking by the Provisional Government of the Republic of China, a puppet regime backed by the Japanese occupation. From 1940 to 1945, It was controlled by the Wang Jingwei regime, which is also a Japanese puppet regime. Japan surrendered in 1945. The city's name reverted to Peiping after After the National Army's liberation.) |
| 1949– present | Beijing | People's Republic of China | |
Capital of regional dynasty or kingdom Capital of China

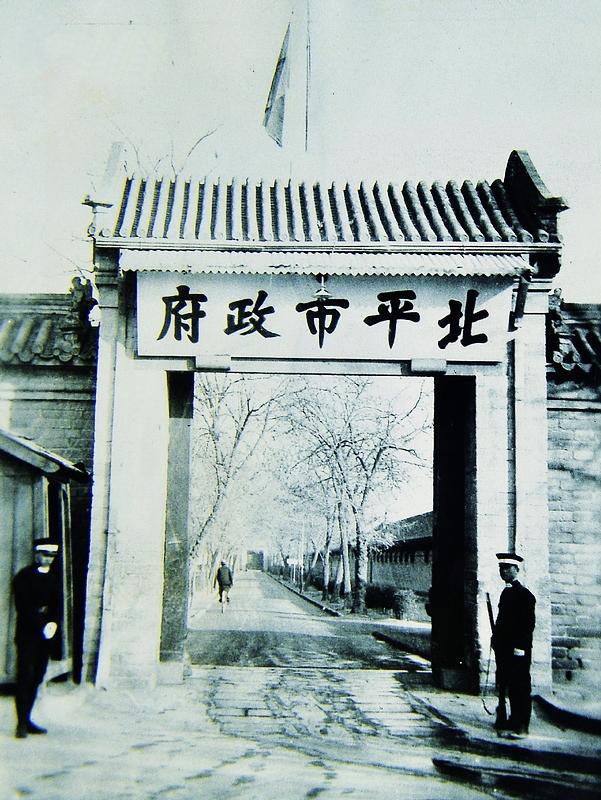
Entrance to the Peiping City Government office, 1935

The city has had many other names. The chronological list below sets out both the names of the city itself, and, in earlier times, the names of the administrative entities covering the city today.

- Ji: The first major known settlement was the eponymous capital of the ancient Ji state between the 11th and 7th centuries BC. The settlement was also known as Jicheng. It was located in the current city's Guang'anmen neighborhood south of the Beijing West railway station.
  - Ji: simplified Chinese: 蓟; traditional Chinese: 薊; pinyin: Jì; Wade–Giles: Chi
  - Jicheng: Chinese: 薊城; pinyin: Jìchéng; Wade–Giles: Chi-cheng; lit. 'Ji Walled City'
  - Jixian: simplified Chinese: 蓟县; traditional Chinese: 薊縣; pinyin: Jìxiàn; Wade–Giles: Chi-hsien; lit. 'Ji County'
- Yan: Ji was conquered by Yan around the 7th century BC but was employed as its conqueror's new capital. Although the official name remained as Ji, the city also became known as Yan and Yanjing ("Capital of Yan"). The name was employed in the titles of An Lushan (as Emperor of Yan), Liu Rengong (as King of Yan), and the Princes of Yan. The Khitans of the 10th- to 12th-century Liao dynasty fully restored the name Yanjing, and it remains a name for Beijing in literary usage today, as reflected in the locally brewed Yanjing Beer and the former Yenching University (since merged into Peking University).
  - Yan: Chinese: 燕; pinyin: Yān; Wade–Giles: Yen
  - Yanjing: Chinese: 燕京; pinyin: Yānjīng
- Guangyang: After the Qin conquest, Ji was made the capital of the Guangyang Commandery.
  - simplified Chinese: 广阳郡; traditional Chinese: 廣陽郡; pinyin: Guǎngyángjùn; Wade–Giles: Kuang-yang Chün
- Youzhou and Fanyang: Under the Tang dynasty, being the seat of the You Prefecture, the city generally employed Youzhou as its name. During the Tianbao Era of Emperor Xuanzong, however, You Prefecture was renamed Fanyang Commandery, and the name Fanyang became associated with the city as well.
  - Chinese: 幽州; pinyin: Yōuzhōu; Wade–Giles: Yu-chou
  - simplified Chinese: 范阳; traditional Chinese: 范陽; pinyin: Fànyáng; Wade–Giles: Fan-yang
- Nanjing: In the 10th and 12th centuries, the northerly Liao dynasty restored the name Yanjing. They also knew the city as Nanjing as it was the southernmost of their secondary capitals.
  - Chinese: 南京; pinyin: Nánjīng; Wade–Giles: Nan-ching
- Zhongdu: During the 12th-century Later Jin dynasty, it was known as Zhongdu.
  - Chinese: 中都; pinyin: Zhōngdū; lit. 'Central Capital'
- Khanbaliq: The Mongolian Yuan dynasty originally restored the name Yanjing before constructing a new capital adjacent to the former settlement. This settlement was called Dadu in Chinese and Daidu in Mongolian. (As Khanbaliq, it was noted as Cambuluc by Marco Polo.) This city gradually absorbed the former settlements around the area.
  - Chinese: 大都; pinyin: Dàdū; lit. 'Great Capital'
- Peiping: Under the Ming dynasty, the city itself was initially known as Peiping, or in pinyin, Beiping. The name reads literally as "Northern Peace", although its usage and connotations are closer to the idea of "Northern Plains".
  - Chinese: 北平; pinyin: Běipíng; Wade–Giles: Pei-p'ing; lit. 'Northern Peace'
- Shuntian: When the usurping Yongle Emperor established his base of Beiping as a secondary capital in 1403, he renamed the town Shuntian and the province surrounding it Beizhili to mimic the names of Yingtian (modern Nanjing) and the province of Zhili that surrounds it.
  - Shuntian: simplified Chinese: 顺天; traditional Chinese: 順天; pinyin: Shùntiān; Wade–Giles: Shün-t'ien; lit. 'Obedient to Heaven'
- Jingshi and Beijing: When the palace was finally completed in 1420, the Yongle Emperor moved the majority of his court north. The name Jingshi ceased to be used for Yingtian and was now employed for Shuntian. The area around Yingtian became known as Nanjing while Beijing was used to describe the area directly administered by the capital (generally modern Hebei).
  - Jingshi: simplified Chinese: 京师; traditional Chinese: 京師; pinyin: Jīngshī; Wade–Giles: Ching-shih; lit. 'Capital'
- Jingdu: Chinese: 京都; pinyin: Jīngdū; Wade–Giles: Ching-tu; lit. 'Capital City') was declared the official name of Beijing by the Beiyang government in January 1918, and remained so until 1928. Westerners continued to call the city Peking.
- Peiping, in both its connotations, was restored as the name in 1928 by the Republic of China following its reconquest of Peking from the warlords during the Northern Expedition. The occupying Japanese in 1938 imposed the name Peking, then with their surrender in 1945, the Nationalist Government restored "Peiping" by 1 September 1945. In 1949, the official name again reverted to "Peking" (the Postal Romanization) when the Chinese Communist Party conquered it during the Chinese Civil War and made it capital of their newly founded People's Republic of China. As noted above, the pinyin romanization, "Beijing", was adopted for use within the country in 1958, and gradually for international use since 1979. The United States government continued to follow the Republic of China government in using "Peiping" until the late 1960s.
  - Chinese: 北平; pinyin: Běipíng

== Abbreviation ==
In Chinese, the abbreviation of Beijing is its second character 京 ("Capital"). This is employed, for example, as the prefix on all Beijing-issued license plates.

In the Latin alphabet, the official abbreviation are the two initials of the region's characters: BJ.

Beijing Capital International Airport's IATA code is PEK, based on the previous romanization, Peking. The new airport, Beijing Daxing International Airport, uses PKX as its code.

== Similarly named cities ==
The history of China since the Tang dynasty has also been full of secondary capitals with directional names. Under the Tang, these were Beidu ("north capital", at Taiyuan in Shanxi); Nandu ("south capital", first, Chengdu in Sichuan and, later, Jiangling in Hubei); Dongdu ("east capital", Luoyang in Henan); and Xidu ("west capital", Fengxiang in Shaanxi).

There were two previous Beijings: one, the northern capital of the Northern Song at modern Daming in Hebei; the other, the northern capital of the Jurchen Jin located at Ningcheng in Inner Mongolia.

The Nanjing of the Northern Song was located at Shangqiu in Henan. The Jurchen Jin located theirs at Kaifeng,) which had been the Northern Song's "Dongjing". The Jurchen Jin also had a Dongjing ("Eastern Capital"), which was, however, located at Liaoyang in Liaoning. Apart from these, there were two Xijings (西京, "Western Capital"): one was the "Western Capital" of the Northern Song dynasty, located at Luoyang; the other was held by the Liao and Jurchen Jin at Datong. Liaoyang was the Zhongjing (中京, "Central Capital") of the Liao dynasty and, finally, another Zhongdu ("Central Capital") was planned but never completed. It was the proposed capital of the Ming dynasty mooted by the Hongwu Emperor in the 14th century, to be located on the site of his destroyed childhood village of Zhongli (鍾離), now Fengyang in Anhui.
