= Kashiram Vechan Pawara =

Indian politician

Member of the Maharashtra Legislative Assembly
- Incumbent
- Assumed office 2009
- Preceded by: Amrish Patel
- Constituency: Shirpur

Personal details
- Party: Bharatiya Janata Party
- Other political affiliations: Indian National Congress
- Profession: Politician

Kashiram Vechan Pawara is a member of the 13th Maharashtra Legislative Assembly. He represents the Shirpur Assembly constituency. He joined Bharatiya Janata Party ahead of the 2019 Maharashtra Legislative Assembly election. Pawara was also Member of Legislative Assembly from Shirpur in 2009. He belonged to the INC then too. Now Kashiram Pawara joins BJP.

== Personal life ==
He is from Sule Kangai village in Dhule District, Maharashtra. Once he visited Kangai village, he started the speech about his development program. He said "I wasted my five years for understanding what is politics, now this time give me vote for your valuable development".
