= Sakri Assembly constituency =

Constituency of the Maharashtra legislative assembly in India

Coordinates: 20.99°N 74.32°E

Sakri
- Constituency No. 5 for the Maharashtra Legislative Assembly

Constituency details
- Country: India
- Region: Western India
- State: Maharashtra
- District: Dhule
- Lok Sabha constituency: Nandurbar
- Established: 1951
- Total electors: 365,748
- Reservation: ST

Member of Legislative Assembly
- 15th Maharashtra Legislative Assembly
- Incumbent Manjula Gavit
- Party: SHS
- Alliance: NDA
- Elected year: 2024

Sakri Assembly constituency is one of the 288 Vidhan Sabha constituencies of Maharashtra state in western India. This constituency is located in Dhule district and it is reserved for the candidates belonging to the Scheduled Tribes.

== Overview ==
It is part of the Nandurbar Lok Sabha constituency along with five other Vidhan Sabha constituencies, namely Shirpur in Dhule district and Akkalkuwa, Navapur, Nandurbar and Shahada in Nandurbar district.

As per orders of Delimitation of Parliamentary and Assembly constituencies Order, 2008, No. 6 Sakri Assembly constituency is composed of the following: Sakri Tehsil (excluding Dusane Circle). of Dhule district.

== Members of the Legislative Assembly ==
Year	Member	Party
From 1952 - 1957 see: Nawapur Sakri
1952	Bedase Shankerrao Chindhuji	Peasants and Workers Party of India
1957	Bedase Shankerrao Chindhuji; Padawi Rama Jirya	Independent politician
1962	Gokul Rupla Gavit	Indian National Congress
1967	U. R. Nandre	Communist Party of India
1972	Gojarbai Ramrao Bhamre	Indian National Congress
1978	Malusare Sukram Bhurya	Indian National Congress (I)
1980	Malusare Sukram Bhurya	Indian National Congress (I)
1985	Govindrao Shivram Chaudhary	Bharatiya Janata Party
1990	Govindrao Shivram Chaudhary	Bharatiya Janata Party
1995	Govindrao Shivram Chaudhary	Bharatiya Janata Party
1999	Suryavanshi Vasant Dodha	Bharipa Bahujan Mahasangh
2004	Dhanaji Sitaram Ahire	Indian National Congress
2009	Bhoye Yogendra Reshama	Indian National Congress
2014	Dhanaji Sitaram Ahire	Indian National Congress
2019	Manjula Tulshiram Gavit	Independent politician
2024	Manjula Tulshiram Gavit	Shiv Sena

== Election results ==
=== Assembly Election 2024 ===
2024 Maharashtra Legislative Assembly election : Sakri
Party	Candidate	Votes	%	±%
SS	Manjula Tulshiram Gavit	104,649	43.40%	New
INC	Pravin (Gotu) Bapu Chaure	99,065	41.09%	▲28.68
Independent	Er. Mohan Gokul Suryawanshi	14,288	5.93%	New
PWPI	Yashvant Devman Malche	5,468	2.27%	New
Independent	Ranjit Bhivraj Gaikwad	3,535	1.47%	New
Independent	Vaishali Vishvjit Raut	2,185	0.91%	New
Maharashtra Swarajya Party	Ashok Ragho Sonawane	2,139	0.89%	New
NOTA	None of the Above	1,138	0.47%	▼1.56
Margin of victory		5,584	2.32%	▼1.25
Turnout		2,42,253	66.23%	▲6.46
Total valid votes		2,41,115		
Registered electors		3,65,748		▲6.63
SS gain from Independent		Swing	▲6.06	

=== Assembly Election 2019 ===
2019 Maharashtra Legislative Assembly election : Sakri
Party	Candidate	Votes	%	±%
Independent	Manjula Tulshiram Gavit	76,166	37.35%	New
BJP	Mohan Gokul Suryawanshi	68,901	33.78%	▼4.06
INC	Dhanaji Sitaram Ahire	25,302	12.41%	▼27.19
VBA	Yashwant Devman Malache	14,032	6.88%	New
Independent	Rajkumar Pandit Sonawane	9,058	4.44%	New
NOTA	None of the Above	4,147	2.03%	▲0.36
Bhartiya Tribal Party	Nandu Rajaram Malache	3,743	1.84%	New
Independent	Hiraman Deva Sabale	2,872	1.41%	New
Margin of victory		7,265	3.56%	▲1.80
Turnout		2,08,240	60.71%	▼1.91
Total valid votes		2,03,951		
Registered electors		3,42,992		▲11.51
Independent gain from INC		Swing	▼2.25	

=== Assembly Election 2014 ===
2014 Maharashtra Legislative Assembly election : Sakri
Party	Candidate	Votes	%	±%
INC	Dhanaji Sitaram Ahire	74,760	39.60%	▼1.39
BJP	Gavit Manjula Tulshiram	71,437	37.84%	▲10.35
SS	Pawar Chudaman Daga	12,832	6.80%	New
NCP	Naike Dilip Shashikumar	12,398	6.57%	New
PWPI	Dipak Mangya Jagtap	6,832	3.62%	▼1.55
NOTA	None of the Above	3,152	1.67%	New
MNS	Bharude Dipak Bandu	2,987	1.58%	New
BBM	Chavhan Suka Budha	1,980	1.05%	New
Margin of victory		3,323	1.76%	▼11.73
Turnout		1,92,010	62.42%	▲12.02
Total valid votes		1,88,791		
Registered electors		3,07,595		▲8.15
INC hold		Swing	▼1.39	

=== Assembly Election 2009 ===
2009 Maharashtra Legislative Assembly election : Sakri
Party	Candidate	Votes	%	±%
INC	Bhoye Yogendra Reshama	57,542	40.99%	▼5.96
BJP	Gavit Manjula Tulshiram	38,598	27.49%	▼8.05
Independent	Chaudhri Govindrao Shivram ( Bhau)	15,936	11.35%	New
Independent	Suryavanshi Vasant Dodha	8,438	6.01%	New
PWPI	Jagtap Dipak Mangya	7,262	5.17%	New
Independent	Ushabai Ramrao Gavale	1,989	1.42%	New
BSP	Malusare Dadu Sursingh	1,943	1.38%	▼0.65
Margin of victory		18,944	13.49%	▲2.09
Turnout		1,40,405	49.37%	▼9.42
Total valid votes		1,40,386		
Registered electors		2,84,411		▲24.92
INC hold		Swing	▼5.96	

=== Assembly Election 2004 ===
2004 Maharashtra Legislative Assembly election : Sakri
Party	Candidate	Votes	%	±%
INC	Dhanaji Sitaram Ahire	62,823	46.94%	New
BJP	Chaudhari Govindrao Shivram	47,561	35.54%	▲3.13
Independent	Pawar Kailas Devaji	13,173	9.84%	New
Independent	Pawar Zingubai Kaluram	3,515	2.63%	New
BSP	Bhupendra Govindrao Jadhav	2,723	2.03%	New
Independent	Chaure Appa Shantaram	1,468	1.10%	New
BBM	Gangurde Gangaram Bandu	1,237	0.92%	▼39.57
Margin of victory		15,262	11.40%	▲3.32
Turnout		1,33,838	58.79%	▲12.90
Total valid votes		1,33,823		
Registered electors		2,27,669		▲15.93
INC gain from BBM		Swing	▲6.45	

=== Assembly Election 1999 ===
1999 Maharashtra Legislative Assembly election : Sakri
Party	Candidate	Votes	%	±%
BBM	Suryavanshi Vasant Dodha	36,481	40.49%	New
BJP	Anil Sukram Bagul	29,195	32.41%	▼10.10
NCP	Chaudhari Govindrao Shivram	23,221	25.77%	New
Independent	Thakare Mothaji Tukaram	1,195	1.33%	New
Margin of victory		7,286	8.09%	▼0.39
Turnout		97,871	49.84%	▼14.39
Total valid votes		90,092		
Registered electors		1,96,385		▲4.42
BBM gain from BJP		Swing	▼2.01	

=== Assembly Election 1995 ===
1995 Maharashtra Legislative Assembly election : Sakri
Party	Candidate	Votes	%	±%
BJP	Govindrao Shivram Chaudhary	48,182	42.51%	▲6.76
INC	Bhoye Reshma Motiram	38,578	34.03%	▼1.57
Independent	Gangurde Shantaram Chindhu	12,154	10.72%	New
BSP	Bagul Dongar Kanhaiya	7,428	6.55%	New
Independent	Malche Bhika Sakharam	2,471	2.18%	New
Independent	Malusare Suresh Sukram	1,981	1.75%	New
Independent	Ambar Barik Thakare	1,539	1.36%	New
Margin of victory		9,604	8.47%	▲8.34
Turnout		1,18,051	62.77%	▲9.80
Total valid votes		1,13,349		
Registered electors		1,88,078		▲15.39
BJP hold		Swing	▲6.76	

=== Assembly Election 1990 ===
1990 Maharashtra Legislative Assembly election : Sakri
Party	Candidate	Votes	%	±%
BJP	Govindrao Shivram Chaudhary	29,402	35.75%	▼28.81
INC	Chaure Bapu Hari	29,289	35.61%	▲1.87
JD	Bagul Dongar Kanhaiya	10,102	12.28%	New
Independent	Suryawanshi Vasantrao Dodha	7,603	9.24%	New
Independent	Malusare Sukram Bhurya	4,401	5.35%	New
Independent	Gavit Kamalabai Govindrao	553	0.67%	New
Margin of victory		113	0.14%	▼30.67
Turnout		84,456	51.82%	▼7.80
Total valid votes		82,252		
Registered electors		1,62,995		▲24.20
BJP hold		Swing	▼28.81	

=== Assembly Election 1985 ===
1985 Maharashtra Legislative Assembly election : Sakri
Party	Candidate	Votes	%	±%
BJP	Govindrao Shivram Chaudhary	49,359	64.55%	▲27.37
INC	Malusare Sukram Bhurya	25,799	33.74%	New
Independent	Kokani Tejaram Baliram	497	0.65%	New
Margin of victory		23,560	30.81%	▲24.79
Turnout		78,981	60.18%	▲15.69
Total valid votes		76,463		
Registered electors		1,31,239		▲10.69
BJP gain from INC(I)		Swing	▲21.35	

=== Assembly Election 1980 ===
1980 Maharashtra Legislative Assembly election : Sakri
Party	Candidate	Votes	%	±%
INC(I)	Malusare Sukram Bhurya	21,807	43.20%	▲9.95
BJP	Koli Baburao Rangrao	18,768	37.18%	New
Independent	Chaure Bapu Hari	7,117	14.10%	New
Independent	Bagul Dongar Kanaiya	1,969	3.90%	New
[[Janata Party (Secular) Charan Singh|Janata Party (Secular) Charan Singh]]	Thakur Balchandra Punju	813	1.61%	New
Margin of victory		3,039	6.02%	▲4.27
Turnout		52,224	44.05%	▼11.37
Total valid votes		50,474		
Registered electors		1,18,569		▲8.67
INC(I) hold		Swing	▲9.95	

=== Assembly Election 1978 ===
1978 Maharashtra Legislative Assembly election : Sakri
Party	Candidate	Votes	%	±%
INC(I)	Malusare Sukram Bhurya	19,569	33.25%	New
INC	Choudhari Govindrao Shivram	18,540	31.50%	▼28.79
Independent	Chaure Sonu Bapu	12,350	20.99%	New
CPI(M)	Bagul Dongar Kannayya	5,654	9.61%	New
CPI	Bhavre Govinda Elaji	2,737	4.65%	▼32.06
Margin of victory		1,029	1.75%	▼21.83
Turnout		62,038	56.86%	▼2.93
Total valid votes		58,850		
Registered electors		1,09,112		▲12.77
INC(I) gain from INC		Swing	▼27.04	

=== Assembly Election 1972 ===
1972 Maharashtra Legislative Assembly election : Sakri
Party	Candidate	Votes	%	±%
INC	Gojarbai Ramrao Bhamre	33,173	60.29%	▲18.86
CPI	Jagannath T. Desale	20,201	36.71%	▼14.87
Independent	Karade Dadarao Ramji	1,648	3.00%	New
Margin of victory		12,972	23.58%	▲13.42
Turnout		57,923	59.86%	▼4.38
Total valid votes		55,022		
Registered electors		96,758		▲10.19
INC gain from CPI		Swing	▲8.71	

=== Assembly Election 1967 ===
1967 Maharashtra Legislative Assembly election : Sakri
Party	Candidate	Votes	%	±%
CPI	U. R. Nandre	27,742	51.58%	▲22.03
INC	K. S. Devre	22,282	41.43%	▼10.54
Independent	B. D. Rajput	1,975	3.67%	New
Independent	A. B. Nilay	1,783	3.32%	New
Margin of victory		5,460	10.15%	▼12.27
Turnout		58,036	66.09%	▲16.26
Total valid votes		53,782		
Registered electors		87,810		▲2.48
CPI gain from INC		Swing	▼0.39	

=== Assembly Election 1962 ===
1962 Maharashtra Legislative Assembly election : Sakri
Party	Candidate	Votes	%	±%
INC	Gokul Rupla Gavit	20,032	51.97%	▲31.75
CPI	Hiraman Bhavadu Pawar	11,390	29.55%	New
Independent	Bhatu Lakha Pawar	4,913	12.75%	New
PSP	Daval Zelya Pawar	1,619	4.20%	New
Independent	Tulya Malya Bhavare	589	1.53%	New
Margin of victory		8,642	22.42%	▲22.09
Turnout		43,195	50.41%	▼63.00
Total valid votes		38,543		
Registered electors		85,683		▼30.83
INC gain from Independent		Swing	▲20.57	

=== Assembly Election 1957 ===
1957 Bombay State Legislative Assembly election : Sakri
Party	Candidate	Votes	%	±%
Independent	Bedase Shankerrao Chindhuji	42,000	31.40%	New
Independent	Padawi Rama Jirya (St)	41,554	31.07%	New
INC	Yashvantrao Sakharam Desale	27,044	20.22%	New
INC	Gavit Tukaram Huraji (St)	23,159	17.31%	New
Margin of victory		446	0.33%	
Turnout		1,33,757	107.98%	
Total valid votes		1,33,757		
Registered electors		1,23,868		
Independent win (new seat)				

== See also ==
- Sakri
- List of constituencies of Maharashtra Vidhan Sabha
