= Shirpur Assembly constituency =

Constituency of the Maharashtra legislative assembly in India

Coordinates: 21.35°N 74.89°E

Shirpur
- Constituency No. 9 for the Maharashtra Legislative Assembly

Constituency details
- Country: India
- Region: Western India
- State: Maharashtra
- District: Dhule
- Lok Sabha constituency: Nandurbar
- Established: 1952
- Total electors: 351,226
- Reservation: ST

Member of Legislative Assembly
- 15th Maharashtra Legislative Assembly
- Incumbent Kashiram Vechan Pawara
- Party: BJP
- Alliance: NDA
- Elected year: 2024

Shirpur Assembly constituency is one of the 288 Vidhan Sabha constituencies of Maharashtra state in western India. This constituency is located in Dhule district and is currently reserved for candidates belonging to the Scheduled Tribes.

== Overview ==
It is part of Nandurbar Lok Sabha constituency along with another five Vidhan Sabha constituencies, namely Sakri in Dhule district and Akkalkuwa, Navapur, Nandurbar and Shahada in Nandurbar district.

== Members of the Legislative Assembly ==
Election	Member	Party
1952	Mali, Gajmal Dalpat	Indian National Congress
1962	Vyankatrao Tanaji Dhobi	Indian National Congress
1967	Shivajirao Girdhar Patil	Indian National Congress
1972	Shivajirao Girdhar Patil	Indian National Congress
1978	Pralhadrao Madhavrao Patil	Janata Party
1980	Rajput Indrasing Chandrasing	Indian National Congress
1985	Patil Sambhaji Hiraman	Janata Party
1990	Amrishbhai Rasiklal Patel	Indian National Congress
1995	Amrishbhai Rasiklal Patel	Indian National Congress
1999	Amrishbhai Rasiklal Patel	Indian National Congress
2004	Amrishbhai Rasiklal Patel	Indian National Congress
2009	Kashiram Vechan Pawara	Indian National Congress
2014	Kashiram Vechan Pawara	Indian National Congress
2019	Kashiram Vechan Pawara	Bharatiya Janata Party
2024	Kashiram Vechan Pawara	Bharatiya Janata Party

== Election results ==
=== Assembly Election 2024 ===
2024 Maharashtra Legislative Assembly election : Shirpur
Party	Candidate	Votes	%	±%
BJP	Kashiram Vechan Pawara	178,073	77.59%	▲19.78
Independent	Dr. Jitendra Yuvraj Thakur	32,129	14.00%	New
CPI	Budha Mala Pawara	10,038	4.37%	▲3.35
Independent	Advocate Varsha Ramesh Vasave	5,042	2.20%	New
NOTA	None of the above	2,664	1.16%	▼0.68
BSP	Sandip Devidas Bhil (Bagul)	2,586	1.13%	▲0.48
Independent	Gitanjali Shashikant Koli	1,632	0.71%	New
Margin of victory		145,944	63.59%	▲39.98
Turnout		232,164	66.10%	▼0.08
Total valid votes		229,500		
Registered electors		351,226		▲9.48
BJP hold		Swing	▲19.78	

=== Assembly Election 2019 ===
2019 Maharashtra Legislative Assembly election : Shirpur
Party	Candidate	Votes	%	±%
BJP	Kashiram Vechan Pawara	120,403	57.81%	▲20.21
Independent	Dr. Jitendra Yuvraj Thakur	71,229	34.20%	New
INC	Ranjitsingh Bharatsingh Pawara	7,754	3.72%	▼46.87
NOTA	None of the above	3,828	1.84%	▲0.64
VBA	Prof. Motilal Damu Sonawane	3,534	1.70%	New
CPI	Er. Vikas Kalidas Saindane	2,127	1.02%	▼1.84
Manav Ekta Party	Kishor Daulat Bhil	1,860	0.89%	New
BSP	Sukram Onkar Pawara	1,357	0.65%	▲0.07
Margin of victory		49,174	23.61%	▲10.62
Turnout		212,314	66.18%	▼0.22
Total valid votes		208,264		
Registered electors		320,802		▲8.48
BJP gain from INC		Swing	▲7.22	

=== Assembly Election 2014 ===
2014 Maharashtra Legislative Assembly election : Shirpur
Party	Candidate	Votes	%	±%
INC	Kashiram Vechan Pawara	98,114	50.59%	▼8.48
BJP	Dr. Jitendra Yuvraj Thakur	72,913	37.60%	▲4.07
NCP	Jayvant Pratap Padvi	11,409	5.88%	New
CPI	Gulabrao Gumansing Malche	5,547	2.86%	▲1.14
SS	Ranjitsinh Bharatsinh Pawara	3,942	2.03%	New
NOTA	None of the above	2,318	1.20%	New
Margin of victory		25,201	12.99%	▼12.55
Turnout		196,363	66.40%	▲8.38
Total valid votes		193,941		
Registered electors		295,736		▲10.06
INC hold		Swing	▼8.48	

=== Assembly Election 2009 ===
2009 Maharashtra Legislative Assembly election : Shirpur
Party	Candidate	Votes	%	±%
INC	Kashiram Vechan Pawara	92,088	59.07%	▼7.02
BJP	Ranjitsinh Bhartsinh Pawara	52,275	33.53%	▲5.53
Independent	Bhika Suka Bhil	2,935	1.88%	New
BSP	Advocate. I. K Pawara	2,683	1.72%	▼1.88
CPI	Ramchandra Thotu Pawara	2,675	1.72%	▼0.59
Margin of victory		39,813	25.54%	▼12.56
Turnout		155,893	58.02%	▼7.85
Total valid votes		155,892		
Registered electors		268,703		▲11.90
INC hold		Swing	▼7.02	

=== Assembly Election 2004 ===
2004 Maharashtra Legislative Assembly election : Shirpur
Party	Candidate	Votes	%	±%
INC	Amrishbhai Rasiklal Patel	104,535	66.09%	▲9.28
BJP	Baban Rawaji Chaudhari	44,279	28.00%	▲17.97
BSP	Pratap Uttamrao Sardar	5,700	3.60%	New
CPI	Adv. Madan Punamchand Pardeshi	3,646	2.31%	New
Margin of victory		60,256	38.10%	▲14.22
Turnout		158,178	65.87%	▼2.54
Total valid votes		158,160		
Registered electors		240,124		▲23.68
INC hold		Swing	▲9.28	

=== Assembly Election 1999 ===
1999 Maharashtra Legislative Assembly election : Shirpur
Party	Candidate	Votes	%	±%
INC	Amrishbhai Rasiklal Patel	71,053	56.81%	▼11.69
NCP	Shivajirao Girdhar Patil	41,182	32.93%	New
BJP	Dilip Jayram Lohar	12,547	10.03%	▲4.30
Margin of victory		29,871	23.88%	▼24.18
Turnout		132,819	68.41%	▼5.45
Total valid votes		125,062		
Registered electors		194,149		▲5.68
INC hold		Swing	▼11.69	

=== Assembly Election 1995 ===
1995 Maharashtra Legislative Assembly election : Shirpur
Party	Candidate	Votes	%	±%
INC	Amrishbhai Rasiklal Patel	90,005	68.50%	▲9.68
Independent	Narandrasing Darbarshing Jamadar	26,852	20.44%	New
BJP	Rameshrao Mukundrao Patil	7,527	5.73%	▼20.81
CPI	Adv. Madan Punamchand Pardeshi	3,648	2.78%	New
Independent	Darbarshing Dharma Girase	1,048	0.80%	New
Margin of victory		63,153	48.06%	▲15.78
Turnout		135,698	73.86%	▲6.67
Total valid votes		131,396		
Registered electors		183,720		▲17.36
INC hold		Swing	▲9.68	

=== Assembly Election 1990 ===
1990 Maharashtra Legislative Assembly election : Shirpur
Party	Candidate	Votes	%	±%
INC	Amrishbhai Rasiklal Patel	60,344	58.82%	▲20.93
BJP	Vishwasrao Patil	27,226	26.54%	New
Independent	Bhimrao Mhaske	7,118	6.94%	New
JD	Lahusing Shankarsing Jamadar	6,047	5.89%	New
Doordarshi Party	Chhaganbhai Shankarbhai Patel	622	0.61%	New
Margin of victory		33,118	32.28%	▲8.83
Turnout		105,187	67.19%	▲0.15
Total valid votes		102,593		
Registered electors		156,547		▲28.85
INC gain from JP		Swing	▼2.51	

=== Assembly Election 1985 ===
1985 Maharashtra Legislative Assembly election : Shirpur
Party	Candidate	Votes	%	±%
JP	Sambhaji Hiraman Patil	48,727	61.33%	New
INC	Indrasing Chandrasing Rajput	30,099	37.89%	New
Margin of victory		18,628	23.45%	▲4.34
Turnout		81,446	67.04%	▼4.96
Total valid votes		79,446		
Registered electors		121,492		▲12.61
JP gain from INC(I)		Swing	▲10.09	

=== Assembly Election 1980 ===
1980 Maharashtra Legislative Assembly election : Shirpur
Party	Candidate	Votes	%	±%
INC(I)	Indrasing Chandrasing Rajput	38,691	51.24%	▲46.12
INC(U)	Shivajirao Girdhar Patil	24,261	32.13%	New
BJP	Pralhadrao Madhavrao Patil	11,324	15.00%	New
Independent	Sahebrao Ralya Pawara	551	0.73%	New
Margin of victory		14,430	19.11%	▲3.00
Turnout		77,679	72.00%	▼4.21
Total valid votes		75,506		
Registered electors		107,884		▲11.09
INC(I) gain from JP		Swing	▼3.18	

=== Assembly Election 1978 ===
1978 Maharashtra Legislative Assembly election : Shirpur
Party	Candidate	Votes	%	±%
JP	Pralhadrao Madhavrao Patil	38,674	54.42%	New
INC	Vyankatrao Tajani Randhir	27,224	38.30%	▼27.47
INC(I)	Shankar Pandu Mali	3,640	5.12%	New
Independent	Rajaram Deochand Borasa	1,534	2.16%	New
Margin of victory		11,450	16.11%	▼19.50
Turnout		74,009	76.21%	▲6.78
Total valid votes		71,072		
Registered electors		97,117		▲13.38
JP gain from INC		Swing	▼11.35	

=== Assembly Election 1972 ===
1972 Maharashtra Legislative Assembly election : Shirpur
Party	Candidate	Votes	%	±%
INC	Shivajirao Girdhar Patil	37,616	65.77%	▲11.92
ABJS	Prahladrao Madhavrao Patil	17,251	30.16%	▼11.89
RPI	Shamrao Babaji Chavan	1,369	2.39%	▼1.70
Independent	Jagdeo Suklal Ragho	713	1.25%	New
Margin of victory		20,365	35.61%	▲23.81
Turnout		59,476	69.43%	▲0.99
Total valid votes		57,191		
Registered electors		85,659		▲10.01
INC hold		Swing	▲11.92	

=== Assembly Election 1967 ===
1967 Maharashtra Legislative Assembly election : Shirpur
Party	Candidate	Votes	%	±%
INC	Shivajirao Girdhar Patil	27,118	53.85%	▼7.62
ABJS	Prahladrao Madhavrao Patil	21,177	42.05%	New
RPI	P. L. Lalingkar	2,061	4.09%	New
Margin of victory		5,941	11.80%	▼22.56
Turnout		53,292	68.44%	▲9.34
Total valid votes		50,356		
Registered electors		77,866		▲6.16
INC hold		Swing	▼7.62	

=== Assembly Election 1962 ===
1962 Maharashtra Legislative Assembly election : Shirpur
Party	Candidate	Votes	%	±%
INC	Vyankatrao Tanaji Dhobi	24,753	61.47%	▲2.24
ABJS	Prahladrao Madhavrao Patil	10,916	27.11%	New
RPI	Vithal Ana Mahar	2,291	5.69%	New
Independent	Onkargir Kalugir Buwa	1,580	3.92%	New
Margin of victory		13,837	34.36%	▼2.63
Turnout		43,350	59.10%	▲2.71
Total valid votes		40,267		
Registered electors		73,350		▲48.31
INC hold		Swing	▲2.24	

=== Assembly Election 1952 ===
1952 Bombay State Legislative Assembly election : Shirpur
Party	Candidate	Votes	%	±%
INC	Gajmal Dalpat Mali	16,517	59.23%	New
PWPI	Uttamrao Girdhar Patil	6,202	22.24%	New
Socialist	Shivajirao Girdhar Patil	4,414	15.83%	New
Independent	Vanji Sajan Chaudhari	753	2.70%	New
Margin of victory		10,315	36.99%	
Turnout		27,886	56.39%	
Total valid votes		27,886		
Registered electors		49,456		
INC win (new seat)				

== See also ==
- Shirpur
- List of constituencies of Maharashtra Legislative Assembly
