= Laxman Vedu Valvi =

Indian politician (born 1923)

Member of Parliament, Lok Sabha
- In office 1957–1967
- Succeeded by: Tukaram Huraji Gavit
- Constituency: Nandurbar, Maharashtra

Personal details
- Born: 23 June 1923 Village Nalgavhan, Taloda Taluka, West Khandesh, Bombay Presidency, British India
- Party: Praja Socialist Party
- Spouse: Tarabai

Laxman Vedu Valvi (born 23 June 1923) is an Indian politician. He was elected to the Lok Sabha, the lower house of the Parliament of India as a member of the Praja Socialist Party.
