= Heena Gavit =

Indian politician

Dr. Heena Gavit

Member of Parliament, Lok Sabha
- In office 16 May 2014 – 4 June 2024
- Preceded by: Manikrao Hodlya Gavit
- Succeeded by: Gowaal Kagada Padavi
- Constituency: Nandurbar

Personal details
- Born: 28 June 1987 (age 39) Nandurbar
- Party: Bharatiya Janata Party (2014-2024), (Oct 2025 - Present)
- Other political affiliations: Independent (Nov 2024 - Oct 2025)
- Relations: Vijaykumar Krishnarao Gavit (father)
- Education: M.B.B.S; M.D. General Medicine; L.L.B
- Profession: Doctor, Politician
- As of 28 February, 2015

Heena Vijaykumar Gavit (born 28 June 1987) is an Indian Bharatiya Janata Party politician from Maharashtra. She was a member of the Lok Sabha from 2014 to 2024, representing the Nandurbar constituency. She is a National Spokesperson of the BJP.

== Professional career ==
Heena Gavit is the daughter of Vijaykumar Gavit, a Bharatiya Janata Party & Ex-Nationalist Congress Party (NCP) MLA from the Nandurbar Assembly constituency. She is a doctor by profession.

== Political career ==
In the 2014 Lok Sabha elections, she defeated Manikrao Hodlya Gavit, a nine-time MP from Nandurbar. Manikrao's Indian National Congress held the seat since 1981. Heena's victory of margin was 106905 votes.

Along with Raksha Khadse, she became the youngest MP in the 16th Lok Sabha.

In the 2024 Indian General Elections, She was defeated by Adv. Gowaal Padvi of Indian National Congress by 1,59,120 votes. Later she left the Bhartiya Janata Party (BJP) in October 2024 to contest Assembly Election against K.C Padvi (Father of Gowaal Padvi), but lost the election. She again rejoin BJP in n November 2025

== Controversy ==
On 5 August 2018, the protesters who were observing a dharna outside the Dhule Collector's office for the past 16 days attacked Heena Gavit's car.
