= Shirishkumar Mehta =

Indian activist (1926–1942)

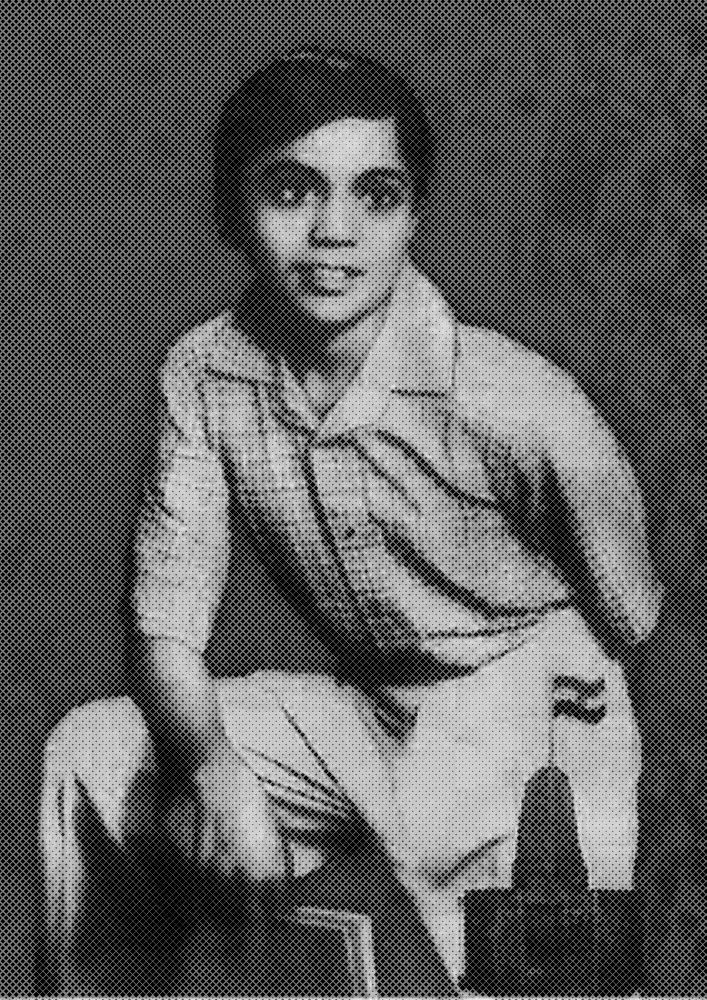
- Born: 28 December 1926; Nandurbar, Maharashtra, India
- Died: 9 September 1942 (aged 15); Nandurbar, Maharashtra, India
- Known for: Indian independence movement

Shirishkumar Mehta, 28 December 1926 – 9 September 1942) was an Indian freedom fighter, a Revolutionary movement for Indian independence.

Mahatma Gandhi started the Quit India movement against the British in 1942. Shirishkumar was leading a procession protesting against the government in Nandurbar. The police had set up barricades at Mangal Bazar area. The police launched a Lathi charge on the protesters as soon as procession reached them. Shirishkumar had the Tiranga, the Indian national flag and the slogan was 'Vande Mataram'. The police opened fire when their lathi charge could not stop the procession. Shirishkumar was killed on the spot. With him, Dhansukhlal Wani, Ghanshyam Das, Shashidhar Ketkar, and Laldas also died.
