= Manjare =

Village in Maharashtra

- Village
- Interactive map of Manjare
- Coordinates: 21°23′53″N 74°26′53″E
- Country: India
- State: Maharashtra

Manjare is a village in the state of Maharashtra, India. It is located in the Nandubar taluka of Nandurbar District. This village is famous for maa Kalika Mata Festival on Shriram Navami.The climate in the village is hot and dry. This region is considered a tropical region. The climate in the village varies according to the seasons, with very cold (5 'C) winters in winter and 49'C in summer, with very little rainfall during the monsoons. The population of the village is approximately 2200-2500. 80% of the people are literate in terms of education. The village has education facilities only up to 4th standard. The main occupation of the villagers is agriculture. Cotton is the main crop grown here. Sorghum, millet, maize, chilli, tur, mug, urad, matki and other crops are grown, while some cultivators cultivate papaya, sugarcane and banana.

this village is famous pentacle for ganeshotsav and hari bhakt parayan related kirtan saptah or shrimadbhagvat gita kathasar or shree ram katha sar. The community living in this village was only Hindu- Kunbi Patil, Nhavi, Rajput, Koli, Bhill, Wadar, Mahar, etc.All the festivals held in the village according to Hindu tradition are performed in a mythological manner. Such as Gavichi Yatra, Ganpati Utsav, Navratri Utsav, Bhaldev, Pola Diwali, Dussehra, Kanbai Mata Utsav, etc.Due to the bad weather in the village, the youth of the village are working elsewhere.
