= Tukaram Huraji Gavit =

Indian politician (1923–1977)

Member of Parliament, Lok Sabha
- In office 1967-1977
- Preceded by: Laxman Vedu Valvi
- Succeeded by: Surupsing Hirya Naik
- Constituency: Nandurbar, Maharashtra

Personal details
- Born: 14 February 1923 Natavad, Taluka Nandurbar, Dhulia, Bombay Presidency, British India
- Died: 1977 (aged 54) New Delhi, India
- Party: Indian National Congress
- Spouse: Late. Smt. Nalini Tukaram Gavit
- Children: Late. Shri. Pradeep Tukaram Gavit

Tukaram Huraji Gavit (14 February 1923 – 1977) was an Indian politician. He was elected to the Lok Sabha, the lower house of the Parliament of India as a member of the Indian National Congress. Gavit died in New Delhi in 1977, at the age of 54.
