= Dhanaji Sitaram Ahire =

Indian politician

Dhanaji Sitaram Ahire (D. S. Ahire) (born 4 May 1953) is a member of the 13th Maharashtra Legislative Assembly. He represents the Sakri Assembly Constituency. He belongs to the Indian National Congress. D. S. Ahire had represented Sakri earlier in 2004. D. S. Ahire was also member of the 12th Lok Sabha, representing the Dhule (ST) constituency. He was Dy. Collector in revenue Department in Maharashtra Govt. He is from Kudashi Tal.Sakri.Dist. Dhule. His wife is Sarpanch of that Kudashi village (2018). He has 1 daughter and 1 son. Both are engineers.
