= Nandu, Nigeria =

Nandu Numbu
- Village
- Location within Nigeria
- Coordinates: 09°13′59″N 08°31′0″E
- Country: Nigeria
- State: Kaduna State
- LGA: Sanga
- Time zone: UTC+01:00 (WAT)
- Postal code: 802141
- Climate: Aw

Nandu (Hausa: Numbu) is a village community in Sanga, a Local Government Area in southern Kaduna State in the Middle Belt region of Nigeria.

The postal code for the village is 801121.

The area has an altitude of about 1,889 feet (575m) .

== Hamlets ==
Nandu is a village in Sanga, Local Government Area which is populated with other nearby area ; Gwantu, Fadan Karshi.
