= Kagda Chandya Padvi =

Indian politician

Adv. Kagda Chandya Padvi

Ex-Cabinet Minister Government of Maharashtra
- In office 30 December 2019 – 29 June 2022
- Minister: Tribal Development
- Governor: Bhagat Singh Koshyari
- Chief Minister: Uddhav Thackeray
- Deputy CM: Ajit Pawar
- Preceded by: Prof.(Dr) Ashok Uike
- Succeeded by: Dr.Vijaykumar Gavit

Member of Legislative Assembly Maharashtra
- In office (1990-1995),(1995-1999),(1999-2004),(2004-2009),(2009-2014),(2014-2019),(2019 – 2024)
- Preceded by: Pawara Rameshbhai Thikya
- Succeeded by: Aamshya Padavi
- Constituency: Akkalkuwa-Akrani

Personal details
- Born: 30 March 1958 (age 68) Akkalkuwa, Nandurbar district
- Party: Indian National Congress
- Children: Gowaal Padavi

Adv. Kagda Chandya Padvi is a former member of the Maharashtra Legislative Assembly from 1990 till 2024. He was Minister of Tribal Affairs in Maharashtra Government. He represented the Akkalkuwa (ST) Assembly Constituency. He belongs to the Indian National Congress. In 2004 he represented the 84 - Akrani (ST) Assembly Constituency.
