= Manikrao Hodlya Gavit =

Indian politician (1934–2022)

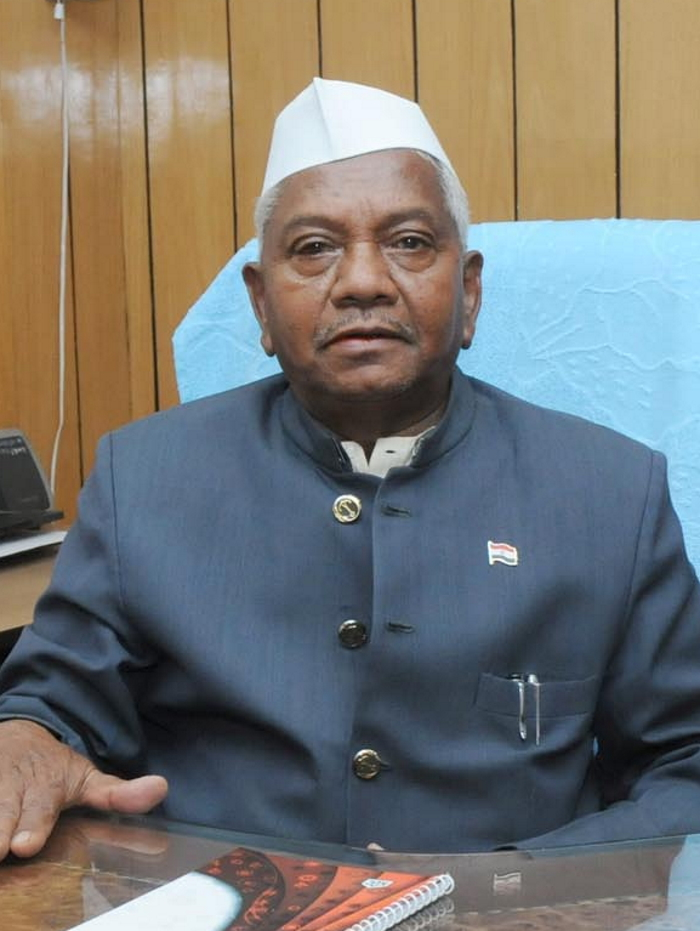
- Gavit in 2013

Union Minister of State, Home Affairs
- In office 23 May 2004 – 6 April 2007
- President: Pratibha Patil
- Prime Minister: Manmohan Singh
- Preceded by: Chinmayanand Swami
- Succeeded by: Shriprakash Jaiswal

Pro-tem Speaker of 15th Lok Sabha
- In office 31 May 2009 – 4 June 2009
- President: Pratibha Patil
- Prime Minister: Manmohan Singh
- Preceded by: Anant Geete
- Succeeded by: Kamal Nath

Minister of State for Social Justice & Empowerment
- In office 22 July 2013 – 26 May 2014
- President: Pratibha Patil
- Prime Minister: Manmohan Singh
- Preceded by: Porika Balram Naik
- Succeeded by: Sudarshan Bhagat

Personal details
- Born: 29 October 1934 Dhudipada, Bombay Presidency, British India
- Died: 17 September 2022 (aged 87) Nashik, Maharashtra, India
- Party: Indian National Congress

Manikrao Hodlya Gavit (Marathi: माणिकराव होडल्या गावित; 29 October 1934 – 17 September 2022) was an Indian politician from Nandurbar district of Maharashtra, India. A member of the Indian National Congress (INC), he represented the Nandurbar constituency from 1980 to 2014, winning the Indian general elections consecutive nine times, marking a record.

Gavit served as a member of the 7th, 8th, 9th, 10th, 11th, 12th, 13th and 14th Lok Sabha. In his 14th parliamentary term, he was Minister of State in the Ministry of Home Affairs in the Manmohan Singh government until 6 April 2008, when he was asked to resign. He alleged that Indian National Congress President Sonia Gandhi told him that she was under pressure to remove him. He was elected for the consecutive ninth time from the Nandurbar constituency in the 2009 Indian general election.

Gavit had been appointed a pro-tem speaker of 15th Lok Sabha by President Pratibha Patil. As pro-tem speaker, he performed the Speaker's duties until the election of a new Speaker of the Lok Sabha. He served as Minister of State for the Social Justice department.

In the 2014 general elections, Manikrao Gavit lost the Nandurbar seat to Heena Gavit by a margin of 106,905 votes.
