= Nandu =

Nandu may refer to:

== Places ==
- Chengdu, a city in Sichuan, China, known as 南都 (Southern Capital or Nandu) during the early Tang dynasty
- Jiangling County, a city in Hubei, China, formerly known as 南都 (Southern Capital or Nandu) during the later Tang dynasty
- Nandu River, Hainan province, China
- Nandu, Nigeria, a village in southern Kaduna state

== Other uses ==
- Ñandú, a native South American name for any of three species of Rhea.
- Nandu (film), a 1981 Tamil film
- Ñandú (vehicle), a 1940s all-terrain military vehicle
- Southern Metropolis Daily, often shortened to Nandu (南都)
- One of the Argentine Air Force flights that attacked the British fleet in the Battle of San Carlos, during the Falklands War, 1982

== People with the given name ==
- Nandu Bhende (c. 1955–2014), Indian singer
- Nandu M. Natekar (1933–2021), Indian badminton player
- Nandu (Malayalam actor) (born 1965), Indian film actor
- Nandu (Telugu actor), Indian film actor
