= Gowaal Kagada Padavi =

Indian politician

Member of Parliament, Lok Sabha
- Incumbent
- Assumed office June 2024
- Preceded by: Heena Gavit
- Constituency: Nandurbar

Personal details
- Born: August 22, 1992 (age 34) Mumbai, Maharashtra
- Party: Indian National Congress
- Parent: Kagda Chandya Padvi (father)
- Education: University of Mumbai (LLM)
- Occupation: Advocate

Gowaal Kagada Padavi is an Indian politician. He is a member of Indian National Congress.

== Political career ==
Padavi was elected in 2024 as a Member of Parliament from Nandurbar Lok Sabha Constituency. He defeated Heena Gavit of Bharatiya Janta Party by a margin over 1,59,120 votes.
