= Nandurbar Assembly constituency =

Constituency of the Maharashtra legislative assembly in India

Coordinates: 21°22′09.38″N 74°12′22.07″E

Nandurbar
- Constituency No. 3 for the Maharashtra Legislative Assembly

Constituency details
- Country: India
- Region: Western India
- State: Maharashtra
- District: Nandurbar
- Lok Sabha constituency: Nandurbar
- Established: 1962
- Total electors: 353,953
- Reservation: ST

Member of Legislative Assembly
- 15th Maharashtra Legislative Assembly
- Incumbent Vijaykumar Gavit
- Party: BJP
- Alliance: NDA
- Elected year: 2024

Nandurbar Assembly constituency is one of the 288 Vidhan Sabha constituencies of Maharashtra state in western India. This constituency is located in Nandurbar district and it is reserved for the candidates belonging to the Scheduled Tribes. It is currently held by Vijaykumar Gavit of the BJP.

== Overview ==
It is part of the Nandurbar Lok Sabha constituency along with another five Vidhan Sabha segments, namely Akkalkuwa, Shahada and Navapur in Nandurbar district and Sakri and Shirpur in Dhule district.

== Members of the Legislative Assembly ==
Year	Member	Party
1962	Tulshiram Patil	Indian National Congress
1967	Ramesh Valvi	Indian National Congress
1972	Ramesh Valvi	Indian National Congress
1978	Ramesh Valvi	Indian National Congress
1980	Ramesh Valvi	Indian National Congress (I)
1985	Indrasing Vasave	Indian National Congress
1990	Pratap Valvi	Indian National Congress
1995	Vijaykumar Gavit	Independent
1999	Vijaykumar Gavit	Nationalist Congress Party
2004	Vijaykumar Gavit	Nationalist Congress Party
2009	Vijaykumar Gavit	Nationalist Congress Party
2014	Vijaykumar Gavit	Bharatiya Janata Party
2019	Vijaykumar Gavit	Bharatiya Janata Party
2024	Vijaykumar Gavit	Bharatiya Janata Party

== Election results ==
=== Assembly Election 2024 ===
2024 Maharashtra Legislative Assembly election : Nandurbar
Party	Candidate	Votes	%	±%
BJP	Dr.Vijaykumar Krishnarao Gavit	155,190	65.06	▼0.68
INC	Engg. Kiran Damodar Tadavi	78,943	33.09	▲5.41
NOTA	None of the Above	1,634	0.69	▼1.22
Margin of victory		76,247	31.96	▼6.09
Turnout		240,169	67.85	▲12.84
Total valid votes		238,535		
Registered electors		353,953		▲4.38
BJP hold		Swing	▼0.68	

=== Assembly Election 2019 ===
2019 Maharashtra Legislative Assembly election : Nandurbar
Party	Candidate	Votes	%	±%
BJP	Dr.Vijaykumar Krishnarao Gavit	121,605	65.74	▲12.63
INC	Udesingh Kocharu Padvi	51,209	27.69	▼11.21
VBA	Dipa Shamshon Valvi	6,734	3.64	New
NOTA	None of the Above	3,521	1.90	▲0.41
Independent	Ananda Sukalal Koli	2,047	1.11	New
BSP	Vipul Ramsing Vasave	1,925	1.04	New
SWP	Adv.Prakash Mohan Gangurde	1,448	0.78	New
Margin of victory		70,396	38.06	▲23.84
Turnout		188,496	55.59	▼6.61
Total valid votes		184,968		
Registered electors		339,098		▲8.71
BJP hold		Swing	▲12.63	

=== Assembly Election 2014 ===
2014 Maharashtra Legislative Assembly election : Nandurbar
Party	Candidate	Votes	%	±%
BJP	Dr.Vijaykumar Krishnarao Gavit	101,328	53.11	▲11.41
INC	Vasave Kunal Batesing	74,210	38.90	New
SS	Virendra Ravji Valvi	8,598	4.51	New
NOTA	None of the Above	2,857	1.50	New
MNS	Gulabsing Divansing Vasave	1,955	1.02	New
NCP	Valvi Vikas Dulji	1,784	0.94	▼53.95
Independent	Bhil Birbal Sakharam	1,229	0.64	New
Margin of victory		27,118	14.21	▲1.03
Turnout		193,717	62.10	▼6.55
Total valid votes		190,776		
Registered electors		311,939		▲16.71
BJP gain from NCP		Swing	▼1.77	

=== Assembly Election 2009 ===
2009 Maharashtra Legislative Assembly election : Nandurbar
Party	Candidate	Votes	%	±%
NCP	Dr.Vijaykumar Krishnarao Gavit	99,323	54.88	▲2.84
BJP	Natawadkar Suhasini Suhas	75,465	41.70	New
Independent	Gavit Sharad Dilip	2,957	1.63	New
RPI(A)	Sonawane Arjun Ratan	1,284	0.71	New
BSP	Valvi Ashok Jumma	1,222	0.68	New
Margin of victory		23,858	13.18	▼14.66
Turnout		181,020	67.73	▲0.80
Total valid votes		180,976		
Registered electors		267,280		▲29.02
NCP hold		Swing	▲2.84	

=== Assembly Election 2004 ===
2004 Maharashtra Legislative Assembly election : Nandurbar
Party	Candidate	Votes	%	±%
NCP	Dr.Vijaykumar Krishnarao Gavit	72,132	52.04	▲1.42
SS	Gaikwad Namdevrao Ghamaji	33,534	24.19	▲22.86
Independent	Vasave Gulabsing Diwansing	28,817	20.79	New
Independent	Thakur Kailas Manga	4,131	2.98	New
Margin of victory		38,598	27.85	▲23.99
Turnout		138,625	66.92	▲1.71
Total valid votes		138,614		
Registered electors		207,162		▲10.82
NCP hold		Swing	▲1.42	

=== Assembly Election 1999 ===
1999 Maharashtra Legislative Assembly election : Nandurbar
Party	Candidate	Votes	%	±%
NCP	Dr.Vijaykumar Krishnarao Gavit	61,707	50.62	New
INC	Vasave Indrasing Diwansing	57,013	46.77	▲15.26
SS	Padvi Ajabsing Gangaji	1,625	1.33	▼13.22
Independent	Gangurde Vasudeo Namdeo	1,552	1.27	New
Margin of victory		4,694	3.85	▼12.34
Turnout		128,837	68.92	▼2.70
Total valid votes		121,897		
Registered electors		186,944		▲4.96
NCP gain from Independent		Swing	▲2.92	

=== Assembly Election 1995 ===
1995 Maharashtra Legislative Assembly election : Nandurbar
Party	Candidate	Votes	%	±%
Independent	Dr.Vijaykumar Krishnarao Gavit	57,694	47.70	New
INC	Valvi Pratap Rubji	38,116	31.51	▼17.64
SS	Valvi Rajendrasing Vikramsing	17,598	14.55	▲6.85
Independent	Thakare Raysing Chiptya	6,469	5.35	New
Doordarshi Party	Vasave Jabarshing Mirya	1,078	0.89	▲0.22
Margin of victory		19,578	16.19	▲9.23
Turnout		125,573	70.50	▲13.64
Total valid votes		120,955		
Registered electors		178,113		▲9.62
Independent gain from INC		Swing	▼1.45	

=== Assembly Election 1990 ===
1990 Maharashtra Legislative Assembly election : Nandurbar
Party	Candidate	Votes	%	±%
INC	Valvi Pratap Kubaji	43,342	49.15	▼23.94
JD	Gavit Krushnarao Damaji	37,206	42.19	New
SS	Vilas Rawa Kokani	6,790	7.70	New
Doordarshi Party	Vasave Nurji Mudya	589	0.67	New
Margin of victory		6,136	6.96	▼42.32
Turnout		90,581	55.75	▲10.11
Total valid votes		88,178		
Registered electors		162,486		▲23.56
INC hold		Swing	▼23.94	

=== Assembly Election 1985 ===
1985 Maharashtra Legislative Assembly election : Nandurbar
Party	Candidate	Votes	%	±%
INC	Indrasing Diwansing Vasave	42,444	73.09	New
JP	Valvi Pravin Jalamsing	13,829	23.81	New
Independent	Tejaram Baliram Kokani	1,145	1.97	New
Independent	Kokani Baraku Jiwalya	651	1.12	New
Margin of victory		28,615	49.28	▲11.55
Turnout		59,587	45.31	▼0.95
Total valid votes		58,069		
Registered electors		131,505		▲9.81
INC gain from INC(I)		Swing	▲4.23	

=== Assembly Election 1980 ===
1980 Maharashtra Legislative Assembly election : Nandurbar
Party	Candidate	Votes	%	±%
INC(I)	Ramesh Panya Valvi	37,198	68.86	New
INC(U)	Gavit Nalinibai Tukaram	16,818	31.14	New
Margin of victory		20,380	37.73	▲20.61
Turnout		55,678	46.49	▼19.71
Total valid votes		54,016		
Registered electors		119,760		▲6.89
INC(I) gain from INC		Swing	▲10.31	

=== Assembly Election 1978 ===
1978 Maharashtra Legislative Assembly election : Nandurbar
Party	Candidate	Votes	%	±%
INC	Ramesh Panya Valvi	42,526	58.56	▼21.22
JP	Natawadkar Jayant Ganpat	30,095	41.44	New
Margin of victory		12,431	17.12	▼45.75
Turnout		75,163	67.09	▲19.71
Total valid votes		72,621		
Registered electors		112,039		▲19.62
INC hold		Swing	▼21.22	

=== Assembly Election 1972 ===
1972 Maharashtra Legislative Assembly election : Nandurbar
Party	Candidate	Votes	%	±%
INC	Ramesh Panya Valvi	33,705	79.78	▲23.21
ABJS	Madhav Bandu More	7,145	16.91	▼26.52
Independent	Zamtru Nathu Valvi	1,398	3.31	New
Margin of victory		26,560	62.87	▲49.74
Turnout		43,935	46.91	▼9.23
Total valid votes		42,248		
Registered electors		93,664		▲9.37
INC hold		Swing	▲23.21	

=== Assembly Election 1967 ===
1967 Maharashtra Legislative Assembly election : Nandurbar
Party	Candidate	Votes	%	±%
INC	Ramesh Panya Valvi	26,321	56.57	▲1.01
ABJS	Z. N. Valvi	20,211	43.43	▲25.15
Margin of victory		6,110	13.13	▼17.37
Turnout		49,423	57.71	▼1.96
Total valid votes		46,532		
Registered electors		85,638		▲13.03
INC hold		Swing	▲1.01	

=== Assembly Election 1962 ===
1962 Maharashtra Legislative Assembly election : Nandurbar
Party	Candidate	Votes	%	±%
INC	Gajmal Tulshiram Patil	23,697	55.56	New
Independent	Shankarrao Chinduji Bedse	10,688	25.06	New
ABJS	Pursaram Mohanlal Maheshwari	7,799	18.28	New
Independent	Popatlal Nathubhai Vani	470	1.10	New
Margin of victory		13,009	30.50	
Turnout		46,280	61.08	
Total valid votes		42,654		
Registered electors		75,764		
INC win (new seat)				

== See also ==
- Nandu (disambiguation)
- List of constituencies of the Maharashtra Legislative Assembly
