= Nandurbar =

- City
- Nandurbar in Maharashtra
- Coordinates: 21.37°N 74.25°E
- Country: India
- State: Maharashtra
- District: Nandurbar
- Established: 1 July 1998
- Named for: Nanda Raja

Government
  - Type: Municipal Council

Area
  - Total: 11.45 km^{2} (4.42 sq mi)
- Elevation: 210 m (690 ft)

Population (2011)
  - Total: 111,000
  - Density: 9,690/km^{2} (25,100/sq mi)
- Demonym: Nandurbarkar

Language
  - Official: Marathi
  - Spoken: Marathi, Bhili, Gujarati and various dialects of Khandeshi
- Time zone: UTC+5:30 (IST)
- PIN: 425 412
- Vehicle registration: MH-39
- Telephone Code: +91(2564)
- Website: www.nandurbar.nic.in

Nandurbar is a city and a municipal council in Nandurbar district in the Indian state of Maharashtra. Nandurbar Municipal Council is The First Municipal Council. The District Nandurbar was formed from the district Dhule on July 1, 1998. Nandurbar is an administrative district in the northwest corner of (Khandesh region) of Maharashtra. On 1 July 1998 Dhule was bifurcated as two separate districts now known as Dhule and Nandurbar. The district headquarters is located in Nandurbar city. The district occupies an area of 5034 km^{2} and has a population of 1,311,709 of which 15.45% is urban (as of 2001). Nandurbar district is bounded to the south and south-east by Dhule district, to the west and north is the state of Gujarat, to the north and north-east is the state of Madhya Pradesh. The northern boundary of the district is defined by the great Narmada river. It came into the limelight during February 2006 bird flu crisis which struck many of its poultry farms. Thousands of chickens from the farms had to be killed and buried in nearby grounds to stop the virus spreading.

== History ==
Nandurbar district's region was part of Khandesh district until 1906, when the British government bifurcated it to form two districts West Khandesh and East Khandesh, Dhule and Jalgaon became their headquarters respectively. In October 1960, East Khandesh was renamed to Jalgaon district. Somewhere in second half of 20th century, Dhule district bifurcated to form Nandurbar district with Nandurbar town as its headquarter. The district's region was part of Bombay state from 1956 to 1960.

During British rule, in 1942 the town's English police fired at the school children who were marching with an Indian flag, in the incident a student Shirishkumar died due to a gun shot wound. As per Balbharti's school text book chapter of class 3rd or 4th, during the event day, police stopped their march and pointed guns at school girls, Shirish Kumar came forward and challenged British police to dare to shoot at him.

== Geography ==
Nandurbar is located at 21.37°N 74.25°E. It has an average elevation of 210 metres (688 feet). It has mainly a hilly region and has 'Toranmal' hill station which is 75 km from the Nandurbar district. It is the second hill station after Matheran in Maharashtra. Tapi river is located at 12 km from city. Narmada river forms the district's boundary on the northern and north-eastern side. It is well known tribal area, hence called tribal district.

== Transport ==
Nandurbar is served by a station on the Indian Railways network. Also State transport buses are available. Nandurbar is connected to Madhya Pradesh and Gujarat by Indian state highways.

== Demographics ==
As of 2011 India census, Nandurbar had a population of 111,037. Nandurbar has an average literacy rate of 72%, higher than the national average of 59.5%: male literacy is 78%, and female literacy is 65%. In Nandurbar, 12% of the population is under 6 years of age.

== Tourist attractions ==
- Toranmal is nearby hill station.
- Unapdev is (56.7 km) from Nandurbar and is a picnic point in Nandurbar.

== Villages ==
- Manjare

== See also ==
- Nandurbar Railway Station
- Nandurbar Loksabha Constituency
- Nandurbar Vidhan Sabha Constituency
