= Yashvantrao Sakharam Desale =

Indian politician and freedom fighter

Yashvantrao Sakharam Desale was a freedom fighter and member of the Maharashtra Legislative Assembly for Sakri Taluka. He received an award from Indira Gandhi for his work against the British government. He was the chief promoter of Panjhra Kan Co-operative Sugar mill of Sakri.
