= Navapur Assembly constituency =

Constituency of the Maharashtra legislative assembly in India

Coordinates: 21.16°N 73.80°E

Navapur
- Constituency No. 4 for the Maharashtra Legislative Assembly

Constituency details
- Country: India
- Region: Western India
- State: Maharashtra
- District: Nandurbar
- Lok Sabha constituency: Nandurbar
- Established: 1955
- Total electors: 295,851
- Reservation: ST

Member of Legislative Assembly
- 15th Maharashtra Legislative Assembly
- Incumbent Shirishkumar Surupsing Naik
- Party: INC
- Alliance: MVA
- Elected year: 2024

Navapur Assembly constituency (formerly, Nawapur) is one of the 288 Vidhan Sabha constituencies of Maharashtra state in western India. This constituency is located in Nandurbar district and it is reserved for the candidates belonging to the Scheduled Tribes.

== Overview ==
It is part of the Nandurbar Lok Sabha constituency along with another five Vidhan Sabha segments, namely Shahada, Nandurbar and Akkalkuwa in Nandurbar district and Sakri and Shirpur in Dhule district.

== Members of the Legislative Assembly ==
Year	Member	Party
From 1952 - 1957 see: Nawapur Sakri
1957	Abraham Chaudhary	Independent
1962	Dharma Jayaram Kokani	Indian National Congress
1967	Dharma Jayaram Kokani	Indian National Congress
1972	Surupsingh Hirya Naik	Indian National Congress
1978	Zina Samya Vasave	Indian National Congress (I)
1980	Manikrao Hodlya Gavit	Indian National Congress (I)
1985	Surupsingh Hirya Naik	Indian National Congress
1990	Surupsingh Hirya Naik	Indian National Congress
1995	Surupsingh Hirya Naik	Indian National Congress
1999	Surupsingh Hirya Naik	Indian National Congress
2004	Surupsingh Hirya Naik	Indian National Congress
2009	Sharad Gavit	Samajwadi Party
2014	Surupsingh Hirya Naik	Indian National Congress
2019	Shirishkumar Surupsing Naik	Indian National Congress
2024	Shirishkumar Surupsing Naik	Indian National Congress

== Election results ==
=== Assembly Election 2024 ===
2024 Maharashtra Legislative Assembly election : Navapur
Party	Candidate	Votes	%	±%
INC	Shirishkumar Surupsing Naik	87,166	36.55%	▲1.46
Independent	Sharad Krushnarao Gavit	86,045	36.08%	New
NCP	Bharat Manikrao Gavit	56,176	23.56%	New
PWPI	Ranjit Vantya Gavit	2,858	1.20%	New
NOTA	None of the Above	2,717	1.14%	▼1.19
Margin of victory		1,121	0.47%	▼4.86
Turnout		2,41,193	81.53%	▲6.74
Total valid votes		2,38,476		
Registered electors		2,95,851		▲2.73
INC hold		Swing	▲1.46	

=== Assembly Election 2019 ===
2019 Maharashtra Legislative Assembly election : Navapur
Party	Candidate	Votes	%	±%
INC	Shirishkumar Surupsing Naik	74,652	35.10%	▼13.32
Independent	Sharad Krushnarao Gavit	63,317	29.77%	New
BJP	Gavit Bharat Manikrao	58,579	27.54%	▲21.74
Bhartiya Tribal Party	Dr. Ulhas Jayant Vasave	6,009	2.82%	New
VBA	Jagan Hurji Gavit	5,462	2.57%	New
NOTA	None of the Above	4,950	2.33%	▲0.22
Independent	Dr. Rakesh Rajya Gavit	1,286	0.60%	New
Margin of victory		11,335	5.33%	▼5.93
Turnout		2,17,768	75.62%	▲1.04
Total valid votes		2,12,713		
Registered electors		2,87,977		▲8.25
INC hold		Swing	▼13.32	

=== Assembly Election 2014 ===
2014 Maharashtra Legislative Assembly election : Navapur
Party	Candidate	Votes	%	±%
INC	Surupsingh Hirya Naik	93,796	48.41%	▲6.43
NCP	Gavit Sharad Krushnarao	71,979	37.15%	New
BJP	Valvi Kuvarsing Fulaji	11,236	5.80%	▲2.30
PWPI	Gavit Jagan Huraji	4,096	2.11%	New
NOTA	None of the Above	4,088	2.11%	New
SS	Jyotsna Dilip Gavit	3,977	2.05%	New
Independent	Motilal Chapdu Gangurde	2,009	1.04%	New
BSP	Vasave Amit Sheklal	1,746	0.90%	▼0.01
Margin of victory		21,817	11.26%	▲10.30
Turnout		1,97,890	74.39%	▼3.24
Total valid votes		1,93,738		
Registered electors		2,66,023		▲14.76
INC gain from SP		Swing	▲5.47	

=== Assembly Election 2009 ===
2009 Maharashtra Legislative Assembly election : Navapur
Party	Candidate	Votes	%	±%
SP	Gavit Sharad Krushnarao	75,719	42.94%	▲42.06
INC	Surupsingh Hirya Naik	74,024	41.98%	▼31.57
Independent	Naik Dilip Shashikumar	11,853	6.72%	New
BJP	Anil Mohan Vasave	6,166	3.50%	▼10.52
BBM	Vasave Arjunsing Divansing	3,670	2.08%	New
Independent	Gavit Sharad Fattesing	1,892	1.07%	New
BSP	Gavit Ishwar Nurji	1,610	0.91%	▼4.55
Margin of victory		1,695	0.96%	▼58.57
Turnout		1,76,325	76.06%	▲0.33
Total valid votes		1,76,324		
Registered electors		2,31,811		▲6.18
SP gain from INC		Swing	▼30.61	

=== Assembly Election 2004 ===
2004 Maharashtra Legislative Assembly election : Navapur
Party	Candidate	Votes	%	±%
INC	Surupsingh Hirya Naik	121,613	73.55%	▲20.74
BJP	Bagul Anil Sukram	23,179	14.02%	▲0.29
BSP	Gavit Ishwar Nuraji	9,034	5.46%	New
Independent	Gangurde Savita Ramakant	5,464	3.30%	New
Independent	Gawali Durgabai Hiru	1,992	1.20%	New
SP	Gavit Sobaji Deolya	1,467	0.89%	New
Margin of victory		98,434	59.53%	▲40.19
Turnout		1,65,454	75.79%	▲11.13
Total valid votes		1,65,339		
Registered electors		2,18,313		▲11.32
INC hold		Swing	▲20.74	

=== Assembly Election 1999 ===
1999 Maharashtra Legislative Assembly election : Navapur
Party	Candidate	Votes	%	±%
INC	Surupsingh Hirya Naik	66,902	52.81%	▼0.55
NCP	Dilip Shashikumar Naik	42,397	33.47%	New
BJP	Mavachi Ratanji Motya	17,387	13.72%	▼22.89
Margin of victory		24,505	19.34%	▲2.61
Turnout		1,33,948	68.30%	▼4.19
Total valid votes		1,26,686		
Registered electors		1,96,105		▲3.53
INC hold		Swing	▼0.55	

=== Assembly Election 1995 ===
1995 Maharashtra Legislative Assembly election : Navapur
Party	Candidate	Votes	%	±%
INC	Surupsingh Hirya Naik	69,518	53.36%	▼14.05
BJP	Mavachi Ratanji Motya	47,711	36.62%	▲19.66
Independent	Pawar Babulal Kisan	11,395	8.75%	New
Doordarshi Party	Vasave Mira Kishor	1,669	1.28%	▲0.83
Margin of victory		21,807	16.74%	▼33.72
Turnout		1,37,605	72.65%	▲8.75
Total valid votes		1,30,293		
Registered electors		1,89,414		▲15.25
INC hold		Swing	▼14.05	

=== Assembly Election 1990 ===
1990 Maharashtra Legislative Assembly election : Navapur
Party	Candidate	Votes	%	±%
INC	Surupsingh Hirya Naik	66,510	67.41%	▼7.52
BJP	Thakare Ambar Barik	16,728	16.95%	New
JD	Gavit Sobaji Devalya	14,311	14.50%	New
Margin of victory		49,782	50.45%	▼8.23
Turnout		1,01,233	61.60%	▼3.56
Total valid votes		98,671		
Registered electors		1,64,348		▲25.13
INC hold		Swing	▼7.52	

=== Assembly Election 1985 ===
1985 Maharashtra Legislative Assembly election : Navapur
Party	Candidate	Votes	%	±%
INC	Surupsingh Hirya Naik	62,580	74.93%	New
JP	Vasant Dodha Suryavanshi	13,565	16.24%	▲11.75
Independent	Gavit Nojubhai Fulsing	4,320	5.17%	New
Independent	Swarupsing Fulji Valavi	1,213	1.45%	New
Independent	Manji Fojya Vasave	1,110	1.33%	New
Independent	Ranu Ukhadya Kokani	735	0.88%	New
Margin of victory		49,015	58.68%	▼12.07
Turnout		85,727	65.27%	▲16.55
Total valid votes		83,523		
Registered electors		1,31,337		▲13.25
INC gain from INC(I)		Swing	▼8.20	

=== Assembly Election 1980 ===
1980 Maharashtra Legislative Assembly election : Navapur
Party	Candidate	Votes	%	±%
INC(I)	Manikrao Hodlya Gavit	45,357	83.13%	▲41.17
BJP	Kokani Brijlal Shrawan	6,753	12.38%	New
JP	Vasave Vinayakrao Gajarya	2,453	4.50%	▼12.01
Margin of victory		38,604	70.75%	▲61.44
Turnout		56,945	49.10%	▼7.57
Total valid votes		54,563		
Registered electors		1,15,974		▲8.16
INC(I) hold		Swing	▲41.17	

=== Assembly Election 1978 ===
1978 Maharashtra Legislative Assembly election : Navapur
Party	Candidate	Votes	%	±%
INC(I)	Vasave Zina Samya	24,572	41.95%	New
INC	Valvi Surupsing Fulji	19,116	32.64%	▼47.70
JP	Vasava Sattarsing Sona	9,669	16.51%	New
CPI	Chaure Dharma Gangaram	4,281	7.31%	New
Independent	Gavit Rudha Rajya	931	1.59%	New
Margin of victory		5,456	9.32%	▼60.20
Turnout		62,885	58.65%	▲10.85
Total valid votes		58,569		
Registered electors		1,07,229		▲15.31
INC(I) gain from INC		Swing	▼38.39	

=== Assembly Election 1972 ===
1972 Maharashtra Legislative Assembly election : Navapur
Party	Candidate	Votes	%	±%
INC	Surupsingh Hirya Naik	32,700	80.34%	▲38.16
Independent	Shrawan Rama Gaikw Ad	4,405	10.82%	New
Independent	Kantilal Raogi Vasave	3,597	8.84%	New
Margin of victory		28,295	69.52%	▲46.78
Turnout		43,326	46.59%	▲3.29
Total valid votes		40,702		
Registered electors		92,991		▲18.63
INC hold		Swing	▲38.16	

=== Assembly Election 1967 ===
1967 Maharashtra Legislative Assembly election : Navapur
Party	Candidate	Votes	%	±%
INC	Dharma Jayaram Kokani	13,383	42.18%	▲8.27
ABJS	F. R. Valvi	6,169	19.44%	▲7.08
CPI	K. R. Vasave	5,440	17.14%	▼9.43
Independent	B. S. Kokni	5,194	16.37%	New
Independent	T. A. Sane	1,545	4.87%	New
Margin of victory		7,214	22.73%	▲15.98
Turnout		35,289	45.02%	▼0.41
Total valid votes		31,731		
Registered electors		78,387		▲69.46
INC hold		Swing	▲8.27	

=== Assembly Election 1962 ===
1962 Maharashtra Legislative Assembly election : Navapur
Party	Candidate	Votes	%	±%
INC	Dharma Jayaram Kokani	6,414	33.91%	▲5.77
Independent	Sattarsingh Sona Vasave	5,136	27.15%	New
CPI	Kanthadsing Raoji Vasave	5,026	26.57%	▲6.08
ABJS	Rudha Rajya Gavit	2,338	12.36%	New
Margin of victory		1,278	6.76%	▼12.51
Turnout		21,576	46.64%	▲6.30
Total valid votes		18,914		
Registered electors		46,256		▼18.89
INC gain from Independent		Swing	▼13.50	

=== Assembly Election 1957 ===
1957 Bombay State Legislative Assembly election : Navapur
Party	Candidate	Votes	%	±%
Independent	Chaudhari Abramji Dongarsing (St)	9,352	47.41%	New
INC	Kokani Bakaram Sukaram (St)	5,551	28.14%	New
CPI	Vasava Kanthadsing Raoji (St)	4,042	20.49%	New
Independent	Valvi Ramesh Panya (St)	779	3.95%	New
Margin of victory		3,801	19.27%	New
Turnout		19,724	34.59%	New
Total valid votes		19,724		
Registered electors		57,028		New
Independent gain from PWPI		Swing		

== See also ==
- Nawapur
