= Navapur taluka =

Administrative division

Vadade Navapur Taluka is a taluka in Nandurbar District of the Indian state of Maharashtra. Its headquarters is in the municipality of Navapur.

== Geography ==
Navapur spreads across two states, Maharashtra to the east and Gujarat to the west. Ninety-four panchayat villages are present in Navapur Taluka. Ukai Dam is nearby.

Some of the area is hilly and the inhabited by scheduled tribes. The taluka covers an area of 976.68 square kilometres (377.10 sq mi).

== Economy ==
Navapur Taluka is an agricultural and sand area, known for its pulses and a variety of red chili. It is hosts many poultry farms. The first was started by Shri Hasubhai Desai as Desai Poultry Farm at Uchchhal. The first case of avian flu in India was detected in Navapur in 2006. Vegetable and fruit products are supplied to many states.

Navapur hosts two industrial areas. One is Maharashtra Industrial Development Corporation and the other is Chokhawala industrial area. MIDC is 5 kilometers from Navapur on the east side of Navapur city. Chokhawala industrial area is 5-6 kilometers west of Navapur, 1 kilometer from Gujarat state at Navapur RTO checkpost. Navapur industrial areas include textile mills, oil mills, drainage pipe factory and a rice mill.

Other industries in the Taluka, notably include agro-based industries such as a sugar factory and a tuvar daal mill, as well as other food processing plants. The Golden fruit and vegetable company (G.F.C) was started by Abdul Jalil Abdul Gafur Shaikh, in 1994.

Many tribal members go to Gujarat during the off season to work as labourers in its textile industries.

== History ==
It was on the Mughal trade route going to Agra. Ruins of the Serai and Caravan sentry forts survive.

== Transport ==
Navapur city has two railway stations Navapur Railway Station (west side) and Kolde Railway Station (east side) Both stations connect with National Highway 6 and Asian Highway 46. MIDC is closest to Kolde station. Kolde station includes 2 platforms and a double line. National Highway 6 is expanding from four to six lanes.

The large lake/reservoir impounded by the dam nearby provides some fishing.

== Religion ==
Area temples include the Rokadia Hanumaan, Dutt mandir and Rang Avdhoot Paduka Mandir, Ramji Mandir, Aashapuri Mandir, Sai Baba temple in the Prabhakar colony, and Shabri Mata Mandir.

== Geographical indication ==
Navapur Tur Dal was awarded the Geographical Indication (GI) status tag from the Geographical Indications Registry, under the Union Government of India, on 31 March 2016 and is valid until 25 March 2034.

Baliraja Krushak Bachat Gat from Navapur, proposed the GI registration of 'Navapur Tur Dal'. After filing the application in March 2014, the Tur Dal was granted the GI tag in 2016 by the Geographical Indication Registry in Chennai, making the name "'Navapur Tur Dal" exclusive to the Tur dal cultivated in the region. It thus became the first pigeon pea variety from India and the 15th type of goods from Maharashtra to earn the GI tag.

The GI tag protects the Tur Dal from illegal selling and marketing, and gives it legal protection and a unique identity.
