= Nandurbar Lok Sabha constituency =

Lok Sabha constituency in Maharashtra

Coordinates: 21.4°N 74.2°E

Nandurbar
- Lok Sabha constituency
- Map of Nandurbar Lok Sabha constituency

Constituency details
- Country: India
- Region: Western India
- State: Maharashtra
- Assembly constituencies: Akkalkuwa; Shahada; Nandurbar; Navapur; Sakri; Shirpur
- Established: 1952
- Reservation: ST

Member of Parliament
- 18th Lok Sabha
- Incumbent Gowaal Kagada Padavi
- Party: INC
- Elected year: 2024
- Preceded by: Heena Gavit

Nandurbar is one of the 48 Lok Sabha (parliamentary) constituencies of Maharashtra state in western India. Presently, four of its Vidhan Sabha segments are located in Nandurbar district, while the other two segments are located in Dhule district.

== Assembly segments ==
Presently, after the implementation of the delimitation of the parliamentary constituencies in 2008, Nandurbar Lok Sabha constituency comprises six Vidhan Sabha segments. These segments are:

Constituency number	Name	Reserved for (SC/ST/None)	District	Party	2024 Lead
1	Akkalkuwa	ST	Nandurbar	SHS	INC
2	Shahada	ST	Nandurbar	BJP	INC
3	Nandurbar	ST	Nandurbar	BJP	BJP
4	Navapur	ST	Nandurbar	INC	INC
5	Sakri	ST	Dhule	SHS	INC
9	Shirpur	ST	Dhule	BJP	BJP

Before the delimitation, Nandurbar Lok Sabha constituency comprised the following six Vidhan Sabha (legislative assembly) segments:

1. Nawapur
2. Nandurbar
3. Talode
4. Akrani
5. Shahade
6. Shirpur

== Members of Parliament ==
Year	Member	Party
1952	Shaligram Bharatiya	Indian National Congress
1952	Jayantrao Natwadakar	Indian National Congress
1957	Laxman Valvi	Indian National Congress
1962	Laxman Valvi	Indian National Congress
1967	Tukaram Gavit	Indian National Congress
1971	Tukaram Gavit	Indian National Congress
1977	Surupsingh Hirya Naik	Indian National Congress
1980	Surupsingh Hirya Naik	Indian National Congress
1981^	Manikrao Gavit	Indian National Congress
1984	Manikrao Gavit	Indian National Congress
1989	Manikrao Gavit	Indian National Congress
1991	Manikrao Gavit	Indian National Congress
1996	Manikrao Gavit	Indian National Congress
1998	Manikrao Gavit	Indian National Congress
1999	Manikrao Gavit	Indian National Congress
2004	Manikrao Gavit	Indian National Congress
2009	Manikrao Gavit	Indian National Congress
2014	Heena Gavit	Bharatiya Janata Party
2019	Heena Gavit	Bharatiya Janata Party
2024	Gowaal Kagada Padavi	Indian National Congress

^ denotes by-poll

== Election results ==
=== 2024 ===
2024 Indian general elections: Nandurbar
Party	Candidate	Votes	%	±%
INC	Gowaal Kagada Padavi	745,998	53.53	▲11.13
BJP	Heena Gavit	5,86,878	42.11	▼7.75
NOTA	None of the Above	14,123	1.01	▼0.70
Majority		1,59,120	11.42	▲3.96
Turnout		13,93,669	70.68	▲2.03
INC gain from BJP		Swing		

=== 2019 ===
2019 Indian general elections: Nandurbar
Party	Candidate	Votes	%	±%
BJP	Dr. Heena Vijaykumar Gavit	639,136	49.86	▼2.03
INC	Kagda. C. Padavi	5,43,507	42.40	▲0.80
VBA	Anturlikar Sushil Suresh	25,702	2.01	New
Independent	Dr. Suhas Natawadkar	13,722	1.08	N/A
NOTA	None of the Above	21,925	1.71	▼0.18
Majority		95,629	7.46	▼2.11
Turnout		12,84,546	68.65	▲1.88
BJP hold		Swing		

=== General elections 2014 ===
2014 Indian general elections: Nandurbar
Party	Candidate	Votes	%	±%
BJP	Dr. Heena Gavit	579,486	51.89	▲26.31
INC	Manikrao Gavit	4,72,581	42.32	▲6.31
BSP	Adv. Vasave Amit Sheklal	12,133	1.08	N/A
Independent	Adv.Sobji Devalya Gavit	9,184	0.82	N/A
Independent	C.S.Valvi	6,004	0.54	N/A
BBM	Arjunsingh Divansingh Vasave	4,712	0.42	N/A
Independent	Mahesh Jaysing Pawara	4,389	0.39	N/A
AAP	Virendra Ravaji Valvi	3,511	0.31	N/A
BMP	Ranjit Jugla Padvi	3,498	0.31	N/A
NOTA	None of the Above	21,178	1.89	N/A
Majority		1,06,905	9.57	▲4.24
Turnout		11,17,024	66.77	▲14.13
BJP gain from INC		Swing	▲26.31	

=== General elections 2009 ===
2009 Indian general elections: Nandurbar
Party	Candidate	Votes	%	±%
INC	Manikrao Gavit	275,936	36.01	
SP	Sharad Gavit	2,35,093	30.68	
BJP	Suhas Natawadkar	1,95,987	25.58	
Majority		40,843	5.33	
Turnout		7,66,240	52.64	
INC hold		Swing		

=== 1981 by-poll ===
In 1981, a bye-election was held in for the Nandurbar seat due to the resignation of the sitting MP, S.S. Naik. The election was won by the INC candidate Manikrao Hodlya Gavit with 188550 votes, while the runner-up was A.S.F. Jadhav of Janata Party with 61157 votes.

== See also ==
- Nandurbar district
- Dhule district
- List of constituencies of the Lok Sabha
