= Nandurbar district =

- District of Maharashtra
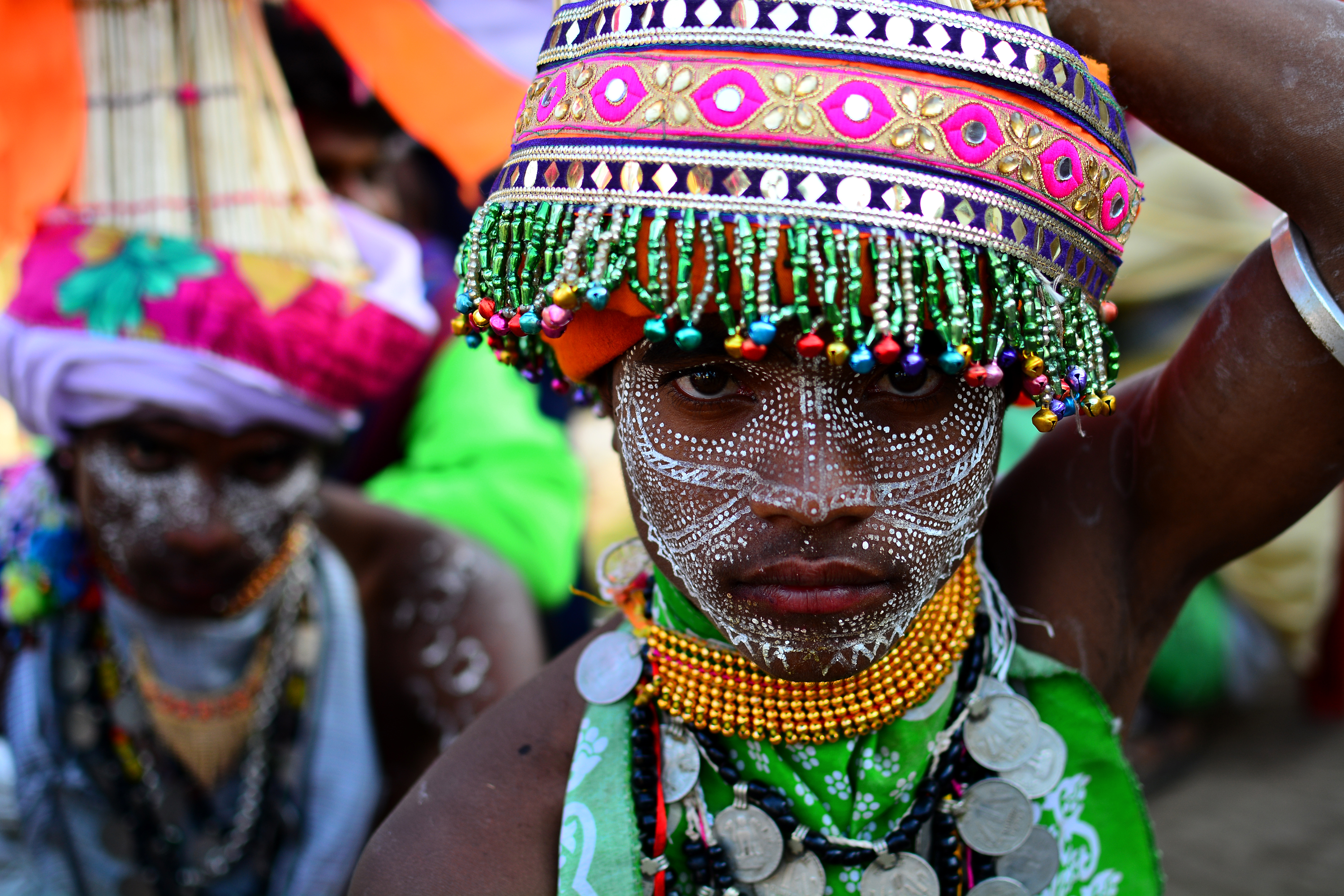
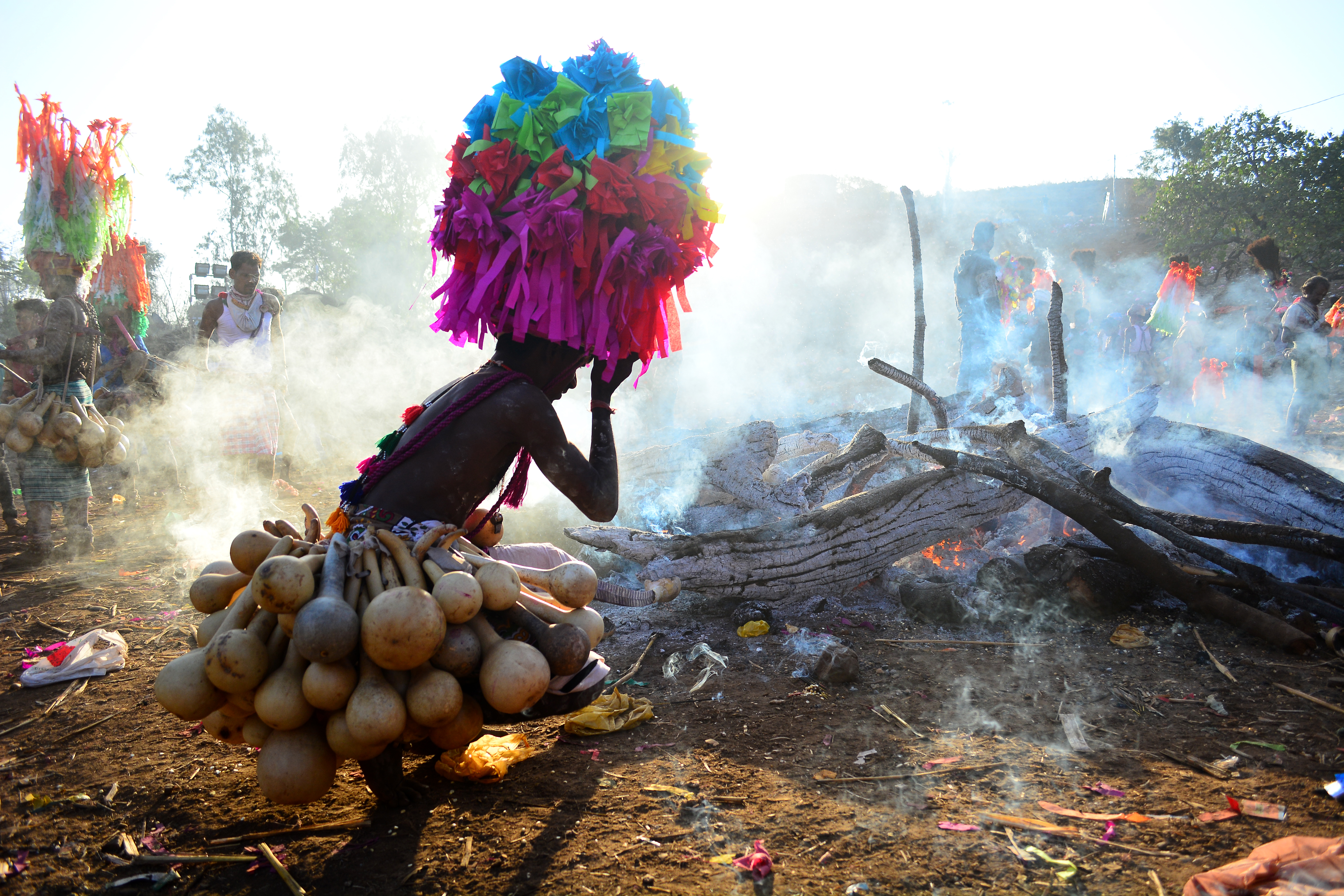
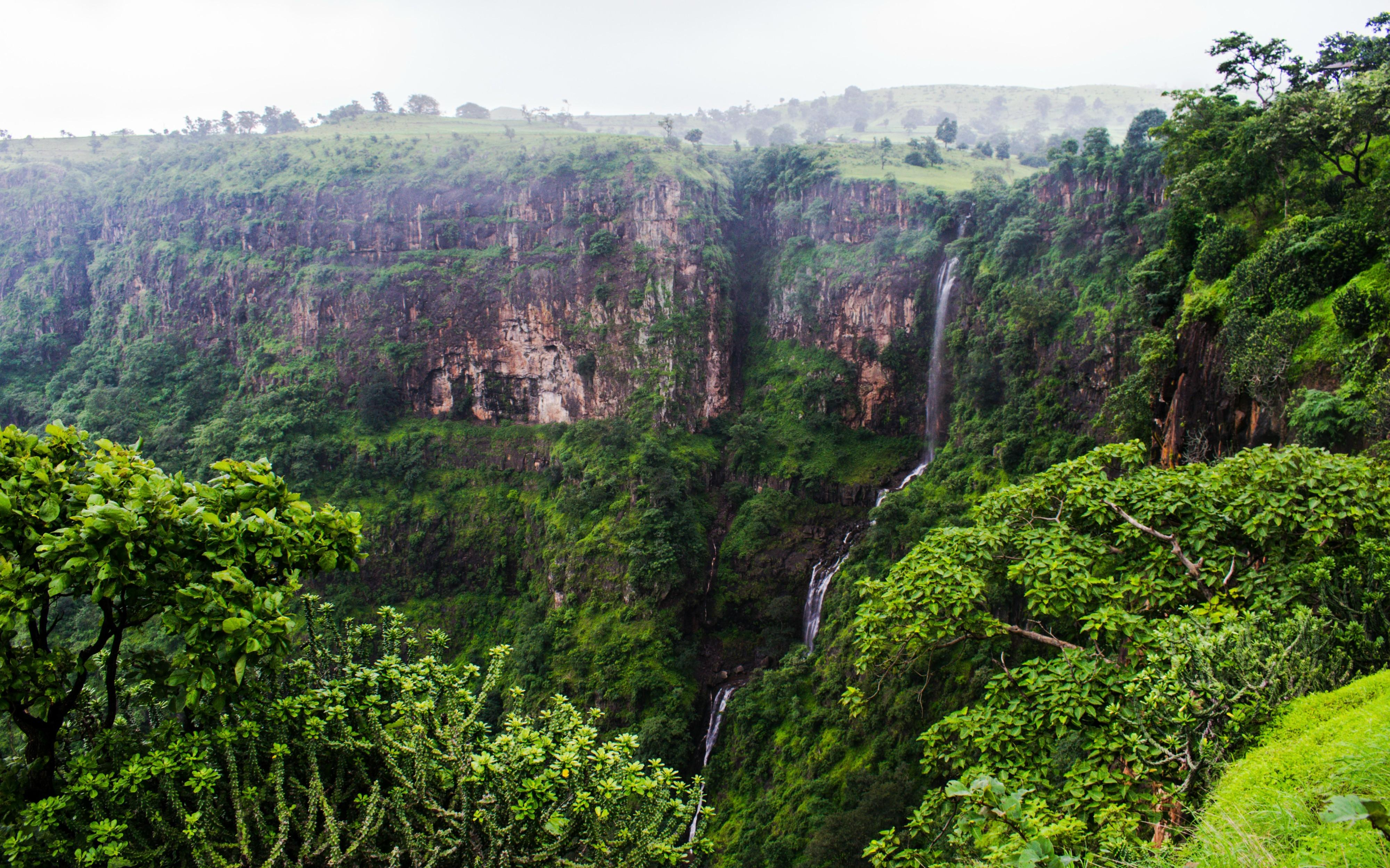
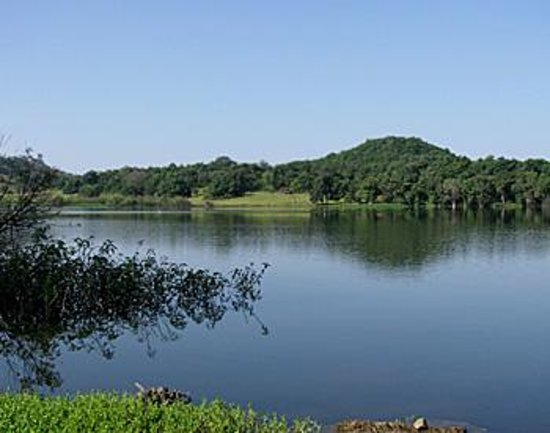
- Kathi Holi, Toranmal-Nandurbar, Yeshwant Lake

- Location in Maharashtra
- Nandurbar district
- Coordinates: 21°23′N 74°22′E
- Country: India
- State: Maharashtra
- Division: Nashik
- Established: 1 July 1998
- Named for: Aadivasi (tribal)
- Headquarters: Nandurbar
- Talukas: 1. Shahada; 2. Nandurbar; 3. Navapur; 4. Taloda; 5. Akkalkuwa; 6. Dhadgaon

Government
  - Body: Nandurbar Zilla Parishad
  - Guardian Minister: Hasan Mushrif; (Nationalist Congress Party )
  - President Zilla Parishad: *President; Mrs. Adv. Seema Padmakar Valavi; *Vice President; Mr. Adv. Ram Chandrakant Raghuvanshi
  - District Collector: Dr. Mittali Sethi (IAS)
  - CEO Zilla Parishad: Mr. Raghunath Gawde (IAS)
  - MPs: *Gowaal Kagada Padavi; (Nandurbar)

Area
  - Total: 5,955 km^{2} (2,299 sq mi)
  - Rank: Area Rank (Maharashtra): 26th.

Population (2011)
  - Total: 1,648,295
  - Density: 260/km^{2} (670/sq mi)

Language
  - Official: Marathi
  - Spoken: Aadivasi, Bhili, Gujari and various dialects of Bhili and Kokani tribal languages
- Time zone: UTC+5:30 (IST)
- Postal code: 425412
- Telephone code: 91-2564
- ISO 3166 code: IN-MH-NB
- Vehicle registration: MH-39
- Sex ratio: 975 ♂/♀
- Literacy: 64.38%%
- Website: nandurbar.gov.in

Nandurbar district (Marathi pronunciation: [nən̪d̪uɾbaːɾ]) is an administrative district in the northwest corner of Maharashtra state in India. On 1 July 1998 Dhule was bifurcated as two separate districts now known as Dhule and Nandurbar. Nandurbar is a tribal-dominated district with its headquarters located at Nandurbar city. The district occupies an area of 5,955 square kilometres (2,299 sq mi) and has a population of 1,648,295 of which 16.71% were urban (as of 2011).

Nandurbar district is bounded to the south and south-east by Dhule district, to the west and north is the state of Gujarat, to the north and north-east is the state of Madhya Pradesh. The northern boundary of the district is defined by the Narmada River.

== Politicians ==
=== Members of Parliament ===
- *Gowaal Kagada Padavi (INC)
- (Nandurbar)

=== Guardian ministers ===
Guardian Minister of Nandurbar
- पालकमंत्री नंदुरबार
- Emblem of India
- Incumbent: Hasan Mushrif; Cabinet Minister; since 17 April 2026
- Style: The Honourable
- Appointer: Chief Minister of Maharashtra
- Term length: 5 years – No time limit
- Website: nandurbar.gov.in/en/

==== list of Guardian Minister ====
Name	Term of office
Girish Bapat; Cabinet Minister	31 October 2014 - 23 May 2019
Ram Shinde; Cabinet Minister; Additional Charge	23 May 2019- 8 November 2019
Adv. Kagda Chandya Padvi; Cabinet Minister	9 January 2020 - 29 June 2022
Dr.Vijaykumar Gavit; Cabinet Minister	24 September 2022 - 4 October 2023
Anil Bhaidas Patil; Cabinet Minister	4 October 2023 - 17 April 2026

=== District Magistrate/Collector ===
District Magistrate – Collector Nandurbar
- जिल्हाधिकारी आणि जिल्हा दंडाधिकरी नंदुरबार
- Emblem of India
- Incumbent; Dr. Mittali Sethi (IAS) since 2024
- Residence: At Nandurbar district
- Appointer: Government of Maharashtra
- Term length: No time limit
- Website: nandurbar.gov.in/en/

==== list of District Magistrate – Collector ====
Name	Term of office
Dr Mittali Sethi(IAS)	2024 - Incumbent

== Divisions ==
The district comprises six talukas. These talukas are Nandurbar, Navapur, Shahada, Taloda, Akkalkuwa and Akrani Mahal (also called Dhadgaon).

There is one Lok Sabha constituency in the district which is Nandurbar (ST) reserved for Scheduled Tribes. There are four Maharashtra Assembly seats namely Akkalkuwa (ST), Shahada (ST), Nandurbar (ST), Nawapur (ST).

Sakri and Shirpur assembly seats from Dhule district are also part of Nandurbar Lok Sabha seat. Nandurbar is primarily a tribal (Adiwasi) district.

== History ==
Nandurbar is a part of Satpuda Pradesh, meaning Seven Hills Region. The district was part of the district with Dhule and Jalgaon till July 1998. The ancient name of the region was Rasika, when Nandurbar was also called Nandanagri after the name of its king Nandaraja.

On 3 June 1818 the Maratha Peshwa surrendered Khandesh to the British rule.

== Demographics ==
=== Population ===
Historical population
Year	Pop.	±% p.a.
1901	191,238	—
1911	238,612	+2.24%
1921	253,399	+0.60%
1931	304,918	+1.87%
1941	360,685	+1.69%
1951	452,166	+2.29%
1961	565,958	+2.27%
1971	692,467	+2.04%
1981	848,010	+2.05%
1991	1,062,545	+2.28%
2001	1,311,709	+2.13%
2011	1,648,295	+2.31%

According to the 2011 census Nandurbar district has a population of 1,648,295, roughly equal to the nation of Guinea-Bissau similar to the US state of Idaho. This gives it a ranking of 304th in India (out of a total of 640). The district has a population density of 276 inhabitants per square kilometre (710/sq mi) .

=== Languages ===
Languages in Nandurbar district (2011)
1. Bhili (45.5%)
2. Marathi (16.1%)
3. Khandeshi (10.5%)
4. Pawri (7.34%)
5. Mawchi (4.40%)
6. Urdu (3.79%)
7. Kukna (2.61%)
8. Hindi (2.55%)
9. Gujarati (1.90%)
10. Gujari (1.62%)
11. Others (3.82%)

==== Main languages ====
At the time of the 2011 Census of India, 45.45% of the population in the district spoke Bhili, 16.06% Marathi, 10.46% Khandeshi, 7.34% Pawri, 4.40% Mawchi, 3.79% Urdu, 2.61% Kukna, 2.55% Hindi, 1.91% Gujarati and 1.62% speak Gujari as their first language mostly by Gurjars.

==== Other languages ====
Aadivasi (tribal) Languages spoken include Ahirani, a Khandeshi tongue with approximately 780,000 speakers, similar to Marathi and Bhili. and Pauri Bareli, a Bhil and other tribal language with approximately 175 000 speakers, written in the Devanagari script.

=== Religion ===
Religions in Nandurbar district (2011)
Religion	Percent
Hinduism	92.31%
Islam	5.84%
Christianity	0.51%
Other or not stated	0.34%

=== Literacy rate and sex ratio ===
The population growth rate over the decade 2001–2011 was 25.5%. Nandurbar has a sex ratio of 972 females for every 1000 males, and a literacy rate of 64.38%. 12.25% of the population live in urban areas. Scheduled Castes and Scheduled Tribes make up 2.91% and 69.28% of the population respectively The Bhils form the major group in the district.

As of 2001 India census, Nandurbar District had a population of 1,309,135, being 50.62% male and 49.38% female. Nandurbar District has an average literacy rate of 46.63%: male literacy is 55.11%, and female literacy is 37.93%.

== Economy ==
In 2006 the Ministry of Panchayati Raj named Nandurbar one of the country's 250 most backward districts (out of a total of 640 districts). It is one of the twelve districts in Maharashtra currently receiving funds from the Backward Regions Grant Fund Programme (BRGF).

== Notable people ==
- Heena Gavit (Former Member of Parliament from Nandurbar Constituency)
- Vijaykumar Gavit (Member of the Legislative Assembly from Nandurbar Constituency)
- Adv. K. C. Padavi (Member of the Legislative Assembly from Akkalkuwa Constituency)
- Rajesh Padvi (Member of the Legislative Assembly from Shahada Constituency)
- Shirishkumar Surupsing Naik (Member of the Legislative Assembly from Navapur Constituency)
- Manikrao Hodlya Gavit (Former member of parliament from Nandurbar Constituency and former member of the Legislative Assembly from Navapur Constituency)

== Climate ==
Nandurbar

Climate chart (precipitation, max. and min. temperature)
J	F	M	A	M	J	J	A	S	O	N	D
7 25 11	1.2 27 13	1.4 32 18	1.8 37 22	9.2 38 25	109 33 25	374 28 23	135 27 22	123 30 21	40 31 19	16 28 15	3.5 25 12
- █ Average max. and min. temperatures in °C
- █ Precipitation totals in mm
Imperial conversion
J	F	M	A	M	J	J	A	S	O	N	D
0.3 77 52	0 81 55	0.1 90 64	0.1 99 72	0.4 100 77	4.3 91 77	15 82 73	5.3 81 72	4.8 86 70	1.6 88 66	0.6 82 59	0.1 77 54
- █ Average max. and min. temperatures in °F
- █ Precipitation totals in inches

The climate of Nandurbar District is generally Hot and Dry. As the rest of India Nandurbar District has three distinct seasons: summer, monsoon (rainy) and the winter season.

Summer is from March to mid of June. Summers are usually hot and dry. During the month of May the summer is at its peak. Temperatures can be as high as 45 °C (113 °F) during the peak of Summer. The Monsoon sets in during the mid or end of June. During this season the weather is usually humid and hot. The northern and western regions receive more rainfall than the rest of the region. The average rainfall is 767 mm (30.2 in) through the district. Winter is from the month of November to February. Winters are mildly cold but dry.

Seasons	Start	End
Summer	March	Mid June
Monsoon	mid June	October
Winter	November	February

Climate data for Nandurbar
Month	Jan	Feb	Mar	Apr	May	Jun	Jul	Aug	Sep	Oct	Nov	Dec	Year
Mean daily maximum °C (°F)	25 (77)	27 (81)	36 (97)	42 (108)	43 (109)	35 (95)	28 (82)	27 (81)	30 (86)	31 (88)	28 (82)	25 (77)	31 (89)
Mean daily minimum °C (°F)	11 (52)	13 (55)	18 (64)	22 (72)	25 (77)	25 (77)	23 (73)	22 (72)	21 (70)	19 (66)	15 (59)	12 (54)	19 (66)
Average precipitation mm (inches)	7.00 (0.28)	1.18 (0.05)	1.42 (0.06)	1.79 (0.07)	9.15 (0.36)	108.62 (4.28)	373.63 (14.71)	134.91 (5.31)	122.75 (4.83)	40.40 (1.59)	16.39 (0.65)	3.49 (0.14)	820.73 (32.33)
