= List of dams in Parner taluka =

There are around 7 large dams in Parner taluka of Ahmednagar district of state of Maharashtra.

== Dams in Parner taluka by specifications- ==
The Table below list dams of Parner taluka of Ahmednagar district in the Indian state of Maharashtra by their specifications.

Name of dam	Year completed	River	Location	Type	Height (m)	Length (m)	Volume content (10^{3}m^{3})	Gross storage capacity (10^{3}m^{3})	Reservoir area (10^{3}m^{2})	Effective storage capacity (10^{3}m^{3})	Purpose	Designed spillway capacity (m^{3}/s)
Tikhol Dam	1975	Kalu	Tikhol	TE	18.53	360		2430	64	1700	Irrigation	848
Hanga Dam	1978	Hanga	Hanga	TE	15.84	390	135	1850	500	1340	Irrigation	1010
Palashi Dam	1979	Palashi	Palashi	TE	14.03	660		1060	28	860	Irrigation	690
Mandohol Dam	1979	Mandohol	Mandohol	TE	27.07	739	426	11300	199.51	8780	Irrigation	11420
Rui Chatrapati Dam	1980	Gopal Ganga	Rui Chatrapati	TE	10.77	420	16.73	1350	46	1070	Irrigation	565
Lonimavla Dam	1981	Local Nallah	Lonimavla	TE	10	958	114	1080	46	880	Irrigation	377
Dhoki Dam	1981	Kalu	Dhoki	TE	17.33	397	92.03	1270	290	1240	Irrigation	1046
