= Plassey (disambiguation) =

Palashi, formerly Plassey, is a town in West Bengal, India

Palashi or Plassey may also refer to:

Palashi

  - Plassey railway station, a stop near the town on Indian Railways
  - Plassey College, a general degree college in Palashi
  - Battle of Plassey, fought there in 1757 during the Seven Years War
    - Palashi Monument
- Palashi, North 24 Parganas, town in West Bengal, India
- Palashi, Parner, Village in Maharashtra, India
  - Palashi Dam
- Plassey, County Clare, the estate of Robert Clive, victor of the battle
- Plassey, County Limerick, also named for the battle
- MV Plassey, a freighter named for the locations in Ireland

== See also ==
- Plessey (disambiguation)
