= Stannington =

Stannington may refer to several things in England:

- Stannington, Northumberland, a village
  - Stannington railway station, served the Northumberland village
  - Stannington Sanatorium, a children's hospital near the Northumberland village
- Stannington, Sheffield, a suburb
- Stannington (ward), an electoral district in Sheffield
- Heaton Stannington F.C., a football club in Newcastle
