= Bhamer Dhule =

Village in Maharashtra

- Bhamer, Dhule

Site information
- Owner: Govt. of India
- Open to the public: yes
- Condition: dilapidated

Location
- Shown within Maharashtra
- Location within Maharashtra
- Coordinates: 21.07°N 74.33°E
- Height: 650 m

Site history
- Materials: Stone, Limestone and Lead

Garrison information
- Occupants: Ahirs, Faruqis, Holkars, British

Bhamer, is a village with a historical fort in Sakri tehsil of Maharashtra state in India. It is situated at the foot of a great fortified hill lying 48.28 km (30.00 mi) north-west from Dhule city and 4.82 km (3.00 mi) south of Nijampur.

== History ==
In the olden days, it was a stone-built town surrounded by a parapet wall. Today it is no more than a village strewn with ruins of the old buildings. The wall surrounding it has become loose and broken down in many places. On the west is a gate flanked by two round towers, almost in ruins, with two monolithic stone pillars about 2.743 metres (9.00 feet) high and four gate posts, one of them in its place and the others lying at some distance.

The old stone palace with two entrance gates and which served as a government office during Peshwa's time is almost tottering. We have letter (10 July 1764) that proves Sambhaji Gole was the subedar of Bhamer Fort. This period belong to shinde. On one of these gates is carved an animal like a heraldic lion, with a circular shield on the right. At either end is an archway and between the arches on each side of the roadway is a raised terrace between 1.524 and 1.628 metres (5.00 and 5.34 ft) high. On each terrace stand two pillars each of the height of about 3.66 metres (12.0 feet) and behind each pillar in the side wall is a pilaster, and in each end wall in a line with the pillars are other pilasters.

There is a hemadpanti or as it is locally known as Gavali Raj reservoir near this gateway. Not far from it, ruins of a mosque could be seen.

=== Bhamer Fort ===
Bhamer is known for its fort known after the village name and more so for the caves or rather monks dwellings that are in the escarpments of the hills above the village. The fort located at the cast end of a rugged irregular range of rocky hills is divided from the rest of the range by an artificial chasm. The natural escarpment of the fort that overlooks the village has been strengthened in places by masonry constructions. Though the hill is of a considerable height, the ascent is easy and roundabout. On the southern face is the entrance leading into the fort. Inside are several cisterns of good water as also four large store rooms hollowed out of the rock. There are many ruined gateways and gates and nearly ruined towers. Time has also withered away the artificial fortifications at many places. It is supposed that the town was destroyed while punishing Kale Khan, a Muslim rebel, who had seized it in 1736. It never regained its original glory.

A remarkable feature in the fort is that its buildings are mostly underground, the escarpment being honeycombed with caves, some of them plain and shapeless, but others regular buildings with pillar-supported roofs. These caves are locally known as Gavali Raja's houses. Some of these seem to be of great age while yet others apparently much modern. All the important caves face south-west, and are nearly on one level like the ones at Ellora (Verul) in Aurangabad district.

The rock generally overhangs the doorways and another rising in front forms a sort of a parapet. The first set of three caves open into each other. The middle cave about 2.229 m2 (24 sq. ft.) is the largest. The partition walls are very thin and there is no carving. Tool marks all over the walls indicate that the caves are not only artificial but also unfinished. The next set of caves, also three in number, consists of a large irregularly shaped central and two side caves divided by rock partitions through both of which openings have been made. The roof of the central cave is supported by three columns of rock left to serve as pillars. In two of these pillars, grooves, one in each pillar, have been cut, apparently to support lamps or screen.

Beyond this second group are two other caves neither of which is remarkable. About 45.720 metres (50.000 yards) further is a water cave divided by a wall of rock about 431 millimetres (17.0 in) thick. The mouth of this reservoir has been divided lengthwise into three parts by using two stone pillars.

The next group of three caves was formerly used as the fort office. Of these three caves, the first is divided by two rows of regularly shaped pillars with pilasters corresponding to them in the walls. It has had a verandah 22.555 metres (74.00 feet) in length with an unfinished cell at the left. The doorway has a lintel. The side posts are fluted to the ground and moulded about half way down. In the fluting below the moulded part, are, on the left side of the doorway, two figures about 0.431 metres (15 inches) high. They seem to be male and female serving as chopdars or mace bearers. There is also an unidentifiable figure on the right doorpost. There are a number of rude sculptures on the walls of these caves, of Jain Tirthankara Parshvanath and other Jain Tirthankaras and protecting deities yaksha and yakshinis, much defaced from the decay of the rock, but apparently of the same coarse rough type as those on the Chamar Leni hill. The second cave is in very good preservation and its pillars are divided into successive portions, alternately round and square. The third cave is like, the other two.

Beyond these three caves, with a long narrow opening, is a great square hole about 6.09 metres (20.0 feet) deep and a little more than 6.09 metres (20.0 feet) long and broad. This was used as a dungeon for the prisoners. On the other side of the hill, facing north-east, is an unimportant cave. and in the same side facing north towards Nijampur, is a whole range of caves said to be inaccessible.

== See also ==
- List of forts in Maharashtra
- Khandesh
- Abhiras of Bhambhagiri
