= Kasare =

Kasare may refer to several places in Maharashtra, India:

- Kasare, Dhule, a panchayat village in Sakri Taluka, Dhule District
- Kasare, Nandurbar, a village in Nawapur Taluka, Nandurbar District
- Kasare, Parner, a village in Parner Taluka, Ahmednagar District
- Kasare, Sangamner, a village in Sangamner Taluka, Ahmednagar District
