= Kasare, Dhule =

Village in Maharashtra

Kasare
- village
- Location in Maharashtra, India Kasare (India)
- Coordinates: 20°56′57″N 74°15′33″E
- Country: India
- State: Maharashtra
- District: Dhule
- Taluka: Sakri

Government
  - Body: Village panchayat
- Elevation: 450 m (1,480 ft)

Population (2001)
  - Total: 7,691

Languages
  - Official: Marathi
- Time zone: UTC+5:30 (IST)
- PIN: 424310
- Lok Sabha constituency: Nandurbar
- Vidhan Sabha constituency: Sakri

Kasare is a panchayat village that is located in Sakri Taluka subdivision of Dhule district in Maharashtra, India. The village is located on the south bank of the Panjhra River 10 km (6.2 miles) by road south-west of the town Sakri.

== Demographics ==
In a 2001 census, Kasare had 7,691 inhabitants, of which 3,917 were males (50.9%) and 3,774 were females (49.1%), for a gender distribution of 963 females per thousand males. Most of the population in Kasare are Hindus. There are several temples in the village.

== Notable people ==
- Yashvantrao Sakharam Desale was the first MLA (Member of the Legislative Assembly) from Kasare; he was awarded the Tamra Patra honour by Indira Gandhi for his opposition to the British Raj.
- Aacharya late Shri. Govindrao Ramchandra Chandratre was aastrologer and known personality from Kasare. He was involved in each and every social devotional events in Kasare. He was successfully running this responsibility since 90 years. He died in 2021 and nowadays his son Aacharya Shri. Anil Govindrao Chandratre takes this responsibility.

== See also ==
- Sakri
