= St. Mary's Park =

St. Mary's Park may refer to:

== Ireland ==
- St. Mary's Park (Limerick), a housing estate
- St Mary's Park, the grounds of Castleblayney Faughs GFC

== United Kingdom ==
- St. Mary's Park, Northumberland, England, a housing estate
- St Mary's Park, Whitechapel, now Altab Ali Park, London, England
- St Mary's Park (ward), a defunct ward replaced by St Mary's (Wandsworth ward), London, England

== Other countries ==
- St Mary's Park (Saint Kitts and Nevis), a cricket ground and former football ground
- St. Mary's Park (Bronx), New York City, U.S., a public park

== See also ==
- St. Mary's Square (disambiguation)
