= Tomb of Mir Madan =

Tomb in West Bengal

- An ASI Listed Monument
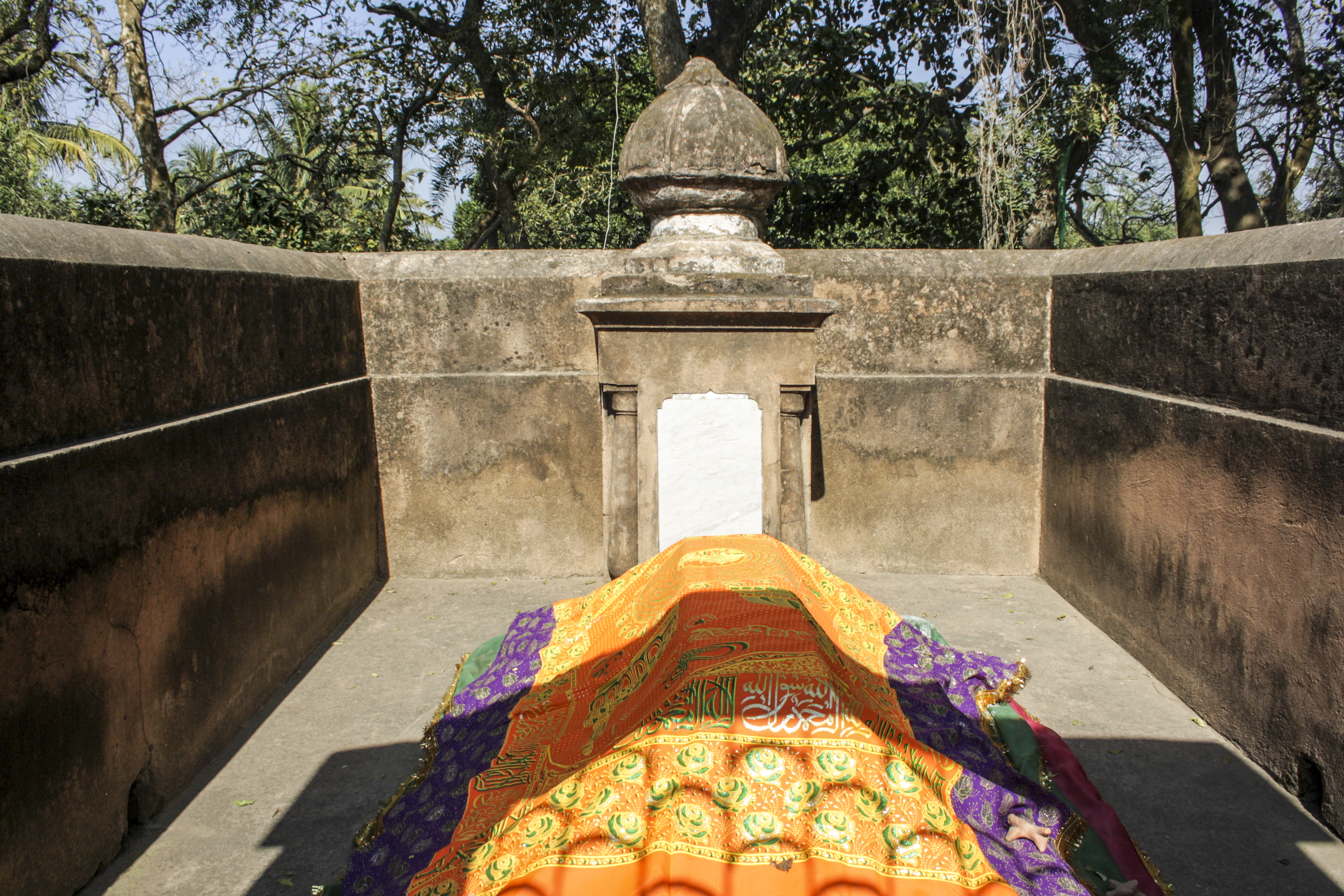

- Location within West Bengal Location within India

General information
- Location: Murshidabad district, Faridpur, India
- Coordinates: 23.8476°N 88.2301°E
- Completed: 1757
- Owner: Archaeological Survey of India

Tomb of Mir Madan is located at Faridpur, in the Beldanga II CD block in the Berhampore subdivision of Murshidabad district.

According to the List of Monuments of National Importance in West Bengal, the Tomb of Mir Madan is an ASI Listed Monument.

== Geography ==
Cities, towns and locations in the Berhampore and Kandi subdivisions, Murshidabad district
M: municipal town, CT: census town, R: rural/ urban centre, H: historical centres
Owing to space constraints in the small map, the actual locations in a larger map may vary slightly

=== Location ===
The Tomb of Mir Madan is located at 23.8476°N 88.2301°E.

Note: The map alongside presents some of the notable locations in the subdivisions. All places marked in the map are linked in the larger full screen map.

== Mir Madan ==
Mir Madan was one of the most trusted officers and chief of the artillery of Nawab Siraj Ud Dowla. On 23 June 1757, in the Battle of Plassey, Mir Madan fought for the Nawab whereas Commander-in-chief Mir Jafar and others remained standstill. Madan's troops caused a serious pressure on the forces of the East India Company. At 2 pm on that day, he was mortally wounded by a British cannonball and died. His two fellow fighters, Nawe Singh Hajari and Bahadur Khan, also died.

Some cadres of his troop buried him secretly in Faridpur village, Rejinagar, near the Palashi battlefield. This place is known as Farid Shah's Dargah (Mosque).

== Gallery ==
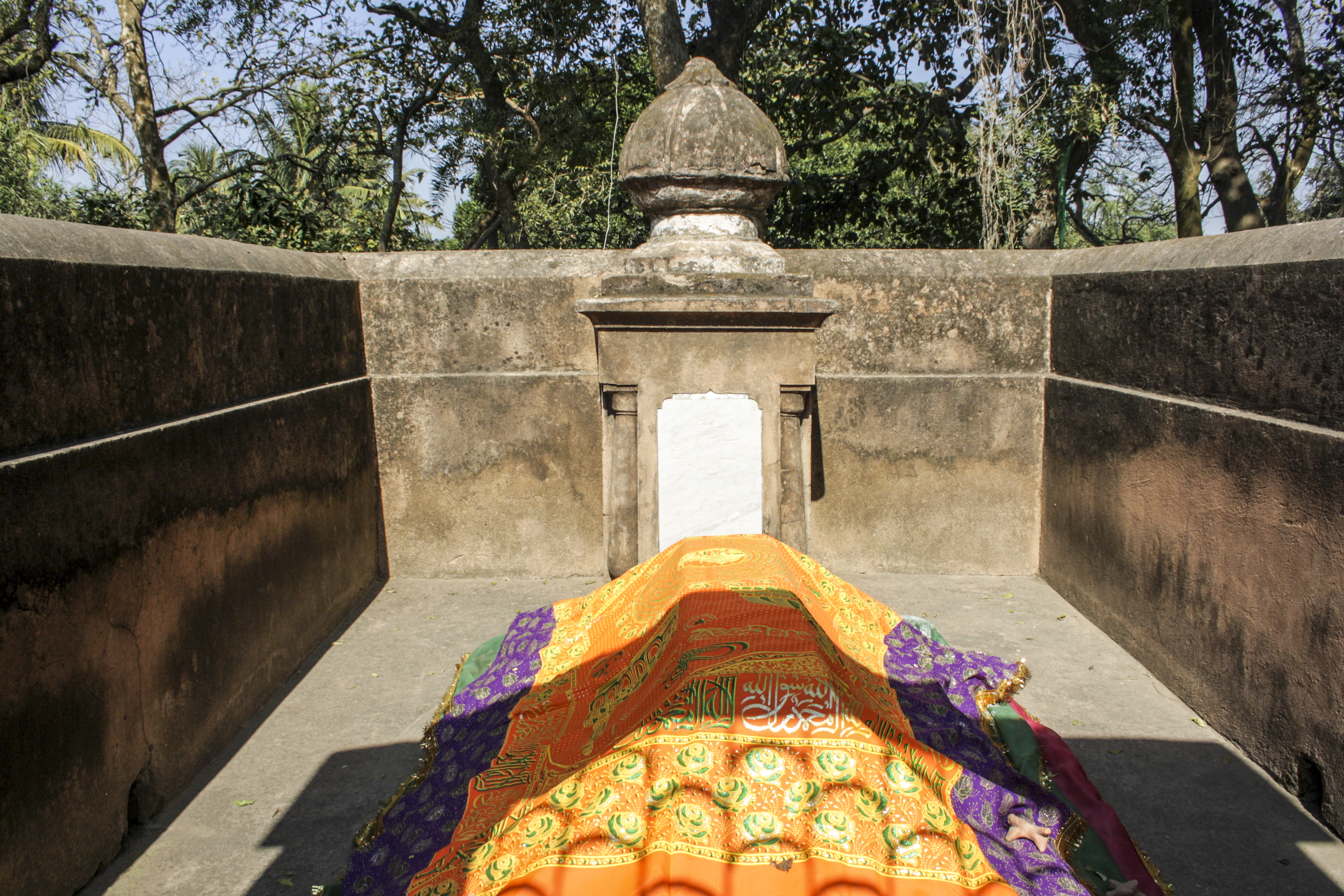
Mir Madan’s tomb

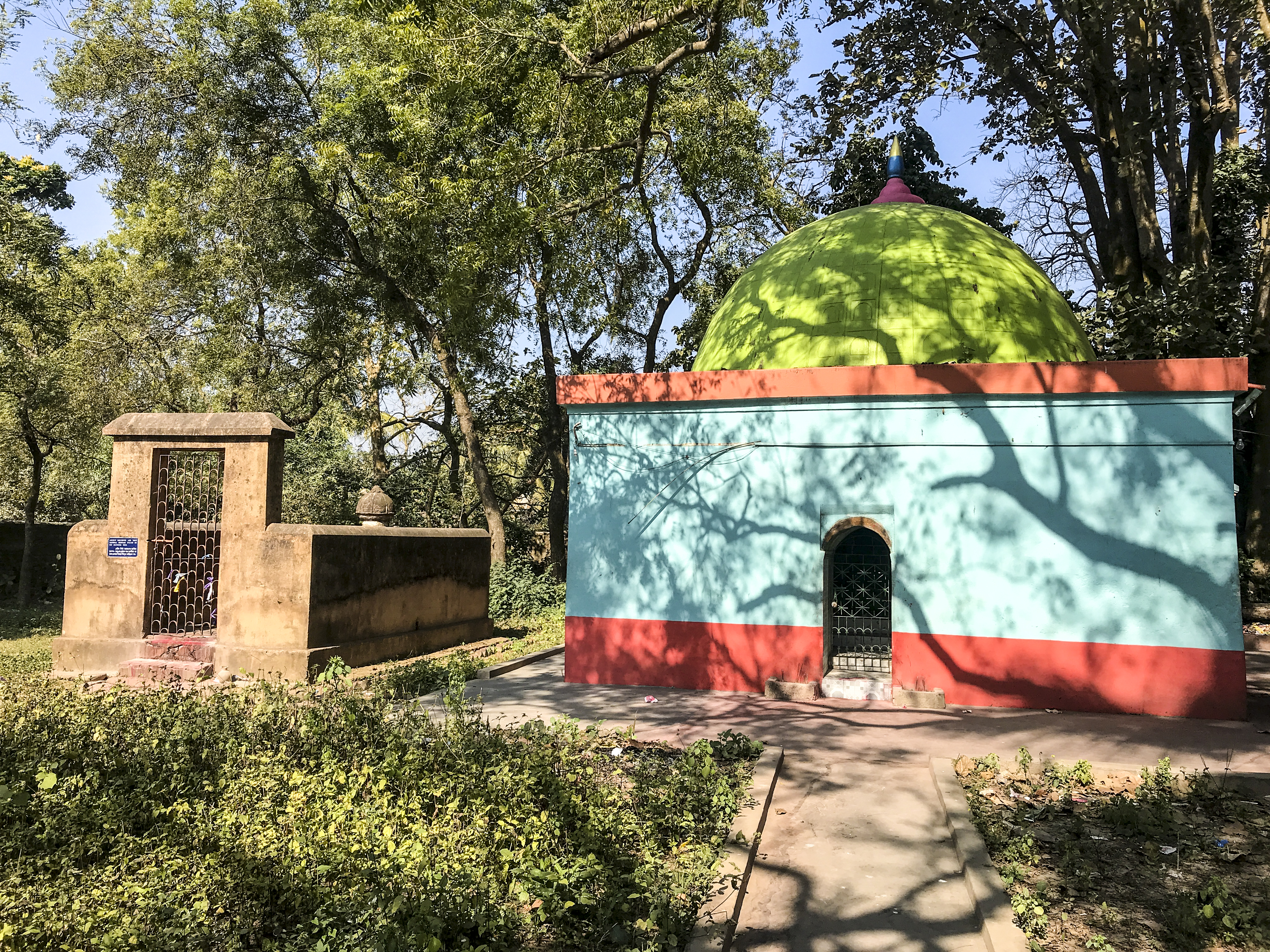
Mir Madan’s tomb (left) and Farid Shah's darga (right)

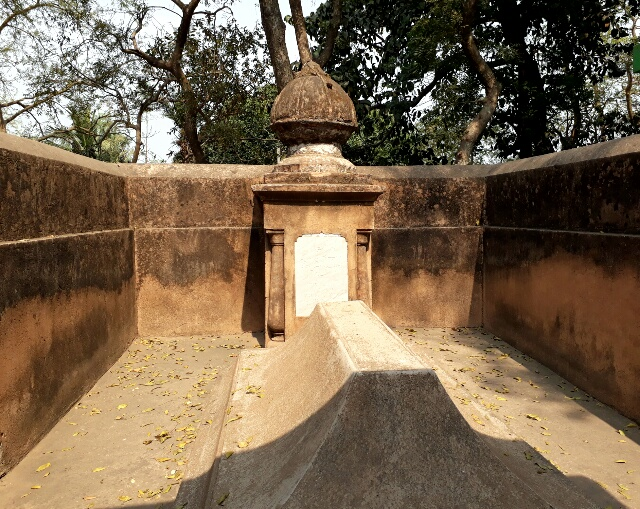
Mir Madan’s tomb

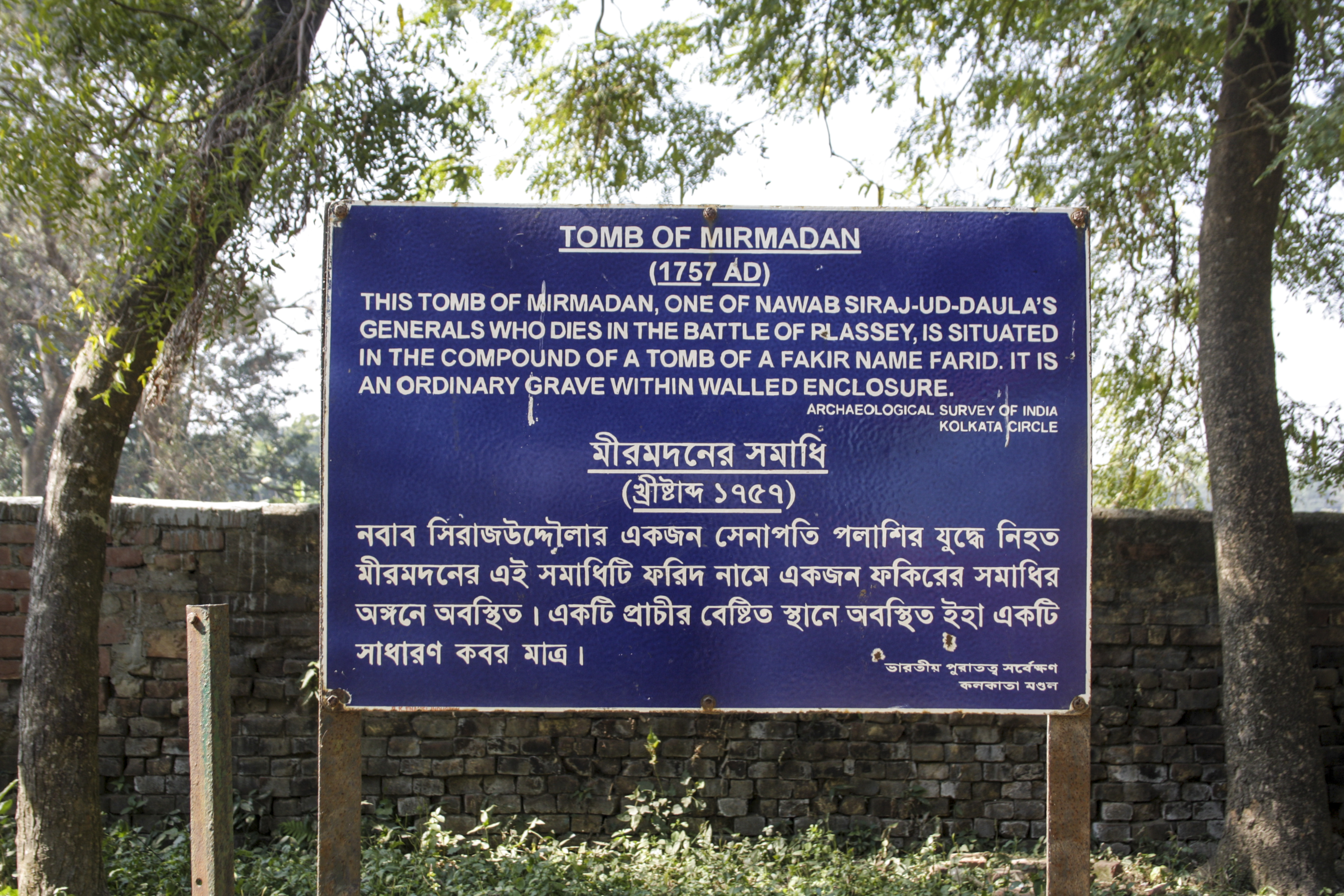
ASI board
