= St. Mary's Park, Northumberland =

Coordinates: 55.1246°N 1.7174°W

St. Mary's Park
- Housing estate
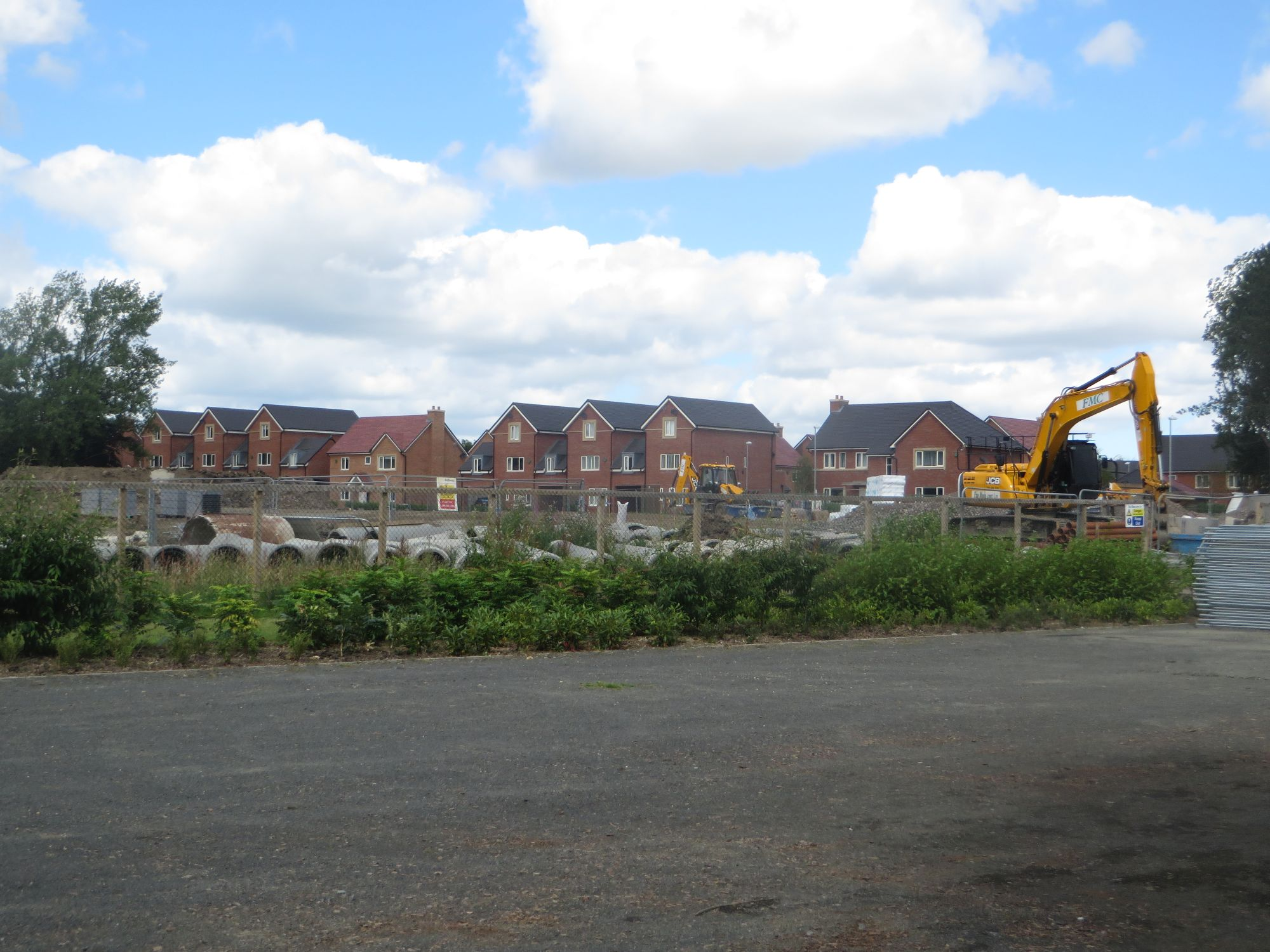
- Construction of houses at St. Mary's Park (2016)

- Location within Northumberland
- OS grid reference: NZ180811
- Unitary authority: Northumberland
- Ceremonial county: Northumberland
- Region: North East
- Country: England
- Sovereign state: United Kingdom
- Post town: MORPETH
- Postcode district: NE61
- Dialling code: 01670
- Police: Northumbria
- Fire: Northumberland
- Ambulance: North East
- UK Parliament: Hexham

St Mary’s Park is a housing estate which is being developed in the civil parish of Stannington near Morpeth, Northumberland, England. It is located about 2 miles (3 km) west of Stannington and 4 miles (6 km) south of Morpeth, and was the location of St Mary's Hospital, a former psychiatric hospital. The hospital was built at the beginning of the 20th century as the county asylum for Northumberland, housed up to 2000 patients at one time, and closed in 1996. Most of the hospital buildings have been demolished since in favour of new-built houses, but in the Edwardian administration block of the former hospital, a gastropub with bed and breakfast accommodation has been established under the name of St. Mary's Inn.
