= Lower Panzara Dam =

Akkalpada Dam
- Location within Maharashtra
- Official name: Lower Panzara (Akkalpada) Dam D03103
- Location: Sakri
- Coordinates: 20.9421621°N 74.4530797°E
- Demolition date: N/A
- Owners: Government of Maharashtra, India

Dam and spillways
- Type of dam: Earthfill
- Impounds: Panzara river
- Height: 33.28 m (109.2 ft)
- Length: 706 m (2,316 ft)
- Dam volume: 1,114 km^{3} (267 cu mi)

Reservoir
- Total capacity: 36,990 km^{3} (8,870 cu mi)
- Surface area: 6.28 km^{2} (2.42 sq mi)

Lower Panzara Dam, also known as Akkalpada Dam, is an earthfill dam on Panzara river near Akkalpada (Sakri) in Dhule district in Maharashtra, India.

== Specifications ==
The height of the dam above lowest foundation is 33.28 m (109.2 ft) while the length is 706 m (2,316 ft). The volume content is 1,114 km^{3} (267 cu mi) and gross storage capacity is 39,750 thousand cum (39.75 million cum) and effective storage is 36,990 thousand cum (36.99 million cum).

== Purpose ==
- Irrigation

== See also ==
- Dams in Maharashtra
- List of reservoirs and dams in India
