= Plessey (disambiguation) =

Plessey was a British electronics company.

It can also refer to:

- Plessey Code, a British barcode system
- Plessey System 250, a computer system that implements capability based addressing
- Plessey railway station, a disused halt near Plessey village, in Northumberland
- Plessey Woods Country Park, near Plessey village, in Northumberland

== See also ==
- Plessey v Ferguson
- Pleshey
- Plassey (disambiguation)
