= Mudawad =

Village in Maharashtra

Mudãwad Kapileshwar
- village
- Location in Maharashtra, India Mudãwad (India)
- Coordinates: 21.223962°N 74.939075°E
- Country: India
- State: Maharashtra
- District: Dhule

Area
  - Total: 2 km^{2} (0.77 sq mi)

Population
  - Total: 2,208
  - Density: 1,100/km^{2} (2,900/sq mi)

Languages
  - Official: Marathi
- Time zone: UTC+5:30 (IST)
- Postal code: 425403

Mudawad is a small village in Shindkheda tehsil of Dhule district in Maharashtra, India. It is situated on the confluence of the Tapti and Panzara rivers. The temple of Kapileshwar on the confluence was constructed in the 17th century by Ahilyabai Holkar of Indore.

== Gallery ==
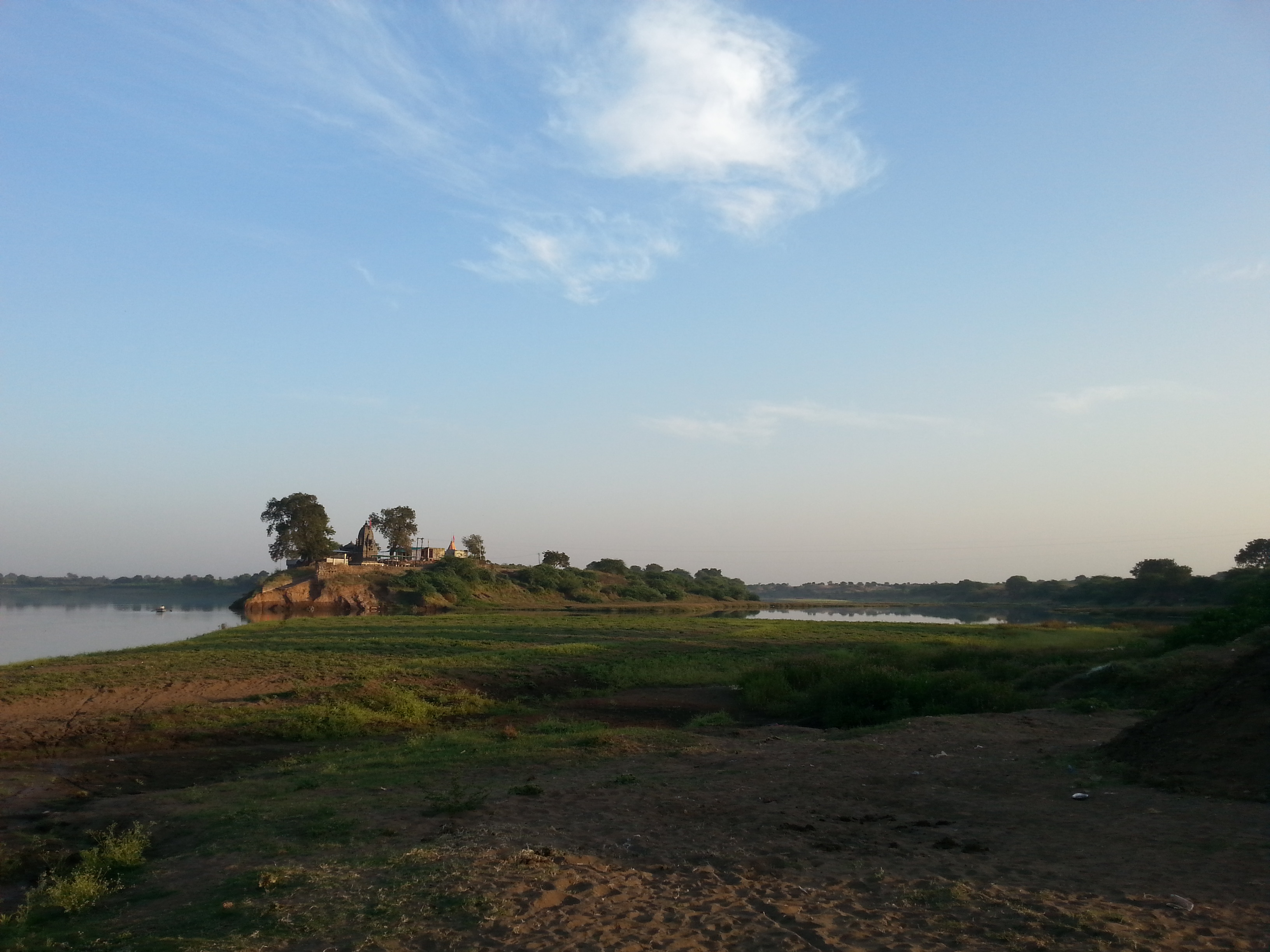
Banks of Tapti with temple

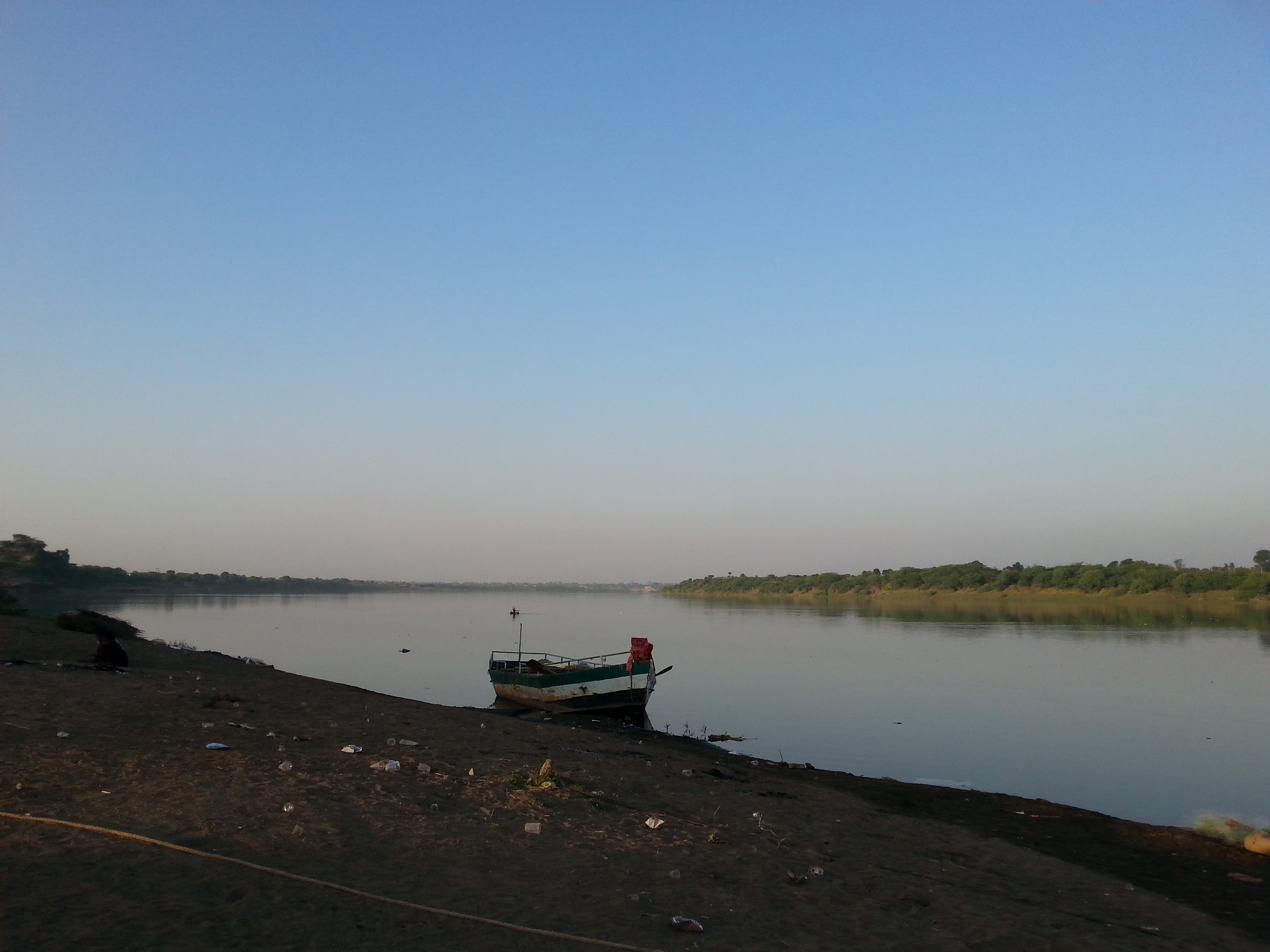
Tapti river

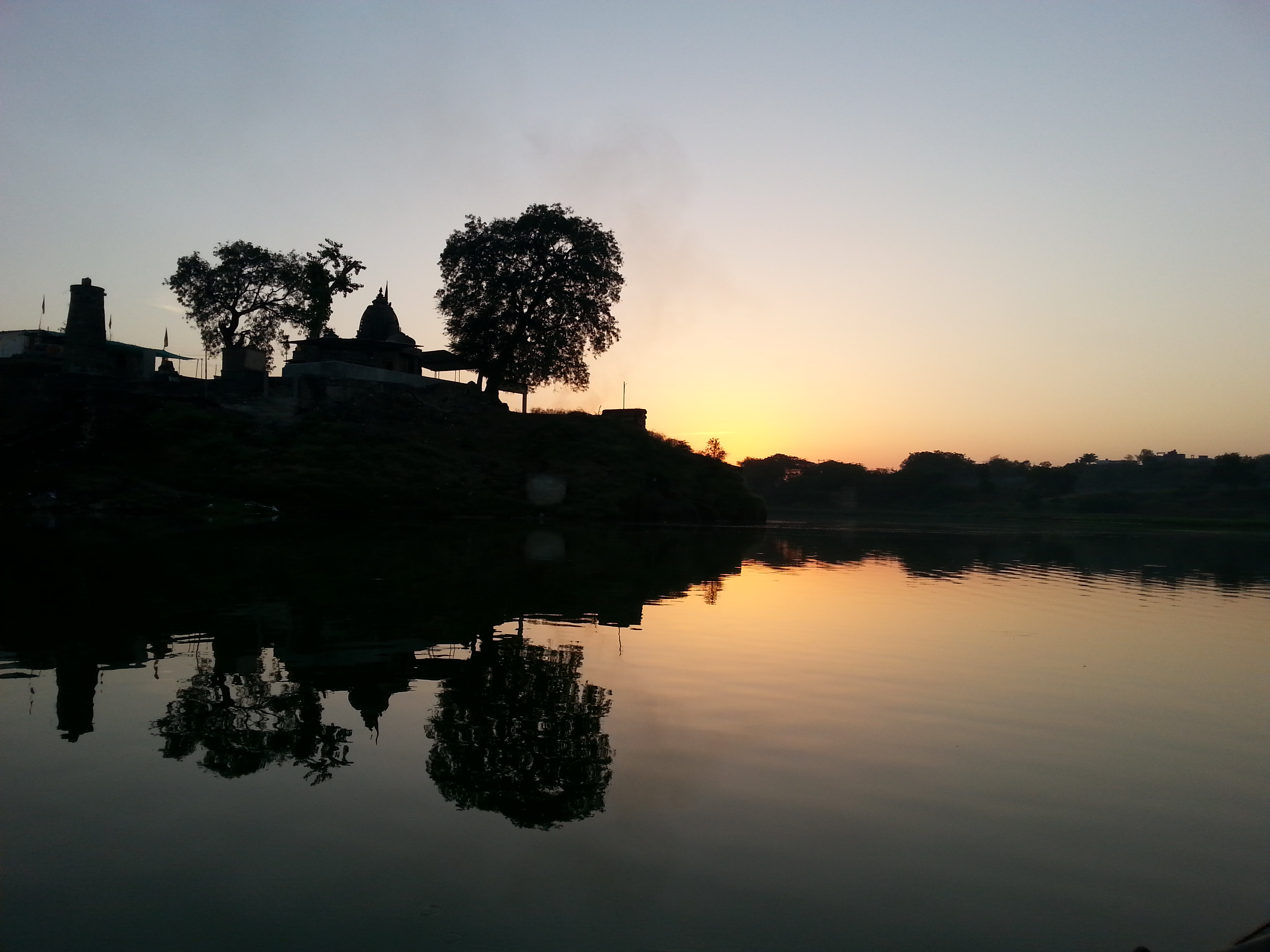
Temple of Kapileshwar
