= Mir Madan =

Chief of the artillery of Nawab Siraj Ud Dowla

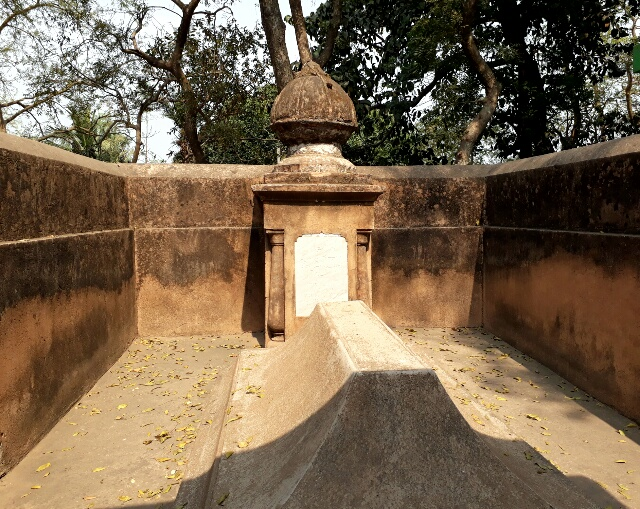
- Tomb of Mir Madan
- Died: 23 June 1757; Palashi
- Buried: Farid Khan's Dargah, Faridpur, Murshidabad District, India

Mir Madan (died 23 June 1757) was one of the most trusted officers and chief of the artillery of Nawab Siraj Ud Dowla of the Bengal Subah. He died in the Battle of Plassey.

== Early life ==
At first, Mir Madan worked in Jahangirnagar under Hossain Kuli Khan's nephew, Hasan-Uddin Khan. Nawab Alivardi Khan preferred him due to his good performance, trustworthiness, and brought him in Murshidabad. Here, he got the title of 'Bakshi' (Paymaster of the army). Subsequently, he occupied the post of Chief Artillery in Nawab Siraj-Ud-Doula's army.

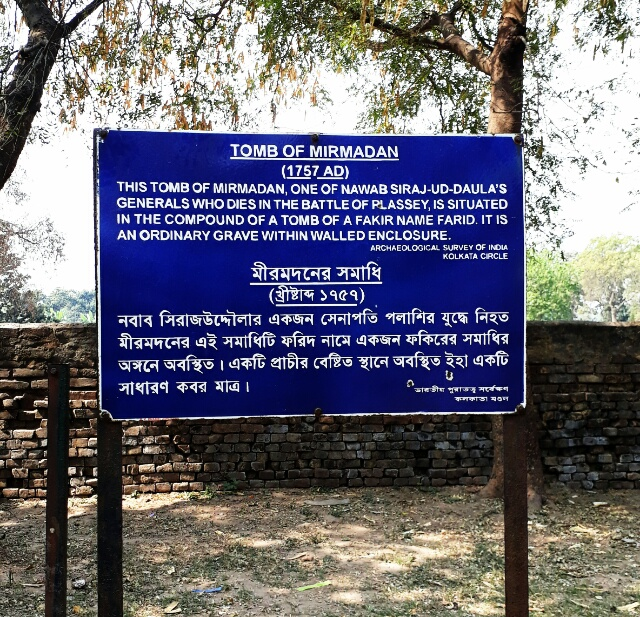
ASI display board of Tomb of Mir Madan

== Death ==
On 23 June 1757, in the infamous Battle of Plassey, Mir Madan and Diwan Mohanlal fought for the Nawab whereas Commander-in-chief Mir Jafar and others remained standstill. In fact, Madan's troop caused a serious pressure on the force of the East India Company. At 2 pm on that day, he was mortally wounded by a British cannonball and died. His two fellow fighters, Nawe Singh Hajari and Bahadur Khan, also died.

== Tomb ==
Some cadres of his troop buried him secretly in what is now called the Tomb of Mir Madan in Faridpur village, Murshidabad district (P.S. Rejinagar) near the Palashi battlefield. This place is known as Farid Shah's Dargah (Mosque). At present, his tomb is under supervision of the Archaeological Survey of India.
