= Annitsford railway station =

Disused railway station in Dudley, North Tyneside

Coordinates: 55.057°N 1.598°W

Annitsford

General information
- Location: Dudley, North Tyneside; England
- Platforms: 2

Other information
- Status: Disused

History
- Original company: North Eastern Railway
- Pre-grouping: North Eastern Railway
- Post-grouping: London and North Eastern Railway

Key dates
- April 1860: first station opens as Dudley
- 1 Sept 1874: renamed Dudley Colliery
- April 1878: renamed Annitsford
- 8 July 1878: station resited
- 15 September 1958: Station closed for passengers
- 11 November 1963: closed for goods
Location

The first station in the area opened in 1860 as Dudley and served Dudley Colliery and the village of Dudley in North Tyneside, England. It was located on the East Coast Main Line to the north of Newcastle upon Tyne. In 1874 it was renamed Dudley Colliery before becoming Annitsford in April 1878. On 8 July 1878 the station was closed and replaced with a second station 352 yards south of the first station. The railway station was located in Dudley but was named after the nearby village of Annitsford, to avoid confusion with another Dudley in the Midlands.

== History ==
Opened by the North Eastern Railway, it became part of the London and North Eastern Railway during the Grouping of 1923. The line then passed on to the Eastern Region of British Railways on nationalisation in 1948.

The station was then closed by the British Transport Commission.

== The site today ==
Trains still pass on the now electrified East Coast Main Line.

Preceding station	Historical railways	Following station
Killingworth; Line open, station closed	North Eastern Railway; York, Newcastle and Berwick Railway	Cramlington; Line and station open
