= Rui Chatrapati Dam =

- Location within Maharashtra
- Official name: Rui Chatrapati Dam
- Location: Rui Chatrapati, Parner; India
- Coordinates: 18°55′37″N 74°33′42″E
- Opening date: 1980
- Owners: Government of Maharashtra, India

Dam and spillways
- Type of dam: Earth-fill (Earthen)
- Impounds: Gopal Ganga River
- Height: 10.77 m (35.3 ft)
- Length: 420 m (1,380 ft)

Reservoir
- Creates: Rui Chatrapati lake
- Total capacity: 1,070 km^{3} (260 cu mi)
- Surface area: 46 km^{2} (18 sq mi)

Rui Chatrapati Dam (Marathi: रुई छत्रपती धरण), is an earth-fill dam on Gopal Ganga river in Rui Chatrapati village in Parner taluka of Ahmednagar district of state of Maharashtra in India.

== Specifications ==
The height of the dam above lowest foundation is 10.77 m (35.3 ft) while the length is 420 m (1,380 ft). The gross storage capacity is 1,350 km^{3} (320 cu mi).

== Purpose ==
- Irrigation
- Drinking water for neatest villages

== See also ==
- Dams in Maharashtra
