= Killingworth railway station =

Disused railway station in Killingworth, North Tyneside

Killingworth

General information
- Location: Killingworth, North Tyneside; England
- Coordinates: 55.032°N 1.5822°W
- Grid reference: NZ268709
- Platforms: 2

Other information
- Status: Disused

History
- Original company: York, Newcastle and Berwick Railway
- Pre-grouping: North Eastern Railway
- Post-grouping: LNER; British Rail (North Eastern)

Key dates
- 29 March 1847: Opened
- 15 September 1958: Closed to passengers
- 7 June 1965: Closed completely
Location

Killingworth railway station served the town of Killingworth, Tyne and Wear, England from 1847 to 1965 on the East Coast Main Line.

== History ==
The station opened on 29 March 1847 by the York, Newcastle and Berwick Railway. The station was situated south of the level crossing on Killingworth Drive on the B1505. The location of the station was not convenient for the Killingworth village because it was one mile (1.6 km) away but it gained a new source of passengers when the Newcastle races were transferred from Town Moor to Gosforth Park. To cope with the additional traffic a separate island platform was opened from 1896 until 1959 served by trains on race meetings days only. From June 1954 the station was closed on Sunday and by summer 1958 there was only one train called in each direction on Monday to Friday, although there were two on Saturday. The station was one of ten to close on 15 September 1958 and closed completely on 7 June 1965 when goods traffic ceased.

Preceding station	Historical railways	Following station
Forest Hall; Line open, station closed	North Eastern Railway; York, Newcastle and Berwick Railway	Annitsford; Line open, station closed
