= Karjule Hareshwar =

Village in Maharashtra

- village
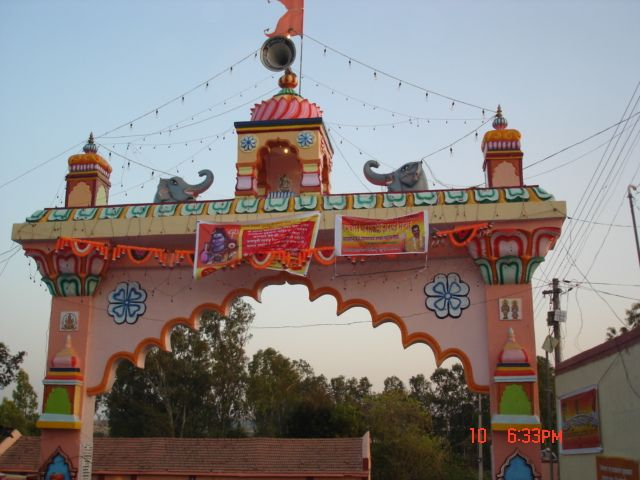
- Main entry gate of Karjule Hareshwar
- Nickname: Karjule
- Location in Maharashtra, India Karjule Hareshwar (India)
- Coordinates: 19°10′01″N 74°19′24″E
- Country: India
- State: Maharashtra
- District: Ahmednagar
- Taluka: Parner

Government
  - Body: Village panchayat

Population (2001)
  - Total: 1,031

Languages
  - Official: Marathi
- Time zone: UTC+5:30 (IST)
- PIN: 414304
- Telephone code: 02488
- Vehicle registration: MH-16, MH-17
- Lok Sabha constituency: Ahmednagar
- Vidhan Sabha constituency: Parner

Karjule Hareshwar formerly called Karjule Harya is a village in Ahmednagar district of Maharashtra, India, on Kalyan Ahmednagar highway National Highway 222. It is located 50 km towards west from District headquarters Ahmednagar, 25 km from Parner and 181 km from State capital Mumbai.

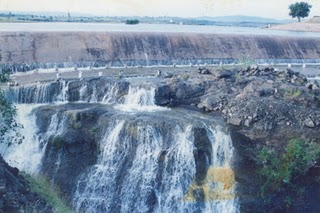
Mandohol Dam in Karjule Hareshwar

== Mandohol Dam ==
Mandohol Dam was constructed on the Mandohol river between 1977 and 1983.

== See also ==
- Marathi Wikipedia Article
- Mandohol Dam
- Takali Dhokeshwar
- Parner
- Waphare Wadi
