= Dudley, Tyne and Wear =

Village in Tyne and Wear, England

Coordinates: 55.059829°N 1.5924150°W

Dudley
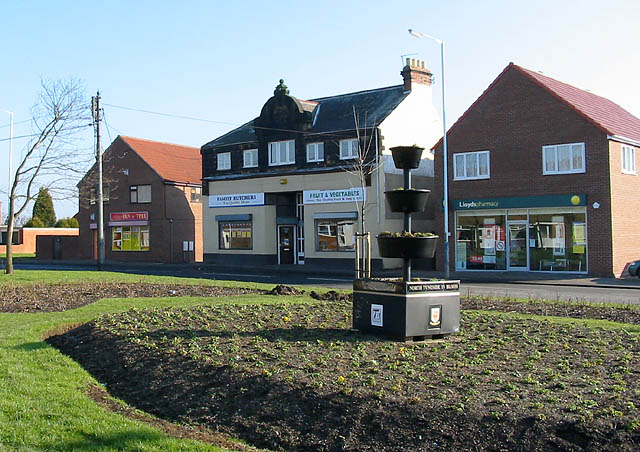

- Location within Tyne and Wear
- Metropolitan borough: North Tyneside
- Metropolitan county: Tyne and Wear
- Region: North East
- Country: England
- Sovereign state: United Kingdom
- Post town: CRAMLINGTON
- Postcode district: NE23

Dudley is a large village in North Tyneside, in the county of Tyne and Wear, England and situated at Northumberland's border. A former mining village and formerly part of Northumberland, it was the site of Annitsford railway station, originally named Dudley. Dudley Colliery was situated in the village from 1856 until its closure in 1977.

Former professional football player and coach Bobby Ferguson was born in the village.

Robson Green, an English actor, angler, singer-songwriter and presenter, is from the village and grew up there.
