= Stannington railway station =

Disused railway station in Northumberland, England

Stannington
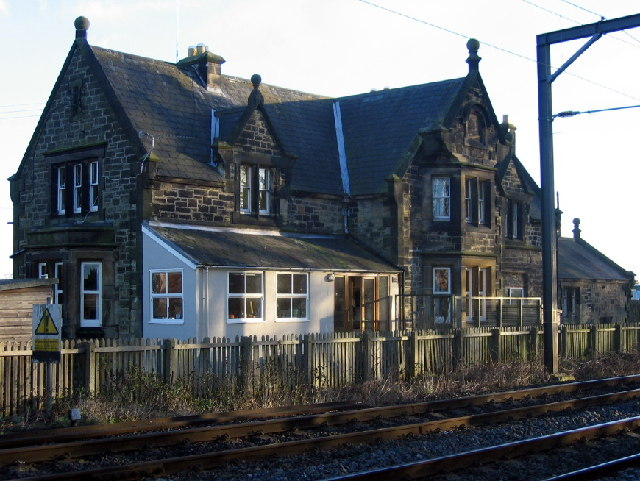
- Stannington station house

General information
- Location: Stannington, Northumberland; England
- Coordinates: 55.1277°N 1.6606°W
- Platforms: 2

Other information
- Status: Disused

History
- Original company: Newcastle and Berwick Railway
- Pre-grouping: North Eastern Railway
- Post-grouping: London and North Eastern Railway; North Eastern Region of British Railways

Key dates
- 1 March 1847: Station opens as Netherton
- 1 January 1892: renamed Stannington
- 15 September 1958: Closed to passengers
- August 1964: closed for goods
Location

Stannington railway station was a railway station which served the village of Stannington in Northumberland, England. It was located on the East Coast Main Line. It was opened in 1847 as Netherton, and closed in 1958. The community around the location of the station is today known as Stannington Station.

== History ==
The station was opened on 1 March 1847. It was located on the Newcastle and Berwick Railway between Morpeth and Cramlington. It was initially named Netherton, but was renamed to Stannington on 1 January 1892. The station buildings were designed by Benjamin Green.

The station remained open until 15 September 1958, when it was closed to passengers. Goods services to the site continued for another six years but were withdrawn in August 1964.

== The site today ==
The site of the station is now an important level crossing over the present East Coast Main Line. The station house, a four-bedroomed property, is still in existence having been converted to residential use, although it has been substantially altered.

The station was located some distance from the village of Stannington, and a community grew up around the site which took the name of the station. The name Stannington Station is still used to refer to the area, which is located on the trunk A1 road and the smaller A192 road.

Housing development near to Stannington has led to suggestions that the station could be reopened. In 2004 the South East Northumberland Rail User Group listed Stannington's reopening amongst its aims; however, as of April 2015, no mention of Stannington is made on the group's website.

Preceding station	Historical railways	Following station
Plessey; Line open, station closed	North Eastern Railway; York, Newcastle and Berwick Railway	Morpeth; Line and station open
