= Kasare, Parner =

Village in Maharashtra

Kasare
- village
- Location in Maharashtra, India Kasare (India)
- Coordinates: 19°08′24″N 74°20′11″E
- Country: India
- State: Maharashtra
- District: Ahmadnagar
- Taluka: Parner

Government
  - Body: Village panchayat

Population (2011)
  - Total: 1,053

Languages
  - Official: Marathi
- Time zone: UTC+5:30 (IST)
- PIN: 414 304
- Telephone code: 022488
- ISO 3166 code: IN-MH
- Vehicle registration: MH-16, MH-17
- Lok Sabha constituency: Ahmednagar
- Vidhan Sabha constituency: Parner
- Nearest town: Takali Dhokeshwar
- Website: maharashtra.gov.in

Kasare, is a small village in Ahmednagar district of Maharashtra, India. This village is located near Takli Dhokeshwar.

== Demographics ==
In the 2001 census, the village of Kasare had 1,086 inhabitants, with 518 males (47.7%) and 568 females (52.3%), for a gender ratio of 1097 females per thousand males.

In the 2011 census, the village of Kasare had 1,053 inhabitants, for a net loss of 33 over the preceding decade.

== Education ==
=== Schools ===
- Jilha Parishad Prathamik School

Provides education from 1st standard to 7th standard

== Religion ==
The majority of the population in Kasare is Hindu. There are several temples in the village.

=== Temples ===
- Shree Biroba Temple
- Shree Mahadev Temple

== See also ==
- Karjule Hareshwar
- Takali Dhokeshwar
- Parner
