= Hanga Dam =

- Location within Maharashtra
- Official name: Hanga Dam
- Location: Hanga, Parner; India
- Coordinates: 18°59′33″N 74°28′54″E
- Opening date: 1978
- Owners: Government of Maharashtra, India

Dam and spillways
- Type of dam: Earth-fill (Earthen)
- Impounds: Hanga River
- Height: 15.84 m (52.0 ft)
- Length: 390 m (1,280 ft)

Reservoir
- Creates: Hanga lake
- Total capacity: 1,340 km^{3} (320 cu mi)
- Surface area: 500 km^{2} (190 sq mi)

Hanga Dam (Marathi: हंगा धरण), is an earth-fill dam on Hanga river in Hanga village in Parner taluka of Ahmednagar district of state of Maharashtra in India.

== Specifications ==
The height of the dam above lowest foundation is 15.84 m (52.0 ft) while the length is 390 m (1,280 ft). The gross storage capacity is 1,850 km^{3} (440 cu mi).

== Purpose ==
- Irrigation
- Drinking water for neatest villages

== See also ==
- Dams in Maharashtra
