= Palashi Monument =

Monument in West Bengal, India

Coordinates: 23.795064551°N 88.2488519577°E

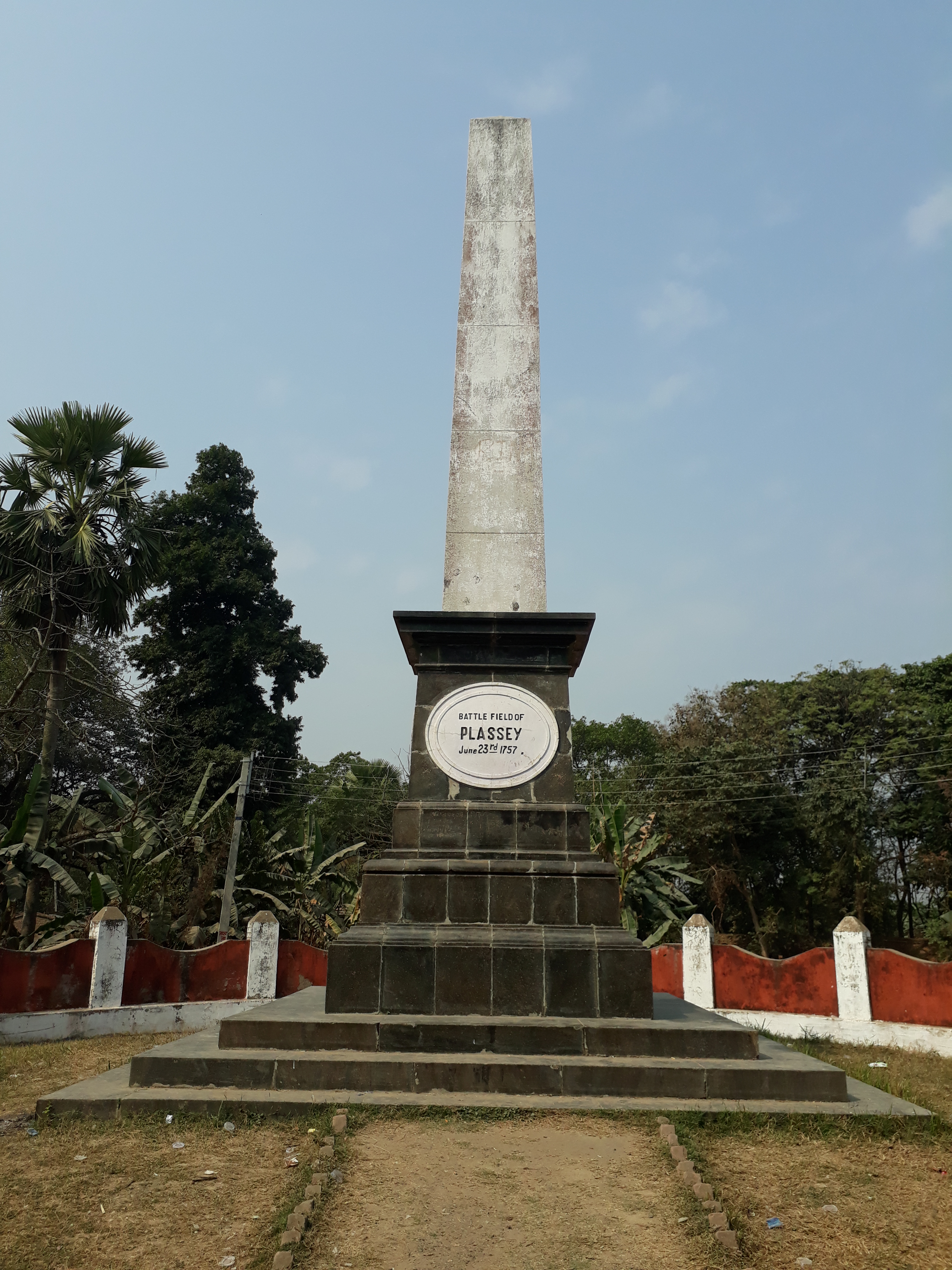
Plassey Monument

Palashi Monument is a monument at Palashi (Plassey), Nadia district, in the state of West Bengal. This was erected in memory of the Battle of Plassey fought between Sir Robert Clive, commander of the British East India Company and Nawab Siraj ud-Daulah on 23 June 1757. Initially this victory memorial was stoned here in 1883, which was rebuilt later at the period of Lord Curzon. The monument is under preservation of Archaeological Survey of India. In 2007, on the 250th anniversary of the battle, a statue of Siraj ud-Daulah was established by All India Forward Bloc leader Debabrata Biswas on behalf of India-Pakistan-Bangladesh People's Forum.

== Location ==
The monument was established in the bank of the Bhagirathi River and beside Plassey Sugar Mill, which is popularly known as Plassey Battlefield. But the actual battlefield has been partially washed away by a shift of the river. The place is located from almost 150 km from Kolkata and 7 km from the Plassey railway station.
