= Lonimavla Dam =

- Location within Maharashtra
- Official name: Lonimavla Dam
- Location: Lonimawala, Parner; India
- Coordinates: 19°0′40″N 74°19′24″E
- Opening date: 1981
- Owners: Government of Maharashtra, India

Dam and spillways
- Type of dam: Earth-fill (Earthen)
- Impounds: Local Nallah River
- Height: 10 m (33 ft)
- Length: 958 m (3,143 ft)

Reservoir
- Creates: Lonimavla lake
- Total capacity: 880 km^{3} (210 cu mi)
- Surface area: 46 km^{2} (18 sq mi)

Lonimavla Dam (Marathi: लोणीमावळा धरण), is an earth-fill dam in Lonimawala village in Parner taluka of Ahmednagar district of state of Maharashtra in India.

== Specifications ==
The height of the dam above lowest foundation is 10 m (33 ft) while the length is 958 m (3,143 ft). The gross storage capacity is 1,080 km^{3} (260 cu mi).

== Purpose ==
- Irrigation
- Drinking water for neatest villages

== See also ==
- Dams in Maharashtra
