= Nijampur Dhule =

Village in Maharashtra

Nijampur Dhule Nijampur-Jaitane
- village
- Location in Maharashtra, India Nijampur Dhule (India)
- Coordinates: 21°06′42″N 74°19′48″E
- Country: India
- State: Maharashtra
- District: Dhule
- Talukas: Sakri

Area
  - Total: 3.04 km^{2} (1.17 sq mi)

Population
  - Total: 49,004
  - Density: 16,100/km^{2} (41,700/sq mi)

Languages
  - Official: Marathi
- Time zone: UTC+5:30 (IST)
- PIN: 424305
- Vehicle registration: MH 18

Nijampur-Jaitane, about 16 km (9.9 mi) north-east of Pimpalner, is a small village in Sakri Tehsil in Dhule District of Maharashtra state in India.

== Location ==
Nijampur-Jaitane is located about 19 km north of Sakri. Maharashtra State Highway 17 passes near the village, and Nijampur lies on the Nandurbar–Sakri State Highway. The village falls under Sakri taluka of Dhule district.

== History ==
It is believed that the village derived its present name from Nizam-ul-Mulk, who is said to have halted there for some time. In the early 17th century (1610), Nijampur-Jaitane was described as the first major settlement between Surat and Agra and was inhabited by several wealthy moneylenders.

Fragments of Hemadpanti temples found throughout the village suggest that the settlement may have held regional importance prior to the arrival of Muslim rule.

== Tourism ==
The village has a few temples dedicated to various deities but those dedicated to Vitthal Rakhumai, Lord Balaji, Parasnath, Peshve kalin Ganpati Mandir and Gupteshvar are the only ones of any note.

Peshve kalin Ganesh Temple

This temple was established in the 18th century. People strongly believe that if we wish in front of Lord Ganesha, it will become true.

Balaji temple

The idol in the Balaji temple has a richly ornamented brass Prabhaval of excellent design. The temple is said to have been built in 1769. It is a two stored building. Looked after by the Buwa family for 8 generations.

Parshvanath Jain Temple

Tire antique shrine of Parasnath, the 23rd Jain tirthankar, now devoid of the idol, is a structure of stone and cement of 22.86 by 17.98 meters (75.0 ft × 59.0 ft) dimensions.

Gupteshvar temple

Gupteshvar shrine it is said that it was uncovered from the ground when a certain resident of Nijampur-Jaitane dreamt of its existence.

Gopalpura temple

Gopalpura is located near Maruti Temple. The place is very pleasant surrounded by various flower trees. Samadhi of Swami Nityanand is located inside the Gopalpura campus.

The village has also an old gadhi, now in utter ruins, and a spring called Sakharjira whose waters are palatable. The village of nizampur is near to the India biggest project "Suzlon private limited" &"Solar city project". Outside 3 km on Nijampur-Jaitane has very popular "Mhasai mata temple". Some people originally belonging to this place have surnames such as Nijampure, Nijampurkar (belonging to Nijampur) There is a temple of Shree Sant Savta Maharaj which is built in 2010.

== Economy ==
Most of the economy is agriculture related. Vegetables grown in the village are sold in the markets of Surat, Nasik and Mumbai. Crops such as Millet, Chilli, onion, Groundnuts, sugarcane, Gram, cotton, wheat, jowar, etc. are also grown.

== Education ==
Nijampur-Jaitane has several educational institutions, including government and private schools that provide primary and secondary education. The village also has a junior college serving students from the village and nearby areas.

== Administration ==
Nijampur has as Village Gram Panchayat for day-to-day administration. The District Zilla Panchayat headquarters is at Dhule and the Block Panchayat is also at Dhule.

Nijampur has Some commercial banks like SBI, co-operative banks like The Hasti co-operative bank ltd, agricultural credit societies, non-agricultural credit societies or other credit societies present within the village.

== See also ==
- Dhule City
- Dhule District
- List of districts of Maharashtra
- Khandesh
