= Panzara River =

River in Maharashtra, India

Coordinates: 20°54′27.5″N 74°46′34.8″E

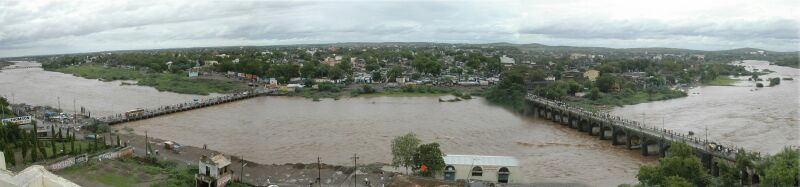
Panzara River on a cloudy monsoon day. The photo was taken from the Dhule city side, on the other bank is Deopur, a suburb of Dhule. Chhota Pul or small bridge is seen on the left, and Motha Pul or big bridge on the right.

The Panzara-Kan or Panjhra is a river in the Khandesh region of the Maharashtra state of India. It is a tributary of the Tapi River. The Panjhra River originates just few kilometers from the small town of Pimpalner Tal - Sakri in Dhule District.

Akkalpada Dam is built on Panzara River in Sakri Taluka

At its headwaters is a small reservoir which was created when the Latipada Dam was constructed.
