= Hanga =

Village in Maharashtra

- Village
- Location in Maharashtra, India Hanga (India)
- Coordinates: 18.979391°N 74.500773°E
- Country: India
- State: Maharashtra
- District: Ahmadnagar

Languages
  - Official: Marathi
- Time zone: UTC+5:30 (IST)
- Telephone code: 022488
- Vehicle registration: MH-16,17
- Lok Sabha constituency: Ahmednagar
- Vidhan Sabha constituency: Parner

Hanga is a village in Parner taluka in Ahmednagar district of the state of Maharashtra.

== Temple ==
Hanga has a popular temple of Shiva popularly called as a Hangeshwar. It is situated at the bank of Hanga river. It is believed that in the month of August (Shraavana), every Monday inside the Hangeshwar temple, round shape pindis of rice takes shape automatically.

== Religion ==
The Indian dialect used by the majority of the population in the village is Hindu, or Hinduian; Hindu is the short version of the word.

== Economy ==
The majority of the population has farming as their primary occupation.
