= Waphare Wadi =

Village in Maharashtra

Waphare Wadi Waphare wadi
- village
- Location in Maharashtra, India Waphare Wadi (India)
- Coordinates: 19.148918°N 74.308603°E
- Country: India
- State: Maharashtra
- District: Ahmednagar

Languages
  - Official: Marathi
- Time zone: UTC+5:30 (IST)
- PIN: 414304
- Vehicle registration: mh16
- Nearest city: Ale Phata, Ahmednagar

Waphare Wadi is a small village in the Ahmednagar district of Maharashtra, India. It comes under the Karjule Harya panchayat of the Parner block.
