= Rui Chatrapati =

Village in Maharashtra

Rui Chatrapati Rui Chattrapati
- Village
- Interactive map of Rui Chatrapati
- Country: India
- State: Maharashtra
- District: Ahmadnagar

Government
  - Type: Panchayati raj (India)
  - Body: Gram panchayat

Languages
  - Official: Marathi
- Time zone: UTC+5:30 (IST)
- Telephone code: 022488
- ISO 3166 code: IN-MH
- Vehicle registration: MH-16,17
- Lok Sabha constituency: Ahmednagar
- Vidhan Sabha constituency: Parner
- Website: maharashtra.gov.in

Rui Chatrapati is a village in Parner taluka in Ahmednagar district of state of Maharashtra, India.

== Religion ==
The majority of the population in the village is Hindu. There is an old Peshwa time temple of Lord Shiva on the banks of the River Hanga. There are people from various Castes like Mali and Maratha's. The common surnames include Belhekar, Divate, Shinde, Gaikwad, Karape, Baravkar, Mehetre, Sable, Nagare, Bhujbal. There is a very good school Shri Dnyaneshwar Vidyalaya. Famous temple Aadishakti Tulja Bhavani Mata Mandir at Rui-chhatrapatikar dam.

== Economy ==
The majority of the population has farming as their primary occupation. Now Milk Dairy has also become one of the major employers.

== See also ==
- Parner taluka
- Villages in Parner taluka
