= Tikhol Dam =

- Location within Maharashtra
- Official name: Tikhol Dam
- Location: Tikhol, Parner; India
- Coordinates: 19°8′31″N 74°25′28″E
- Opening date: 1975
- Owners: Government of Maharashtra, India

Dam and spillways
- Type of dam: Earth-fill (Earthen)
- Impounds: Kalu River
- Height: 18.53 m (60.8 ft)
- Length: 360 m (1,180 ft)

Reservoir
- Creates: Tikhol lake
- Total capacity: 1,700 km^{3} (410 cu mi)
- Surface area: 64 km^{2} (25 sq mi)

Tikhol Dam (Marathi: तिखोल धरण) is an earth-fill dam on Kalu river in Tikhol village in Parner taluka of Ahmednagar district of state of Maharashtra in India.

== Specifications ==
The height of the dam above lowest foundation is 18.53 m (60.8 ft) while the length is 360 m (1,180 ft). The gross storage capacity is 2,430 km^{3} (580 cu mi).

== Purpose ==
- Irrigation
- Drinking water for neatest villages

== See also ==
- Dams in Maharashtra
