= St Mary's Hospital, Stannington =

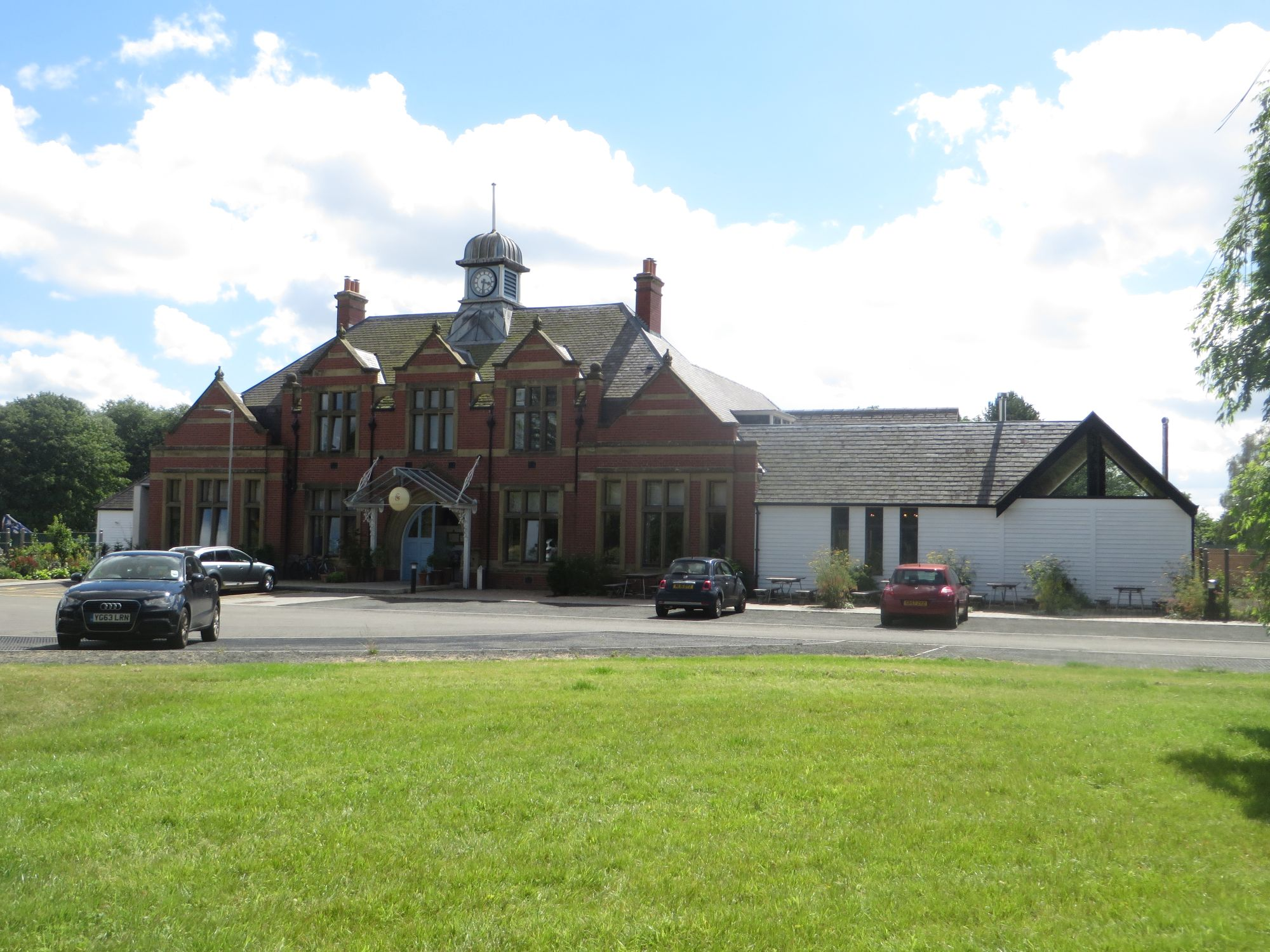
- The administration block of the hospital

- Shown in Northumberland

Geography
- Location: Stannington, Northumberland, England, United Kingdom
- Coordinates: 55.123°N 1.716°W

Organisation
- Care system: Public NHS
- Type: Specialist

Services
- Beds: 500
- Speciality: Mental Health

History
- Founded: 1914
- Closed: 1995
- Demolished: 2015

Links
- Lists: Hospitals in England

St Mary's Hospital was a mental health facility near Stannington, Northumberland, England. It was opened in 1910 and closed permanently in 1995. It was finally demolished in 2015.

== History ==
The facility was designed by George Thomas Hine in an echelon formation. Construction started in 1910 and it opened as the Gateshead Borough Lunatic Asylum in 1914. The hospital was requisitioned for military use during the First World War and then became Gateshead County Borough Mental Hospital in 1920. A nurses' home was completed in 1928, as well as various other additions to the site. Part of the hospital was also requisitioned for military use during the Second World War. The hospital joined the National Health Service in 1948.

After services transferred to Bensham General Hospital, the hospital closed in 1995. Most of the hospital was demolished in 2015 to make way for housing. However, some buildings remain in varying forms, including 34 former staff houses known locally as The Villas, as well as the former gate-keeping lodge, Chief Medical Superintendent's Home and the Administration block, now known as St Mary's Inn.
