= Stannington Sanatorium =

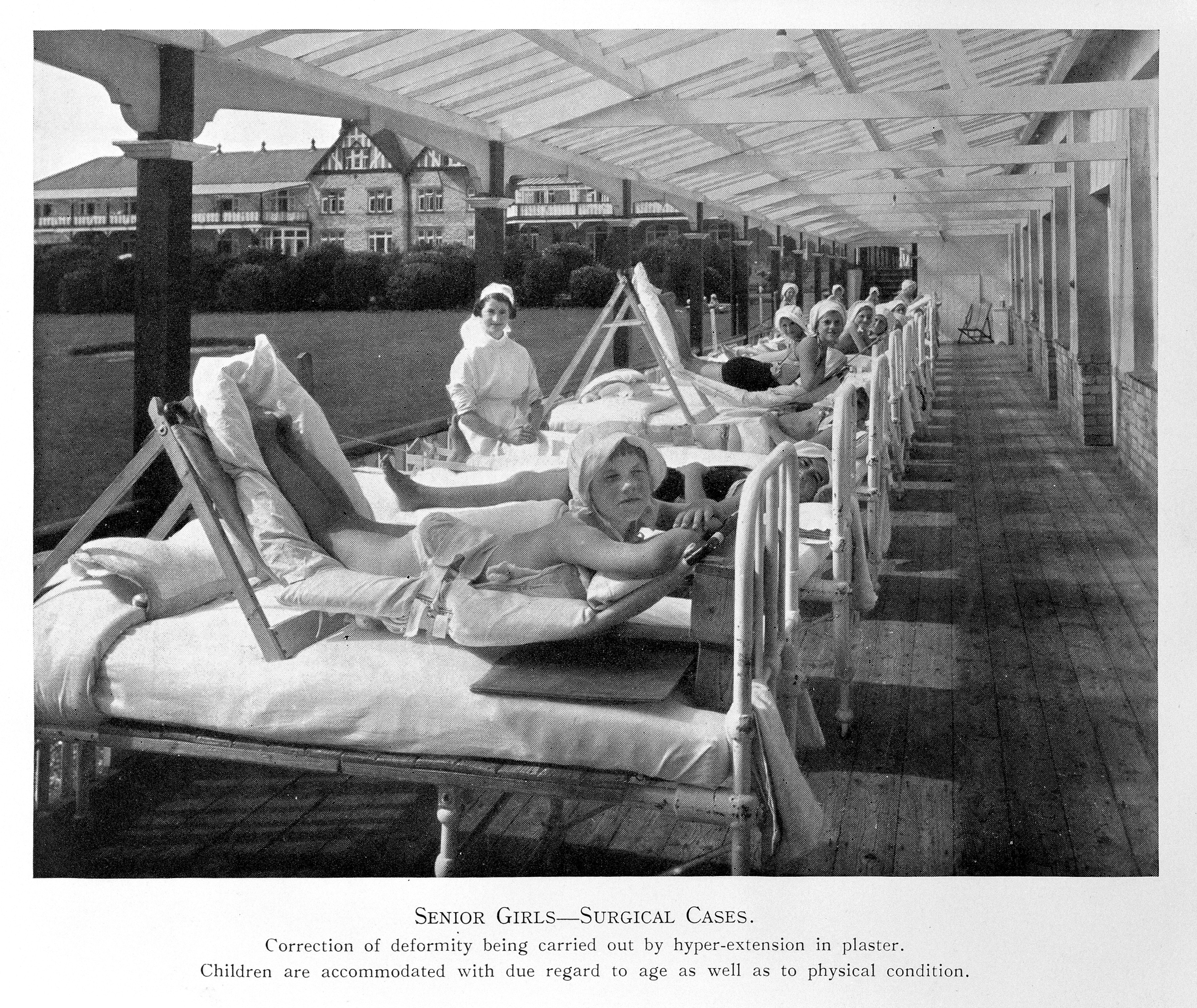
- Stannington Sanatorium

- Shown in Northumberland

Geography
- Location: Stannington, Northumberland, England, United Kingdom
- Coordinates: 55.136°N 1.709°W

Organisation
- Care system: Public NHS
- Type: Specialist

Services
- Speciality: TB hospital for children

History
- Founded: 1907
- Closed: 1984

Links
- Lists: Hospitals in England

Stannington Sanatorium was the first purpose-built children's tuberculosis sanatorium in the UK which officially opened on 5 October 1907 near to the village of Stannington, Northumberland. The institution was established by a local charity, The Poor Children's Holiday Association (PCHA), which developed into the modern-day charity Children North East, and also took contributions from local Poor Law Guardians for the upkeep of patients.

== History ==
=== Background ===
Tuberculosis at the beginning of the twentieth century was one of the biggest killers in the UK, responsible for more deaths than any other disease. The disease had long been associated with poverty and poor living conditions and by establishing a dedicated institution the PCHA hoped to make a difference to the lives of thousands of disadvantaged children. The PCHA had been in operation since 1891 and had begun by taking poor children from Newcastle and Gateshead for day trips to the seaside at Tynemouth. Over time this developed into providing longer holidays to the countryside and also led to the establishment of other institutions for the training of street children. Stannington came about following the recognition of the huge problem of tuberculosis by the charity's Honorary Physician Dr T.M. Allison and the realisation that tuberculous children could not be accommodated at their other facilities owing to fears of the spread of infection.

=== Development ===
When the sanatorium first opened in 1907 it contained only 50 beds but high demand and generous donations soon saw it expand with many new wards and additional facilities added over the coming years. Stannington was the first TB sanatorium to open in the UK that was dedicated purely to the treatment of children. At this time, while national death rates from TB were still fairly high Stannington maintained comparatively low death rates. By 1928 the hospital had the capacity to treat 310 children and this was the maximum capacity the sanatorium was ever to reach.

The sanitorium witnessed a great number of important changes in the treatment of tuberculosis as well as significant social changes. For example, the introduction of Streptomycin in 1947 revolutionised treatment for some. The National Health Service took over the responsibility of the sanatorium in 1948 and it continued its work dedicated to the treatment of tuberculous children up until 1953 whereupon it became a general children's hospital. With the introduction of effective antibiotic treatments in 1947 and an array of other public health measures, tuberculosis had now begun to steadily decline, however, even after this date it continued to take in tuberculosis patients. It continued its operations as an NHS children's hospital until 1984 when it was closed completely. Many of the historic medical records were recovered when the hospital closed.

== Records ==
In August 2013 Northumberland Archives was awarded a Research Resources in Medical History Award of £77,717 from The Wellcome Trust to catalogue and part digitise records of Stannington Sanatorium. In the same year 120 linear feet of records of the Sanatorium were deposited with Northumberland Archives. The bulk of these records are patient records but included in the deposit were c.15,000 radiographic plates for the period 1937-1952. These records were fully digitised in 2015, with a series of pages with personal details redacted turned into a touring exhibition and published online in a virtual exhibition, which is still available to view. Northumberland Archives also wrote a series of blogs about the project, some of which look into the lives of the patients, the treatments, and activities at Stannington Sanatorium.
