= Mandohol Dam =

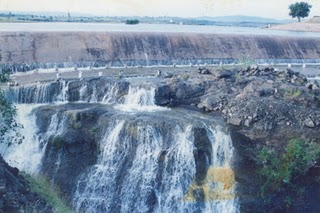
- Fully filled Mandohol Dam

- Location within Maharashtra
- Official name: Mandohol Dam
- Location: Karjule Hareshwar, Parner India
- Coordinates: 19°11′56″N 74°18′28″E
- Construction began: 1977
- Opening date: 1984
- Construction cost: ₹362 lakh (US$380,000)
- Owners: Government of Maharashtra, India
- Operators: Command Area Development Authority (CADA), Ahmednagar

Dam and spillways
- Type of dam: Earth-fill (Earthen)
- Impounds: Mandohol River
- Height: 27.07 m (88.8 ft)
- Length: 739.0 m (2,424.5 ft)
- Dam volume: 426 km^{3} (102 cu mi)

Reservoir
- Creates: Mandohol Lake
- Total capacity: 8,780 km^{3} (2,110 cu mi)
- Catchment area: 142.45 km^{2} (55.00 sq mi)
- Surface area: 199.51 km^{2} (77.03 sq mi)

Mandohol Dam (Marathi: मांडोहोळ धरण) is an earth-fill dam on Mandohol River in Karjule Hareshwar village of Parner taluka in Ahmednagar district of state of Maharashtra in India.

== Construction ==
The dam is constructed by Command Area Development Authority (CADA), Ahmednagar. It was constructed between 1977 and 1983, and was opened for irrigation purpose in 1984.

== Specifications ==
The height of the dam above lowest foundation is 27.07 m (88.8 ft) while the length is 739.0 m (2,424.5 ft). The volume content is 4.26 km^{3} (1.02 cu mi) and gross storage capacity is 11,300 km^{3} (2,700 cu mi).

== Purpose ==
- Irrigation
- Drinking water for neatest villages

== See also ==
- Dams in Maharashtra
