= St. Mary's Square =

St. Mary's Square may refer to:

- Mariatorget, in Södermalm, Stockholm, Sweden
- Prešeren Square, formerly St. Mary's Square, in Ljubljana, Slovenia
- Saint Mary's Square (San Francisco), San Francisco's Chinatown, United States
- St. Mary's Square, Swansea City Centre, Wales
