= Cramlington railway station =

Railway station in Northumberland, England

Cramlington
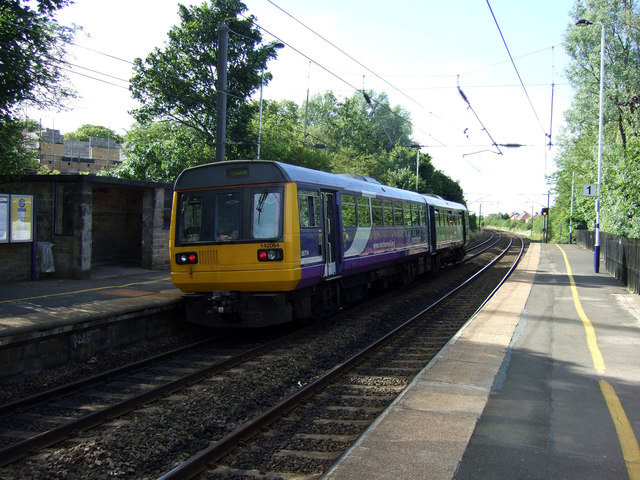

General information
- Location: Cramlington, Northumberland; England
- Coordinates: 55°05′16″N 1°35′55″W
- Grid reference: NZ257771
- Owner: Network Rail
- Manager: Northern Trains
- Platforms: 2

Other information
- Station code: CRM
- Classification: DfT category F2

History
- Original company: Newcastle and Berwick Railway
- Pre-grouping: North Eastern Railway
- Post-grouping: London and North Eastern Railway; British Rail (North Eastern Region)

Key dates
- 1 March 1847: Opened

Passengers
- 2020/21: ▼29,804
- 2021/22: ▲0.111 million
- 2022/23: ▲0.134 million
- 2023/24: ▼0.130 million
- 2024/25: ▲0.184 million
Location
- Location within Northumberland
Notes
- Passenger statistics from the Office of Rail and Road

Cramlington is a railway station on the East Coast Main Line, which runs between London King's Cross and Edinburgh Waverley. The station, situated 9 miles 74 chains (9.92 mi; 16.0 km) north of Newcastle, serves the town of Cramlington in Northumberland, England. It is owned by Network Rail and managed by Northern Trains.

== History ==
The station was opened by the Newcastle and Berwick Railway on 1 March 1847.

From November 2021 to May 2022, the footbridge was refurbished.

== Facilities ==
The station is unstaffed. In February 2019, the local council installed a ticket machine on the southbound platform. The machine allows contactless, and card for tickets, as well as being able to collect tickets. Travel tickets can still be purchased on board the train. There are waiting shelters on both platforms (but no other permanent buildings), along with timetable posters and next train real-time information boards to offer train running details. Step-free access is available to both platforms, though the footbridge linking them has steps.

Northumberland County Council and the local rail users group SENRUG is campaigning to relocate the station to a new site 200 metres south of its present position, in order to better serve the town's Manor Walks shopping centre, Westmorland Retail Park and main employment areas. The proposed site would also allow for the construction of a dedicated bus-rail interchange, a larger car park and serve several residential estates to the west built in the 1960s and 1970s.

== Services ==
=== Northern Trains ===
As of the December 2025 timetable change, there is an hourly service between Newcastle and Morpeth on weekdays and Saturdays. At peak times, two trains per day (excluding Sunday) extend to/from Chathill.

Sundays also see an hourly service each way (upgraded from two-hourly before the winter 2025 timetable change). At present, all services are operated by Northern Trains.

Rolling stock used: Class 156 Super Sprinter and Class 158 Express Sprinter

=== TransPennine Express ===
In September 2021, TransPennine Express announced that they were seeking approval to have some of the services on their new five return trains weekday semi-fast Newcastle to Edinburgh return trains call at Cramlington. As of December 2023, TransPennine Express operate a limited service of one train to Newcastle on Mondays to Saturday mornings, with no Sunday service and no northbound service.

Rolling stock used: Class 802 Nova 1

Preceding station	National Rail	Following station
Manors towards Newcastle	Northern Trains; East Coast Main Line	Morpeth towards Morpeth or Chathill
Newcastle	TransPennine Express (North TransPennine); Southbound only, Mondays to Saturdays only	Morpeth
	Historical railways	
Annitsford	North Eastern Railway; York, Newcastle and Berwick Railway	Plessey

== Accidents and incidents ==
- On 26 May 1926, during the General Strike, an express passenger train, hauled by LNER A1 4-6-2 No. 2565 Merry Hampton, was deliberately derailed south of the station.
