= Plessey railway station =

Disused railway station in Northumberland, England

Plessey

General information
- Location: Plessey, Northumberland; England
- Coordinates: 55.0995°N 1.6333°W
- Grid reference: NZ235784
- Platforms: 2

Other information
- Status: Disused

History
- Original company: North Eastern Railway
- Pre-grouping: North Eastern Railway
- Post-grouping: LNER; British Rail (North Eastern)

Key dates
- July 1859: Opened
- 15 September 1958: Closed to passengers
- 2 April 1962: Closed completely
Location

Plessey railway station served the hamlet of Plessey, Northumberland, England from 1859 to 1962 on the East Coast Main Line.

== History ==
The station opened in July 1859, which was when it first appeared in the Bradshaw timetable. It was situated northwest of the level crossing on Shotton Lane. In the early versions of the timetable it was spelled as 'Plessy' and 'Plessay' but in 1864 and onwards it was spelled Plessey. There were two sidings at the station; one had a trailing junction with the up line southeast of the level crossing, the other was northwest of the level crossing and had a training junction with the down line with a headshunt. The station was closed to passengers on 15 September 1958 along with many other minor stations on the line and closed completely on 2 April 1962 when goods traffic ceased.

Preceding station	Historical railways	Following station
Cramlington; Line and station open	North Eastern Railway; York, Newcastle and Berwick Railway	Stannington; Line open, station closed
