= Dhoki Dam =

- Location within Maharashtra
- Official name: Dhoki Dam
- Location: Dhoki, Parner; India
- Coordinates: 19°10′21″N 74°25′5″E
- Opening date: 1981
- Owners: Government of Maharashtra, India

Dam and spillways
- Type of dam: Earth-fill (Earthen)
- Impounds: Kalu River
- Height: 17.33 m (56.9 ft)
- Length: 397 m (1,302 ft)

Reservoir
- Creates: Dhoki lake
- Total capacity: 1,240 km^{3} (300 cu mi)
- Surface area: 290 km^{2} (110 sq mi)

Dhoki Dam (Marathi: ढोकी धरण), is an earth-fill dam on Kalu river in Dhoki village in Parner taluka of Ahmednagar district of state of Maharashtra in India.

== Specifications ==
The height of the dam above lowest foundation is 17.33 m (56.9 ft) while the length is 397 m (1,302 ft). The gross storage capacity is 1,270 km^{3} (300 cu mi).

== Purpose ==
- Irrigation
- Drinking water for nearest villages

== See also ==
- Dams in Maharashtra
