= Palashi Dam =

- Location within Maharashtra
- Official name: Palashi Dam
- Location: Palashi, Parner; India
- Coordinates: 19°15′43″N 74°24′36″E
- Opening date: 1979
- Owners: Government of Maharashtra, India

Dam and spillways
- Type of dam: Earth-fill (Earthen)
- Impounds: Palashi River
- Height: 14.03 m (46.0 ft)
- Length: 660 m (2,170 ft)

Reservoir
- Creates: Palashi lake
- Total capacity: 860 km^{3} (210 cu mi)
- Surface area: 28 km^{2} (11 sq mi)

Palashi Dam (Marathi: पळशी धरण), is an earth-fill dam on Palashi river in Palashi village in Parner taluka of Ahmednagar district of state of Maharashtra in India.

== Specifications ==
The height of the dam above lowest foundation is 14.03 m (46.0 ft) while the length is 660 m (2,170 ft). The gross storage capacity is 1,060 km^{3} (250 cu mi).

== Purpose ==
It was designed and built to provide irrigation for farms and drinking water for the nearest villages.

== See also ==
- Dams in Maharashtra
