= Plassey railway station =

Railway station in West Bengal, India

PLASSEY
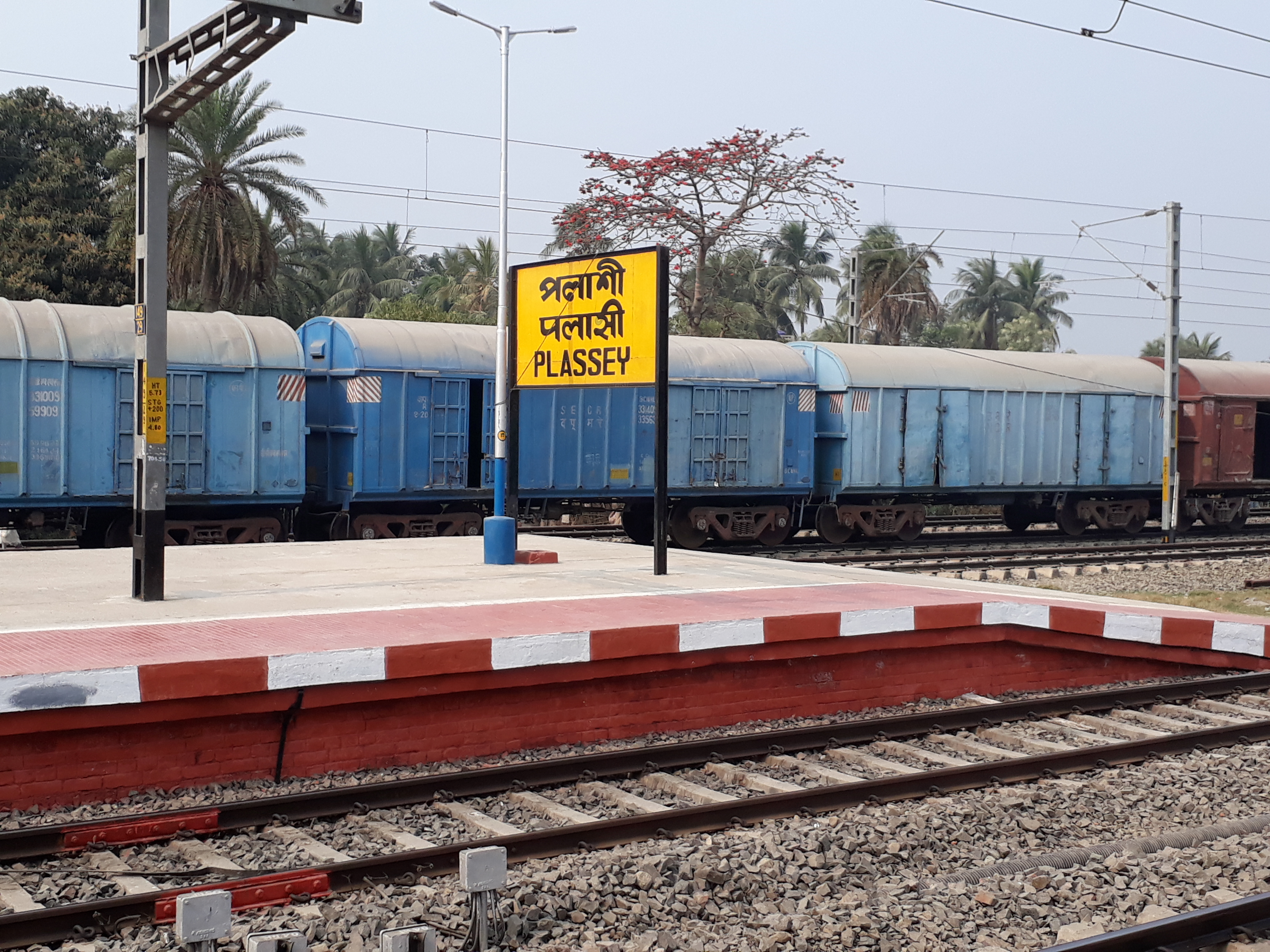
- Plassey railway station

General information
- Location: Mirabajar, Palashi, Nadia, West Bengal; India
- Coordinates: 23.778307°N 88.284884°E
- Elevation: 19 m (62 ft)
- System: Express train, Passenger train and Suburban train station
- Owner: Indian Railways
- Operator: Eastern Railway
- Line: Sealdah-Lalgola line
- Platforms: 3
- Tracks: 5

Construction
- Structure type: Model
- Parking: Yes
- Cycle facilities: Yes

Other information
- Status: Active
- Station code: PLY
- Zone(s): Eastern Railway
- Division(s): Sealdah

History
- Opened: 1905
- Electrified: 2007

Services
Preceding station	Kolkata Suburban Railway	Following station
Pagla Chandi towards Krishnanagar City Junction	Eastern Line Krishnanagar–Lalgola line	Siraj Nagar Halt towards Lalgola
Route map
Location
- Location within West Bengal Location within India

Plassey railway station is a railway station of the Sealdah-Lalgola line in the Eastern Railway zone of Indian Railways. The station is situated in Nadia district in the Indian state of West Bengal. It serves Palashi and the surrounding areas.

== History ==
Initially the Calcutta (Sealdah)–Kusthia line of Eastern Bengal Railway was opened to traffic in 1862. The Ranaghat–Lalgola branch line was established in 1905 as an extension of Sealdah–Ranaghat line. This railway station was named Plassey in accordance with the British pronunciation of "Palashi". The rail distance between Palashi and Sealdah is approximately 150 kilometres (93 mi). After the electrification and inauguration of double track by the Indian Railways, Plassey station was modified and reconstructed into three platforms.

== Electrification ==
The Krishnanagar–Lalgola section was electrified in 2004. In 2010 the line became double tracked.
