= Stannington, Northumberland =

Village and parish in England

Coordinates: 55.110°N 1.662°W

Stannington
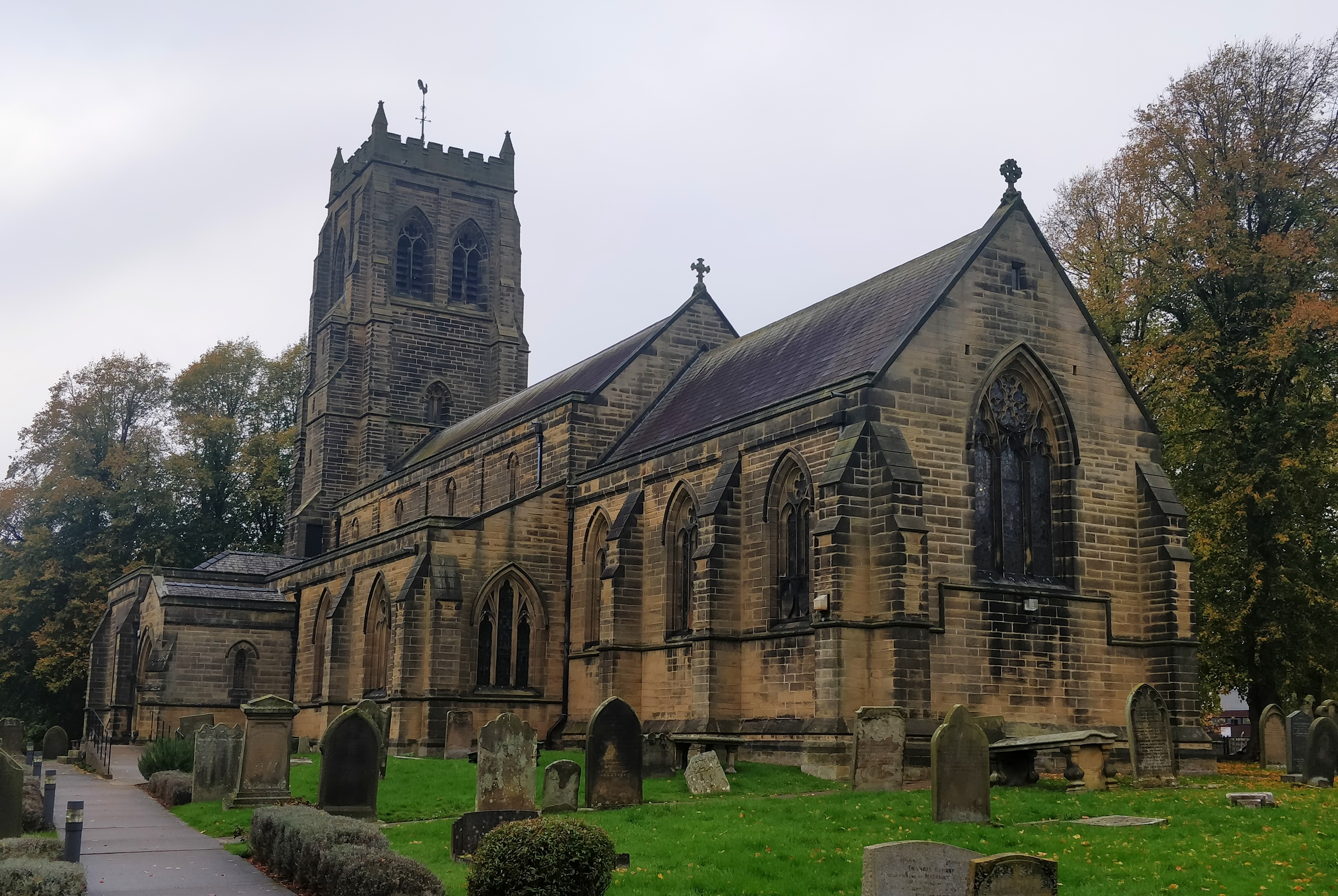
- St Mary's Church

- Location within Northumberland
- Population: 1,219 (2001 census)
- OS grid reference: NZ215795
- Unitary authority: Northumberland
- Ceremonial county: Northumberland
- Region: North East
- Country: England
- Sovereign state: United Kingdom
- Post town: MORPETH
- Postcode district: NE61
- Dialling code: 01670
- Police: Northumbria
- Fire: Northumberland
- Ambulance: North East
- UK Parliament: Hexham

Stannington is a village and civil parish in Northumberland, England. The population of the civil parish was 1,219 at the 2001 Census, increasing to 1,280 at the 2011 Census. Stannington is divided into three: Stannington North-East Quarter, Stannington North-West Quarter and Stannington South Quarter. The total area of Stannington, including Stannington Vale, is 10,093 acres (40.84 km^{2}). The parish includes the hamlet of Shotton.

== Buildings ==
=== St Mary's church ===
Stannington's oldest building is the church, dedicated to St Mary The Virgin. The original church on that site dated back to 1190AD.

Most of the current church was constructed in 1871, to a design by R J Johnson of Newcastle, at a cost of £6,000. It incorporates the 13th-century north arcade of the medieval church, and some medieval stained glass and grave covers.

The old vicarage, built in 1745, stands near the church, with the current vicarage behind.

=== Hospitals ===
There were two hospitals in the village. Stannington Children's Hospital was the first children's tuberculosis hospital in the country; St. Mary's Hospital was an asylum originally known as the Gateshead Lunatic Asylum. Both are now closed. One former hospital north-east of the village near Netherton was built in the 1930s and featured the Thomas Taylor retirement homes for Wansbeck residents. Behind the main complex was the Mona Taylor Maternity Hospital which was named after the leading suffragist, Mr Taylor's wife. Many children were born here until it too became an old people's home and, together with the rest of the site, was then owned by Northumberland County Council. Today this development is known as Hepscott Park with some original hospital buildings surviving in local authority use, other buildings converted into private homes and some additional new houses.

=== Village Hall ===
Stannington Village Hall is a community hub and a charming space and is available for hire whatever the occasion. The main hall seats 150 guests with a full-sized stage, sound and lighting for bands, entertainers, or productions of any type. The two adjoining side rooms each seat 30 and enjoy a fully equipped kitchen and separate bar with a glass wash. There is adequate off street parking, a disabled entrance, level internal floors and an accessible toilet with baby changing facilities.

The hall was formally opened on 24 October 1959 and is located in the heart of Stannington Village, which is situated 10 miles North of Newcastle upon Tyne in the beautiful, unspoiled and historic county of Northumberland with easy access from the A1, just next to the Ridley Arms.

The Hall is held in Trust for the community and its daily business is run by a Management Committee, made up of volunteers and Hall users. It is a non-profit registered charity and is funded through hall charges, fundraising events and grants. The hall welcomes regular local groups such as Art Groups, WI, Craft Groups and Yoga, musical events drawing big crowds, private parties, community events, celebrations, weddings and classes of all kinds.

=== Other buildings ===
Stannington First School is located near the church. The village used to have a post office which has since been converted into a hairdresser's.

Other listed buildings in the village include two bus shelters, built in 1937 to a design by Laurence Whistler and presented to the village by Lord Ridley in commemoration of the coronation of King George VI.

== Transport ==
The A1 road arcs past the village and in instances of traffic accidents or otherwise-motivated road closures, traffic from the A1 has been diverted through the village. This section of the A1 was substantially rebuilt with two new roundabouts and new junctions in 2003 and 2004 following a fatal accident in 1999.

In 1847 a railway station was opened near the village. Initially known as Netherton, it was renamed to Stannington in 1892, but passenger services ended in 1958 and the station finally closed to goods trains too in 1964.
