= Palashi =

Palashi Plassey
- Town
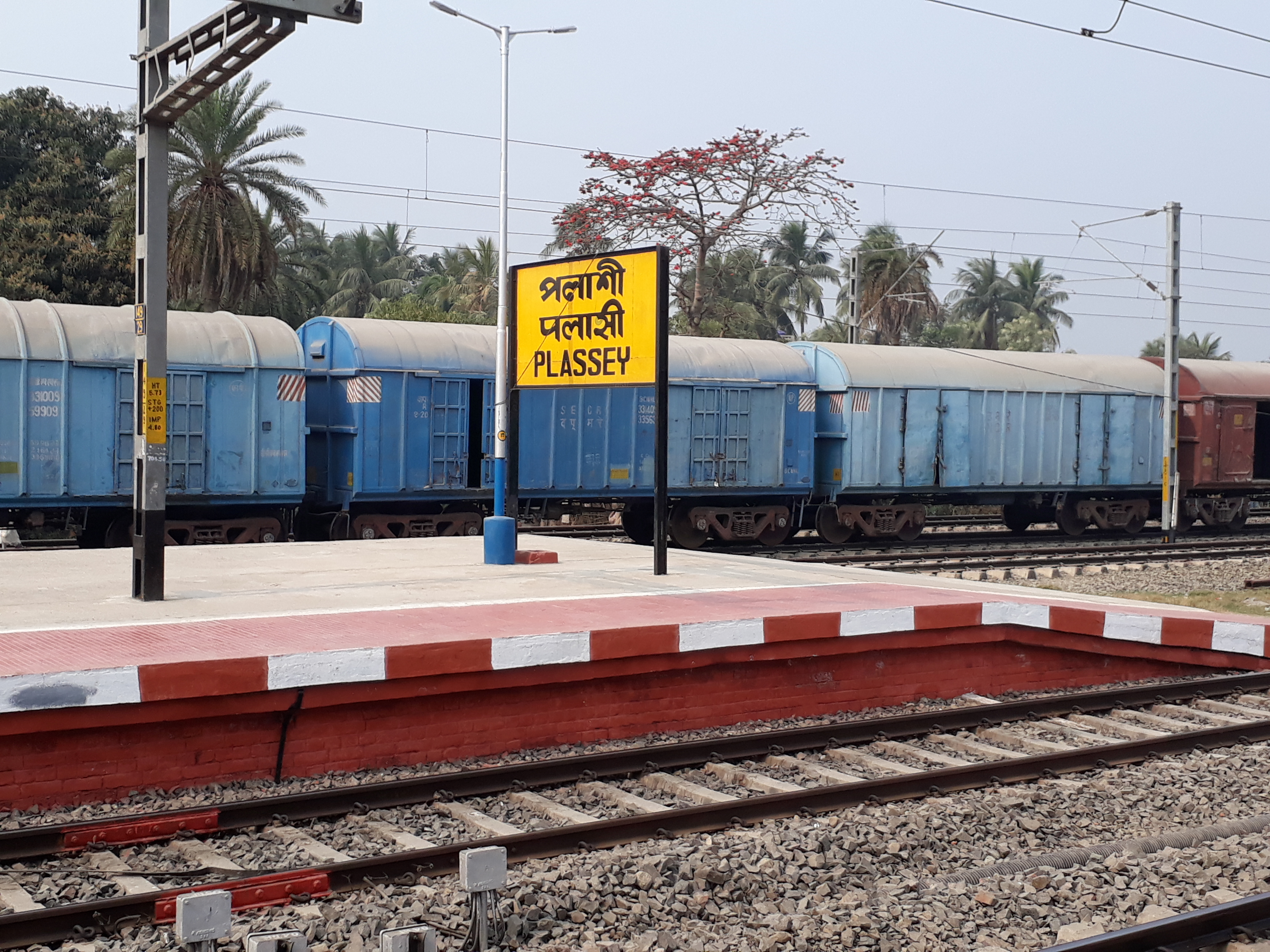
- Plassey railway station

- Location in West Bengal, India
- Coordinates: 23.80°N 88.25°E
- Country: India
- State: West Bengal
- District: Nadia
- Elevation: 17 m (56 ft)

Population (2011)
  - Total: 19,984

Languages
  - Official: Bengali, English
- Time zone: UTC+5:30 (IST)
- PIN: 741156
- Telephone code: 91 3474
- ISO 3166 code: IN-WB
- Vehicle registration: WB
- Website: wb.gov.in

Palashi or Plassey (Bengali pronunciation: [pɔlaʃi]) is a town on the east bank of Bhagirathi River, located approximately 50 kilometres north of the city of Krishnanagar in Kaliganj CD Block in the Nadia district of West Bengal, India.

It is particularly well known due to the Battle of Plassey fought there in June 1757, between the private army of the British East India Company and the army of Siraj-ud-Daulah, the Nawab of Bengal.

== Etymology ==
The name Palashi is derived from the Bengali word for the red-flowered tree পলাশ (ISO: palāś, English: Butea, Latin: Butea frondosa or Butea monosperma). The Bengali word is ultimately derived from Sanskrit: पलाश, romanized: palāśa. The British East India Company referred to it as ‘Plassey’.

== History ==
Palashi achieved historical significance when, on 23 June 1757, the Battle of Plassey was fought between the forces of Siraj-ud-Daulah, the last reigning Nawab of Bengal (and his French support troops), and the troops of the British East India Company, led by Robert Clive. This event, part of the Seven Years' War, ultimately led to the establishment of British rule in Bengal and, eventually, the whole Indian subcontinent. During British rule Plassey became part of Nadia District of Bengal.

== Geography ==
Cities and towns in Krishnanagr Sadar subdivision of Nadia district
M: municipal town/ city, CT: census town, R: rural/ urban centre, H: place of historical/ religious interest, T: place of tourist interest.
Owing to space constraints in the small map, the actual locations in a larger map may vary slightly

=== Location ===
Palashi is located in the West Bengal state of India at 23.80°N 88.25°E. It has an average elevation of 17 m (56 ft).

=== Area overview ===
Nadia district is mostly alluvial plains lying to the east of Hooghly River, locally known as Bhagirathi. The alluvial plains are cut across by such distributaries as Jalangi, Churni and Ichhamati. With these rivers getting silted up, floods are a recurring feature. The Krishnanagar Sadar subdivision, presented in the map alongside, has the Bhagirathi on the west, with Purba Bardhaman district lying across the river. The long stretch along the Bhagirathi has many swamps. The area between the Bhagirathi and the Jalangi, which flows through the middle of the subdivision, is known as Kalantar, a low-lying tract of black clay soil. A big part of the subdivision forms the Krishnanagar-Santipur Plain, which occupies the central part of the district. The Jalangi, after flowing through the middle of the subdivision, turns right and joins the Bhagirathi. On the south-east, the Churni separates the Krishnanagar-Santipur Plain from the Ranaghat-Chakdaha Plain. The east forms the boundary with Bangladesh. The subdivision is moderately urbanized. 20.795% of the population lives in urban areas and 79.205% lives in rural areas.

Note: The map alongside presents some of the notable locations in the subdivision. All places marked in the map are linked in the larger full screen map. All the four subdivisions are presented with maps on the same scale – the size of the maps vary as per the area of the subdivision.

== Demographics ==
As per the 2011 Census of India, Palashi had a total population of 19,984, of which 10,288 (51%) were males and 9,696 (49%) were females. Population below 6 years was 2,700. The total number of literates in Palashi was 11,462 (66.32% of the population over 6 years).

== Transportation ==
Palashi is connected with Kolkata by railway and bus services. Lalgola passengers and few express trains stop in Plassey railway station. National highway no 34 also passes through the Palashi.

== Culture and memorials ==
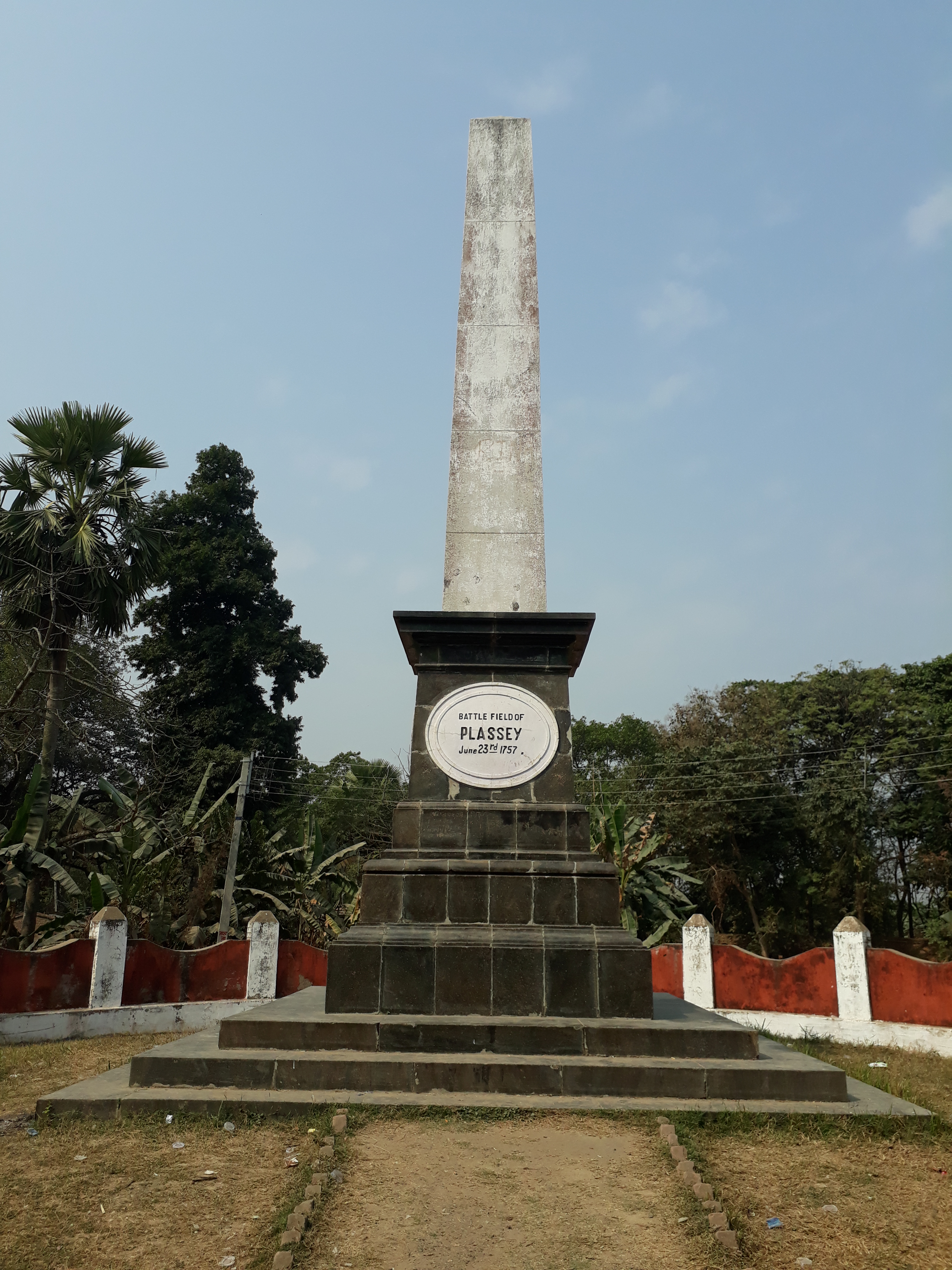
Plassey Monument at the battlefield.

There is a Monument, commonly known as Palashi Monument established in memoirs of the martyrs of the battle. The Monument is protected and supervised by the Archaeological Survey of India. The grounds where the historic Battle of Plassey was fought is today marked with shrines, obelisks and memorials to the fallen generals and soldiers of Siraj-ud-Daulah. A set of three obelisks marks homage to the spot where Bakshi Mir Madan (the chief of the Nawab's artillery), Bahadur Ali Khan (Commander of Musketeers) and Nauwe Singh Hazari (the Captain of Artillery) were killed in the battle.

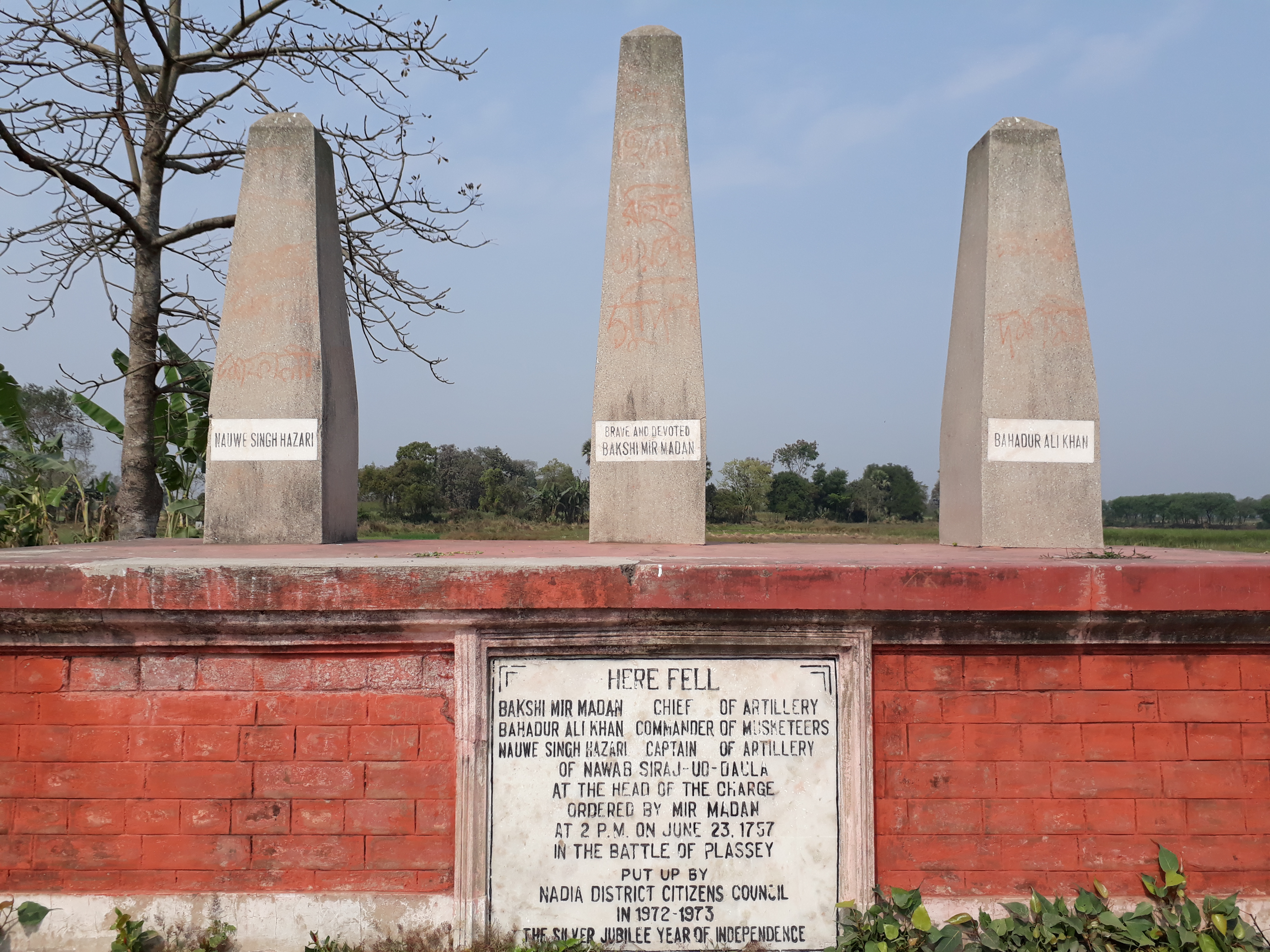
Three Obelisks of Mirmadan, Nabe Singh Hajari and Bahadur Khan near Plassey

A plaque indicates that they fell here at 14:00 on 23 June 1757 and were leaders of Nawab Siraj ud-Daulah, at the head of the charge ordered by Mir Madan. Almost 5 km north from the Plassey battlefield, there is a Tomb of Farid Shah in Faridpur village, Dead body of Mir Madan was buried there.

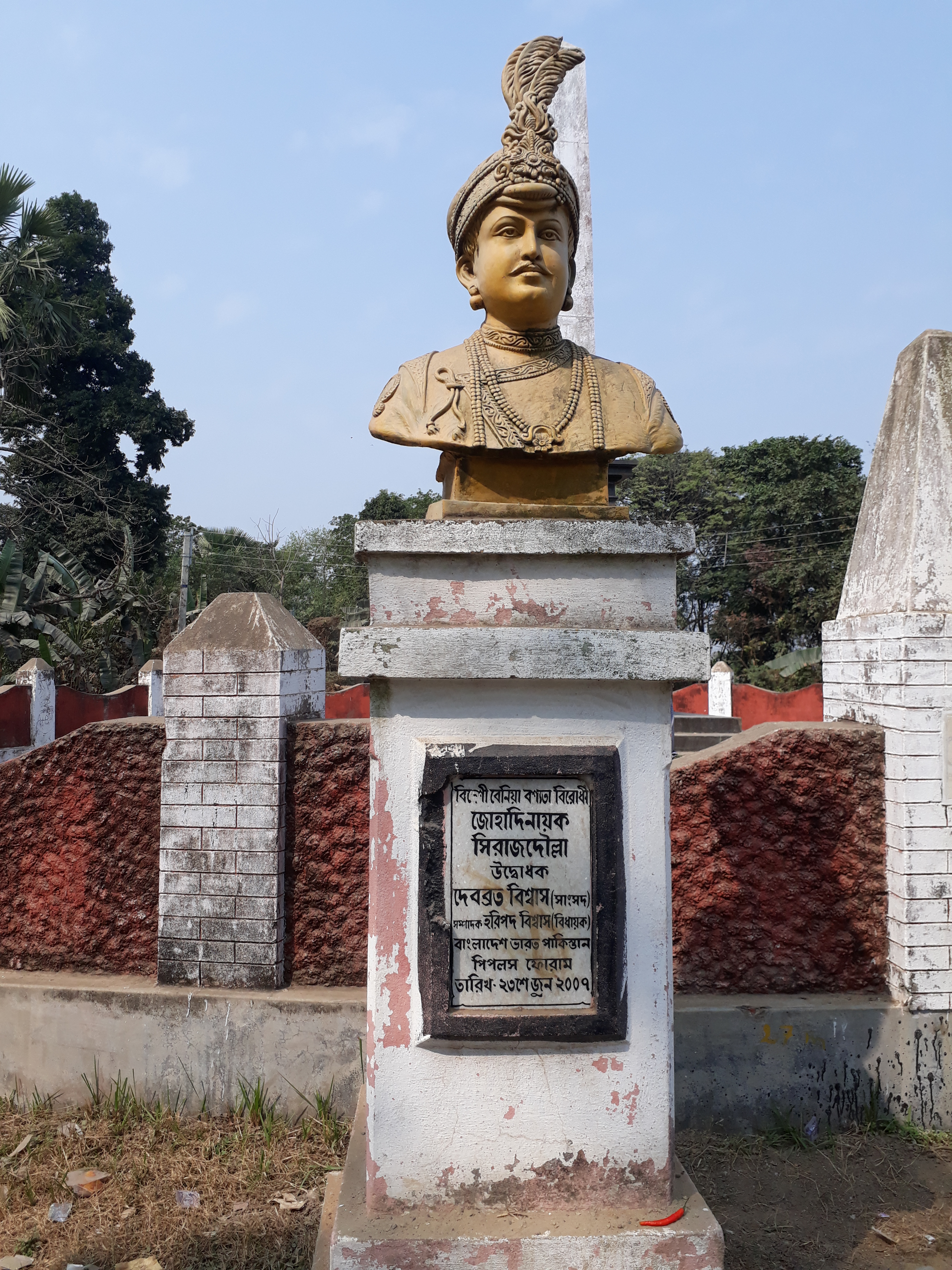
Statue of Siraj

A gold coloured statue of Siraj ud-Daulah lies next to the Palashi Monument, in a clearing amidst mango orchards and fields. The tombs of Siraj ud-Daulah, Mir Jafar, their wives and a number of generals in Siraj's army lie close by around Murshidabad. Mausoleums built around the tombs of Siraj Ud-Daula, Azimunessa begum and other soldiers who fell in the war can be found close by at Khosh Bag and Jafarganj cemetery.

In County Clare, Ireland, an estate owned by Major-General Robert Clive, was renamed Plassey in order to commemorate the Battle of Plassey and his successful part in it. At the nearby University of Limerick, the original office of the president was named Plassey House in the late 18th century, also to commemorate a family connection to the battle, and the building still serves as an important administrative centre of the university.
