= Sakri Taluka =

Sakri Taluka is in Dhule District of Maharashtra state in India. Headquarters for the taluka is the town of Sakri.

== Geography ==
Part of Sakri Taluka is in the Western Ghats, and 35.27% of the taluka is forested.

Sakri Tehsil has eight revenue circles with 225 revenue villages, most quite small.
