= Sakri =

- Town
- Location in Maharashtra, India
- Coordinates: 20°59′25″N 74°18′52″E
- Country: India
- State: Maharashtra
- District: Dhule
- Biggest City of Taluka: Pimpalner

Government
  - Body: Sakri Nagar Panchayat
- Elevation: 405 m (1,329 ft)

Population (2011)
  - Total: 21,764
- Demonym: Sakrikar

Languages
  - Official: Marathi
- Time zone: UTC+5:30 (IST)
- PIN: 424304
- Vehicle registration: MH-18
- Lok Sabha constituency: Nandurbar
- Vidhan Sabha constituency: Sakri

Sakri is a census town and a taluka in the Dhule District of the Nashik division, Maharashtra state, India. The town of Sakri is the administrative headquarters for Sakri Taluka. Another Sakri is in Bihar, which is now a railway junction.

Sakri is a Nagar Panchayat. The people there are mostly Hindu with Jain, Muslim and Sikh minorities. The languages mostly spoken are Marathi, Ahirani and Bhili.

The town is located on National Highway 6 which is now Asian Highway AH46 running between Hazira (near Surat) in Gujarat to Kolkota, West Bengal. This highway connects it with to the larger Delhi Mumbai Industrial Corridor (DMIC) which once completed will be game changing for the industrial investments and growth.

Sakri Taluka has recently witnessed rapid investment in Green Energy Projects including Solar Energy Projects as well as Wind Mills Project run by Suzlon Company.

Sakri is the second largest tehsil in Maharashtra state by land area, after Chikhaldara (Amravati).

== Subdivisions of Sakri taluka ==
1. Pimpalner City (semi-urban Area)
2. Sakri city(semi-urban Area)
3. Dusane (North- East Sakri Taluka)
4. Nizampur (North- West Sakri Taluka)
5. Kasare (South- East Sakri Taluka)
6. Dahivel (West Sakri Taluka)

== Demography ==
As per Census of India year 2011, the population was 21,764.

Year	Male	Female	Total Population	Change	Religion (%)							
Year	Male	Female	Total Population	Change	Hindu	Muslim	Christian	Sikhs	Buddhist	Jain	Other religions and persuasions	Religion not stated
2011	11202	10562	21764	-	82.747	14.717	0.037	0.340	0.533	1.516	0.000	0.110

== Tourism ==
=== Shree Vimalnath Bhagwan Tirth, Balsana, Sakri, Dhule ===
Pratima (Idol) of Shree Vimalnath Bhagwan was found by a farmer while ploughing his field. This 77 inches pratima was kept in the farmers house at the village Balsana, in Dhule District of Maharashtra. Param Pujya Acharya Shrimad Vijay Vidyanand Surishwarji, who was then a Muni and was in the vicinity of Dhule, heard about this. He went to Balsana and visited the farmer. Param Pujya Shree convinced the farmer to hand over the Pratima to the Jains, so that proper care and puja according to Jain Rituals could be performed. The farmer agreed.

Param Pujya Shree Vidyanandji Maharaj Saheb then called a meeting of many Jain Sanghs. After careful deliberations and upon suggestions of all Jain Sanghs present, he decided and declared that Shree Shitalnath Bhagwan Sanstha, Dhule will own, build and manage temple of Shree Vimalnath Bhagwan, at Balsana. Till date this temple is owned and governed by Dhule Sangh.

Kanhaiyalal Maharaj Temple, Dhaner-Amali, Sakri, Dhule

God kanhaiyalal Maharaj is said to be avatar of 'God Vishnu'. The temple is holy and ancient.

Alaldari Waterfalls

Close to kanhaiyalala Maharaj Temple, there is a valley called "Alal Valley". In rainy season, a number of waterfalls form in Alaldari.

=== Goddess Kanbai Temple, Balsana, Sakri, Dhule ===
Goddess kanbai is said to be "avatar" of goddess parvati. She is well worshiped goddess in Maharashtra as well as the places where maharashtrians lived. She is said to be wife of "Kanher", "avatar" of God Shiva. This temple was made by Holkar queen. Now-a-days it is preserved by Maharashtra Government. The area around this ancient temple contains two more temples. One of God Shiva and one Of God Surya (Sun). The Surya temple is broken and also the idol of God Surya is broken, The Shiva Temple is in well condition and worshiped by the villagers.
