= Kopargaon Assembly constituency =

Constituency of the Maharashtra legislative assembly in India

Coordinates: 19.89°N 74.48°E

Kopargaon
- Constituency No. 219 for the Maharashtra Legislative Assembly
- Ashutosh Kale, present MLA of Kopargaon

Constituency details
- Country: India
- Region: Western India
- State: Maharashtra
- District: Ahmed Nagar
- Lok Sabha constituency: Kopargaon
- Established: 1951
- Total electors: 289,962
- Reservation: None

Member of Legislative Assembly
- 15th Maharashtra Legislative Assembly
- Incumbent Ashutosh Ashokrao Kale
- Party: NCP
- Alliance: NDA

Kopargaon Assembly constituency is one of the 288 Vidhan Sabha (Legislative Assembly) constituencies of Maharashtra state in Western India.

== Overview ==
Kopargaon (constituency number 219) is one of the twelve Vidhan Sabha constituencies located in the Ahmednagar district. It comprises the entire Kopargaon taluka of the district.

Kopargaon is part of the Shirdi Lok Sabha constituency along with five other Vidhan Sabha segments in this district, namely Akole, Shirdi, Sangamner, Shrirampur and Nevasa.

== Members of the Legislative Assembly ==
Election	Member	Party
1952	Jagannath Shankar Barhate	Indian National Congress
1978	Shankarrao Genuji Kolhe	Indian National Congress
1980	Shankarrao Genuji Kolhe	Indian National Congress (I)
1985	Dadasaheb Shahji Rohamare	Indian National Congress
1990	Shankarrao Genuji Kolhe	Indian National Congress
1995	Shankarrao Genuji Kolhe	Indian National Congress
1999	Shankarrao Genuji Kolhe	Nationalist Congress Party
2004	Ashokrao Shankarrao Kale	Shiv Sena
2009	Ashokrao Shankarrao Kale	Shiv Sena
2014	Snehalata Kolhe	Bharatiya Janata Party
2019	Ashutosh Ashokrao Kale	Nationalist Congress Party
2024	Ashutosh Ashokrao Kale	Nationalist Congress Party

== Election results ==
=== Assembly Election 2024 ===
2024 Maharashtra Legislative Assembly election : Kopargaon
Party	Candidate	Votes	%	±%
NCP	Ashutosh Ashokrao Kale	161,147	78.09%	New
NCP-SP	Sandeep Gorakshanath Varpe	36,523	17.70%	New
Baliraja Party	Shivaji Popatrao Kavade	3,640	1.76%	New
NOTA	None of the above	1,693	0.82%	▲0.01
Margin of victory		124,624	60.39%	▲59.98
Turnout		208,050	71.75%	▼4.66
Total valid votes		206,357		
Registered electors		289,962		▲9.34
Nationalist Congress Party (post–2023) gain from NCP		Swing	▲34.51	

=== Assembly Election 2019 ===
2019 Maharashtra Legislative Assembly election : Kopargaon
Party	Candidate	Votes	%	±%
NCP	Ashutosh Ashokrao Kale	87,566	43.58%	▲42.45
BJP	Snehalata Kolhe	86,744	43.17%	▼7.83
Independent	Rajesh Namdeorao Parjane	15,446	7.69%	New
Independent	Vahadane Vijay Suryabhan	4,047	2.01%	New
Independent	Ashok Vijay Gaikwad	3,914	1.95%	New
NOTA	None of the above	1,622	0.81%	▲0.36
Margin of victory		822	0.41%	▼14.55
Turnout		202,631	76.41%	▼3.57
Total valid votes		200,918		
Registered electors		265,184		▲7.91
NCP gain from BJP		Swing	▼7.42	

=== Assembly Election 2014 ===
2014 Maharashtra Legislative Assembly election : Kopargaon
Party	Candidate	Votes	%	±%
BJP	Snehalata Kolhe	99,763	51.00%	New
SS	Ashutosh Ashokrao Kale	70,493	36.04%	▼12.80
INC	Autade Nitin Bhanudas	19,586	10.01%	New
NCP	Ashok Vijay Gaikwad	2,205	1.13%	▼43.85
NOTA	None of the above	873	0.45%	New
Margin of victory		29,270	14.96%	▲11.10
Turnout		196,545	79.98%	▲3.60
Total valid votes		195,607		
Registered electors		245,756		▲8.25
BJP gain from SS		Swing	▲2.16	

=== Assembly Election 2009 ===
2009 Maharashtra Legislative Assembly election : Kopargaon
Party	Candidate	Votes	%	±%
SS	Ashokrao Shankarrao Kale	84,680	48.84%	▼4.71
NCP	Bipindada Shankarrao Kolhe	77,989	44.98%	▲2.72
RPI(A)	Damale Babasaheb Gangadhar	4,431	2.56%	New
Independent	Kolhe Bipin Chhaburao	1,513	0.87%	New
MNS	Jadhav Balasaheb Karbhari	1,295	0.75%	New
Independent	Seni Sunil Babulal	1,293	0.75%	New
Margin of victory		6,691	3.86%	▼7.44
Turnout		173,411	76.38%	▼4.77
Total valid votes		173,390		
Registered electors		227,023		▲27.59
SS hold		Swing	▼4.71	

=== Assembly Election 2004 ===
2004 Maharashtra Legislative Assembly election : Kopargaon
Party	Candidate	Votes	%	±%
SS	Ashokrao Shankarrao Kale	77,326	53.55%	▲20.57
NCP	Bipindada Shankarrao Kolhe	61,012	42.26%	▲5.43
BSP	Prakash Sadashiv Karde	2,111	1.46%	New
Independent	Randhir Sathish Nivrutti	1,348	0.93%	New
Independent	Khan Anwar Dilawar	941	0.65%	New
Margin of victory		16,314	11.30%	▲7.45
Turnout		144,395	81.15%	▲4.64
Total valid votes		144,388		
Registered electors		177,938		▲17.30
SS gain from NCP		Swing	▲16.72	

=== Assembly Election 1999 ===
1999 Maharashtra Legislative Assembly election : Kopargaon
Party	Candidate	Votes	%	±%
NCP	Shankarrao Genuji Kolhe	40,933	36.83%	New
SS	Namdeorao Rakhamaji Parjane	36,654	32.98%	▼9.55
INC	Ashokrao Shankarrao Kale	32,774	29.49%	▼19.21
CPI	Shinde Sangita Pandharinath	765	0.69%	New
Margin of victory		4,279	3.85%	▼2.32
Turnout		116,065	76.51%	▼0.63
Total valid votes		111,126		
Registered electors		151,696		▲2.82
NCP gain from INC		Swing	▼11.87	

=== Assembly Election 1995 ===
1995 Maharashtra Legislative Assembly election : Kopargaon
Party	Candidate	Votes	%	±%
INC	Shankarrao Genuji Kolhe	53,999	48.70%	▼12.21
SS	Bhagatsing Dayaram Alias Raosaheb Sonawane	47,157	42.53%	▲7.28
Independent	Borawake Bhaskarrao Shankarrao	2,953	2.66%	New
Independent	Rohamare Annasaheb Dagadu	1,384	1.25%	New
Samajwadi Janata Party (Maharashtra)	Aher P. D. Alias Parasnath Deoram	1,303	1.18%	New
Independent	Salve Bhikaji Shripat	727	0.66%	New
Independent	Jaibai Shejwal Arjunrao	669	0.60%	New
Margin of victory		6,842	6.17%	▼19.49
Turnout		113,809	77.14%	▲11.81
Total valid votes		110,874		
Registered electors		147,538		▲1.56
INC hold		Swing	▼12.21	

=== Assembly Election 1990 ===
1990 Maharashtra Legislative Assembly election : Kopargaon
Party	Candidate	Votes	%	±%
INC	Shankarrao Genuji Kolhe	56,673	60.91%	▲6.04
SS	Sambhajirao Kisan Kale	32,801	35.25%	New
JD	Badrinath Jagannath Devkar	2,417	2.60%	New
Margin of victory		23,872	25.66%	▲14.16
Turnout		94,907	65.33%	▼2.24
Total valid votes		93,048		
Registered electors		145,278		▲25.41
INC hold		Swing	▲6.04	

=== Assembly Election 1985 ===
1985 Maharashtra Legislative Assembly election : Kopargaon
Party	Candidate	Votes	%	±%
INC	Dadasaheb Shahji Rohamare	42,028	54.87%	New
IC(S)	Sambhajirao Kisan Kale	33,221	43.37%	New
RPI	Bhrud Sampatrao Jamanrao	1,141	1.49%	New
Margin of victory		8,807	11.50%	▼1.26
Turnout		78,269	67.57%	▼8.57
Total valid votes		76,599		
Registered electors		115,838		▲11.93
INC gain from INC(I)		Swing	▼1.17	

=== Assembly Election 1980 ===
1980 Maharashtra Legislative Assembly election : Kopargaon
Party	Candidate	Votes	%	±%
INC(I)	Shankarrao Genuji Kolhe	43,166	56.04%	▲54.28
INC(U)	Shankarrao Kale	33,335	43.27%	New
Independent	Jadhav Shravan Jairam	532	0.69%	New
Margin of victory		9,831	12.76%	▼5.81
Turnout		78,794	76.14%	▼1.34
Total valid votes		77,033		
Registered electors		103,489		▲10.23
INC(I) gain from INC		Swing	▼1.07	

=== Assembly Election 1978 ===
1978 Maharashtra Legislative Assembly election : Kopargaon
Party	Candidate	Votes	%	±%
INC	Shankarrao Genuji Kolhe	40,414	57.11%	▲2.26
JP	Jadhav Panditrao Gangadhar	27,274	38.54%	New
Independent	Khandizoo Vallabhrao Sukaji	1,608	2.27%	New
INC(I)	Gawali Dada Punja	1,243	1.76%	New
Margin of victory		13,140	18.57%	▼12.42
Turnout		72,742	77.48%	▲24.08
Total valid votes		70,765		
Registered electors		93,881		▲65.30
INC hold		Swing	▲2.26	

=== Assembly Election 1952 ===
1952 Bombay State Legislative Assembly election : Kopargaon
Party	Candidate	Votes	%	±%
INC	Jagannath Shankar Barhate	16,636	54.85%	New
Kamgar Kisan Paksha	Shankarrao Kale	7,236	23.86%	New
Socialist	Gaware Gangadhar Muktaji	5,878	19.38%	New
Independent	Ajmeri Uttamchand Chhagniram	581	1.92%	New
Margin of victory		9,400	30.99%	
Turnout		30,331	53.40%	
Total valid votes		30,331		
Registered electors		56,796		
INC win (new seat)				

== See also ==
- Sangamner
- List of constituencies of Maharashtra Vidhan Sabha
