= Parner Assembly constituency =

Constituency of the Maharashtra legislative assembly in India

Coordinates: 19.00°N 74.44°E

Parner
- Constituency No. 224 for the Maharashtra Legislative Assembly

Constituency details
- Country: India
- Region: Western India
- State: Maharashtra
- District: Ahmednagar
- Lok Sabha constituency: Ahmednagar
- Established: 1955
- Total electors: 352,291
- Reservation: None

Member of Legislative Assembly
- 15th Maharashtra Legislative Assembly
- Incumbent Kashinath Mahadu Date
- Party: NCP
- Alliance: NDA
- Elected year: 2024

Parner Assembly constituency is one of the 288 Vidhan Sabha (legislative assembly) constituencies of Maharashtra state, western India. This constituency is located in Ahmednagar district.

== Geographical scope ==
The constituency comprises Nalegaon and Chas revenue circles of Ahmednagar taluka and Parner taluka.

== Members of Legislative Assembly ==
Year	Member	Party
From 1952 - 1957 known as Ahmednagar Taluka-Parner
1952	Bhaskarrao Auti	Communist Party of India
1957	Bhaskarrao Auti	Independent
1962	Dattatray Bhagat	Indian National Congress
1967	N. T. Gunjal	Indian National Congress
1972	Shankarrao Kale	Indian National Congress
1978	Shankarrao Kale	Indian National Congress
1980	Prabhakar Thube	Communist Party of India
1985	Nandkumar Zaware Patil	Indian National Congress
1990	Nandkumar Zaware Patil	Indian National Congress
1995	Vasantrao Zaware Patil	Indian National Congress
1999	Vasantrao Zaware Patil	Nationalist Congress Party
2004	Vijayrao Auti	Shiv Sena
2009	Vijayrao Auti	Shiv Sena
2014	Vijayrao Auti	Shiv Sena
2019	Nilesh Lanke	Nationalist Congress Party
2024	Kashinath Date	Nationalist Congress Party

== Election results ==
=== Assembly Election 2024 ===
2024 Maharashtra Legislative Assembly election : Parner
Party	Candidate	Votes	%	±%
NCP	Kashinath Mahadu Date	113,630	45.82%	New
NCP-SP	Rani Nilesh Lanke	112,104	45.21%	New
Independent	Karle Sandesh Tukaram	10,803	4.36%	New
RSPS	Sakharam Malu Sarak	3,582	1.44%	New
Independent	Vijayrao Auti	2,539	1.02%	New
NOTA	None of the Above	963	0.39%	▼0.27
Margin of victory		1,526	0.62%	▼25.93
Turnout		248,938	70.66%	▲0.41
Total valid votes		247,975		
Registered electors		352,291		▲9.39
NCP gain from NCP		Swing	▼16.28	

=== Assembly Election 2019 ===
2019 Maharashtra Legislative Assembly election : Parner
Party	Candidate	Votes	%	±%
NCP	Nilesh Dnyandev Lanke	139,963	62.10%	▲39.15
SS	Vijayrao Bhaskarrao Auti	80,125	35.55%	▼1.13
VBA	Eng. D. R. Shendage	2,499	1.11%	New
NOTA	None of the Above	1,479	0.66%	▼0.24
Margin of victory		59,838	26.55%	▲12.82
Turnout		227,111	70.52%	▲2.28
Total valid votes		225,377		
Registered electors		322,054		▲9.15
NCP gain from SS		Swing	▲25.42	

=== Assembly Election 2014 ===
2014 Maharashtra Legislative Assembly election : Parner
Party	Candidate	Votes	%	±%
SS	Vijayrao Bhaskarrao Auti	73,263	36.68%	▼8.35
NCP	Sujit Vasantrao Zaware Patil	45,841	22.95%	▲21.59
Independent	Lamkhade Madhavrao Bhausaheb	45,822	22.94%	New
BJP	Tambe Babasaheb Rambhau	24,050	12.04%	New
MNS	Mohanrao Shankar Randhawan	2,208	1.11%	▼2.67
INC	Jadhav Shivaji Gopala	1,789	0.90%	New
NOTA	None of the Above	1,788	0.90%	New
CPI	Ambadas Keruji Daund	1,620	0.81%	New
Margin of victory		27,422	13.73%	▼2.38
Turnout		201,852	68.41%	▲3.99
Total valid votes		199,752		
Registered electors		295,044		▲12.06
SS hold		Swing	▼8.35	

=== Assembly Election 2009 ===
2009 Maharashtra Legislative Assembly election : Parner
Party	Candidate	Votes	%	±%
SS	Vijayrao Bhaskarrao Auti	75,538	45.03%	▼4.98
Independent	Zaware Patil Vasantrao Krushnarao	48,515	28.92%	New
Independent	Shelke Prataprao Gangadhar	22,544	13.44%	New
MNS	Gaikwad Sabajirao Mahadu	6,326	3.77%	New
SWP	Dere Gulab Bhagwant	3,211	1.91%	New
NCP	Uchale Madhukar Mhatarba	2,281	1.36%	▼40.98
BSP	Salave Devdatta Kondaji	1,555	0.93%	▼0.24
Margin of victory		27,023	16.11%	▲8.43
Turnout		167,866	63.76%	▼5.72
Total valid votes		167,751		
Registered electors		263,287		▲53.59
SS hold		Swing	▼4.98	

=== Assembly Election 2004 ===
2004 Maharashtra Legislative Assembly election : Parner
Party	Candidate	Votes	%	±%
SS	Vijayrao Bhaskarrao Auti	59,528	50.01%	▲26.72
NCP	Patil Vansantrao Kishanrao	50,391	42.34%	▲9.92
SP	Inamdar Shabbir Fakair Mahammad	2,205	1.85%	New
RSPS	Pingat Sonyabapu Dattu	1,704	1.43%	New
Independent	Sabajirao Mahadu Gaikwad	1,421	1.19%	New
BSP	Ambedkar Ragunath Jagannath	1,386	1.16%	▼2.70
Shivrajya Party	Chede Rajesh Ganpat	949	0.80%	New
Margin of victory		9,137	7.68%	▼1.45
Turnout		119,063	69.46%	▲5.29
Total valid votes		119,022		
Registered electors		171,417		▲17.49
SS gain from NCP		Swing	▲17.60	

=== Assembly Election 1999 ===
1999 Maharashtra Legislative Assembly election : Parner
Party	Candidate	Votes	%	±%
NCP	Zaware Patil Vasantrao Krushnarao	30,333	32.41%	New
SS	Gaikwad Sabajirao Mahadu	21,796	23.29%	▲5.30
Independent	Nandkumar Bhausaheb Zaware	18,639	19.92%	New
INC	Pathare Dnyandeo Daulatrao	13,575	14.51%	▼11.24
BSP	Gaikwad Raosaheb Ramchandra	3,620	3.87%	New
Independent	Kawad Gitaram Narayan	2,929	3.13%	New
CPI	Adv. P. R. Kaware	1,538	1.64%	▼8.05
Margin of victory		8,537	9.12%	▲3.27
Turnout		102,557	70.30%	▼15.32
Total valid votes		93,584		
Registered electors		145,894		▲3.33
NCP gain from INC		Swing	▲6.67	

=== Assembly Election 1995 ===
1995 Maharashtra Legislative Assembly election : Parner
Party	Candidate	Votes	%	±%
INC	Zaware Patil Vasantrao Krushnarao	28,886	25.75%	▼16.33
Independent	Nandkumar Bhausaheb Zaware	22,324	19.90%	New
Independent	Gulabrao Sakharam Shelke	20,643	18.40%	New
SS	Sabajirao Mahadu Gaikawad	20,182	17.99%	▼14.28
CPI	Thube Babasaheb	10,874	9.69%	▼15.05
JD	Adv. Shindenath Madhavrao	5,053	4.50%	New
Independent	Jagdale Murlidhar Kishan	1,659	1.48%	New
Margin of victory		6,562	5.85%	▼3.95
Turnout		115,117	81.53%	▲14.86
Total valid votes		112,196		
Registered electors		141,195		▲7.64
INC hold		Swing	▼16.33	

=== Assembly Election 1990 ===
1990 Maharashtra Legislative Assembly election : Parner
Party	Candidate	Votes	%	±%
INC	Zaware Nandkumar Bhausaheb	35,657	42.07%	▲8.02
SS	Gaikwad Sabajirao Mahadu	27,350	32.27%	New
CPI	Thube Prabhakar Appasaheb	20,970	24.74%	New
Margin of victory		8,307	9.80%	▲8.26
Turnout		86,988	66.31%	▲6.84
Total valid votes		84,747		
Registered electors		131,179		▲21.96
INC hold		Swing	▲8.02	

=== Assembly Election 1985 ===
1985 Maharashtra Legislative Assembly election : Parner
Party	Candidate	Votes	%	±%
INC	Zaware Nandkumar Bahusaheb	21,155	34.05%	New
Independent	Thube Babasaheb Alias Prabhakar Appasheb	20,198	32.51%	New
IC(S)	Auti Vijay Bhaskarrao	18,098	29.13%	New
Independent	Ramchandra Deokaji Alias R. D. Pawar	1,190	1.92%	New
LKD	Shinde Bhusaheb Kisan	554	0.89%	New
Margin of victory		957	1.54%	▼12.39
Turnout		63,986	59.49%	▲0.35
Total valid votes		62,126		
Registered electors		107,557		▲11.83
INC gain from CPI		Swing	▼1.87	

=== Assembly Election 1980 ===
1980 Maharashtra Legislative Assembly election : Parner
Party	Candidate	Votes	%	±%
CPI	Babasaheb Prabhakar Appasaheb Thube	19,836	35.92%	▲4.06
INC(U)	Dnyandeo Daulatrao Pathare	12,144	21.99%	New
Independent	Gulabrao Sakharam Shelake	9,486	17.18%	New
INC(I)	Nandakumar Bhausaheb Zaware	9,220	16.70%	▲13.19
BJP	Nath Madhavrao Shinde	2,602	4.71%	New
RPI(K)	Ambadas Gangashar Shinde	1,928	3.49%	New
Margin of victory		7,692	13.93%	▲11.79
Turnout		56,807	59.06%	▼8.90
Total valid votes		55,216		
Registered electors		96,180		▲9.63
CPI gain from INC		Swing	▲1.92	

=== Assembly Election 1978 ===
1978 Maharashtra Legislative Assembly election : Parner
Party	Candidate	Votes	%	±%
INC	Shankarrao Kale	19,781	34.00%	▼17.33
CPI	Thube Prabhakar Appaji	18,537	31.86%	New
JP	Bhagar Dattatraya Kondaji	17,447	29.99%	New
INC(I)	Babanrao Bapurao Sobale	2,040	3.51%	New
Independent	Murlidhar Bhaurao Pawar	372	0.64%	New
Margin of victory		1,244	2.14%	▼0.52
Turnout		60,267	68.69%	▲5.43
Total valid votes		58,177		
Registered electors		87,733		▲5.86
INC hold		Swing	▼17.33	

=== Assembly Election 1972 ===
1972 Maharashtra Legislative Assembly election : Parner
Party	Candidate	Votes	%	±%
INC	Shankarrao Kale	25,900	51.33%	▲2.44
Independent	Bhagat Dattatrya Kondiram	24,560	48.67%	New
Margin of victory		1,340	2.66%	▼3.49
Turnout		52,520	63.37%	▲10.53
Total valid votes		50,460		
Registered electors		82,879		▲8.45
INC hold		Swing	▲2.44	

=== Assembly Election 1967 ===
1967 Maharashtra Legislative Assembly election : Parner
Party	Candidate	Votes	%	±%
INC	N. T. Gunjal	18,814	48.89%	▲20.24
CPI	S. T. Auty	16,451	42.75%	▲17.82
Independent	P. G. Auty	2,226	5.78%	New
ABJS	D. K. Rohokale	990	2.57%	New
Margin of victory		2,363	6.14%	▲2.42
Turnout		40,254	52.67%	▲3.41
Total valid votes		38,481		
Registered electors		76,422		▲31.79
INC hold		Swing	▲20.24	

=== Assembly Election 1962 ===
1962 Maharashtra Legislative Assembly election : Parner
Party	Candidate	Votes	%	±%
INC	Dattatraya Koundiram Bhagat	7,800	28.65%	▼0.3
CPI	Bhaskar Tukaram Auti	6,787	24.93%	New
Independent	Kashinath Balwantrao Khilari	5,998	22.03%	New
PSP	Namadeo Ranoji Gunjal	4,701	17.27%	New
Independent	Daulatrao Keshavrao Auty	1,339	4.92%	New
Independent	Bhimaji Baburao Auty	596	2.19%	New
Margin of victory		1,013	3.72%	▼38.38
Turnout		29,034	50.07%	▲5.68
Total valid votes		27,221		
Registered electors		57,988		▲17.08
INC gain from Independent		Swing	▼42.40	

=== Assembly Election 1957 ===
1957 Bombay State Legislative Assembly election : Parner
Party	Candidate	Votes	%	±%
Independent	Bhaskar Tukaram Auti	14,519	71.05%	New
INC	Chavan Ramrao Marutirao	5,916	28.95%	New
Margin of victory		8,603	42.10%	
Turnout		20,435	41.26%	
Total valid votes		20,435		
Registered electors		49,529		
Independent win (new seat)				
