= Shibalapur =

- village
- Location in Maharashtra, India
- Coordinates: 19°49′42″N 74°36′09″E
- Country: India
- State: Maharashtra
- District: Ahmednagar
- Taluka: Sangamner

Government
  - Type: Panchayati raj
  - Body: Grampanchayat

Population (2011)
  - Total: 3,081

Languages
  - Official: Marathi
- Time zone: UTC+5:30 (IST)
- PIN: 413738
- Telephone code: 02425
- Vehicle registration: MH-17

Shibalapur is a village in Sangamner taluka of the Ahmednagar district in Maharashtra, India. The village is known for its temples, particularly Bhairavnath Temple and Shahashibali Baba Temple. The village is 35 km from Shirdi, a town known as the home of Shri Sai Baba.

== Population ==
As per 2011 census, population of village is 3081, of which 1588 are males and 1493 are females.

== Economy ==
Main occupation of village resident is agriculture and allied works. The primary crops of the village are sugar cane, wheat and cotton.

== Transport ==
=== Road ===
Shibalapur is connected to nearby villages Ashwi kd, Pimpri Louki, Shedgao and Panodi by village roads.

=== Bus ===
Sangamner is the nearest Bus Stand to a village.

=== Rail ===
Shrirampur (Belapur) is the nearest railway station to a village.

=== Air ===
Shirdi Airport is the nearest airport to a village.

== See also ==
- List of villages in Sangamner taluka
