= Auti =

Auti may refer to:

- Auti Angel, American entertainer
- Vijayrao Bhaskarrao Auti, Indian Shiv Sena politician
- Bhaskar Tukaram Auti (fl. 1950s), Indian politician
- ʻAutī, evergreen flowering plant in the Asparagus family

== See also ==
- Audi
- Autti
