= Kanoli =

- village
- Location in Maharashtra, India Kanoli (India)
- Coordinates: 19.5291°N 74.295°E
- Country: India
- State: Maharashtra
- District: Ahmadnagar
- Taluka: Sangamner

Government
  - Body: Village Panchayat

Languages
  - Official: Marathi
- Time zone: UTC+5:30 (IST)
- PIN: 422605
- Lok Sabha constituency: Shirdi
- Vidhan Sabha constituency: Sangamner

Kanoli is a small village located in Maharashtra, India, in Sangamner tehsil of Ahmadnagar district. The nearest town is Sangamner, located approximately 16 km to the northwest.

Kanoli has a population of approximately 3,600. It is part of the Shirdi assembly and parliamentary constituency.
