= Kopargaon Lok Sabha constituency =

Former constituency of the Indian parliament in Maharashtra

Coordinates: 19.9°N 74.5°E

Kopargaon
- Former Lok Sabha constituency

Constituency details
- Country: India
- Region: Western India
- State: Maharashtra
- Established: 1952
- Abolished: 2009
- Reservation: None

Kopargaon was a Lok Sabha parliamentary constituency of Maharashtra.

== Members of Parliament ==
Year	Member	Party
1952	Pandarinath Kanavade Patil	Indian National Congress
1957	Babu C Kamble	Independent
1962	Annasaheb Shinde	Indian National Congress
1967	Annasaheb Shinde	Indian National Congress
1971	Balasaheb Vikhe Patil	Indian National Congress
1977	Balasaheb Vikhe Patil	Indian National Congress
1980	Balasaheb Vikhe Patil	Indian National Congress (I)
1984	Balasaheb Vikhe Patil	Indian National Congress
1989	Balasaheb Vikhe Patil	Indian National Congress
1991	Shankarrao Kale	Indian National Congress
1996	Bhimrao Badade	Bharatiya Janata Party
1998	Prasad Tanpure	Indian National Congress
1999	Balasaheb Vikhe Patil	Shiv Sena
2004	Balasaheb Vikhe Patil	Indian National Congress
2008 onwards : See Shirdi Lok Sabha constituency

== Election results ==
=== 2004 ===
2004 Indian general elections: Kopargaon
Party	Candidate	Votes	%	±%
INC	Balasaheb Vikhe Patil	356,688		
SS	Bhanudas Kashinath Murkute	2,69,357		
Margin of victory		87,331		
Turnout		6,68,700		
INC gain from SS		Swing		

=== General elections 1999 ===
1999 Indian general elections: Kopargaon
Party	Candidate	Votes	%	±%
SS	Balasaheb Vikhe	253,498	38.82%	
NCP	Gulabrao Sakharam Shelke	2,06,083	31.56%	
INC	Govindrao Wamanrao Adik	1,77,643	27.21%	
Majority		47,415	5.94	
Turnout		6,52,938	72.30%	
SS gain from INC		Swing		

=== General elections 1998 ===
1998 Indian general election: Kopargaon
Party	Candidate	Votes	%	±%
INC	Prasad Tanpure	435,730	56.29%	
BJP	Bhimrao Badade	2,56,490	43.00%	
Majority		47,415	5.94	
Turnout		5,96,427	64.85%	
INC gain from BJP		Swing		

=== General elections 1996 ===
1996 Indian general election: Kopargaon
Party	Candidate	Votes	%	±%
BJP	Bhimrao Badade	243,543	47.81%	
INC	Shankarrao Kale	2,23,292	43.83%	
Majority		20,251	5.94	
Turnout		5,09,427	56.33%	
BJP gain from INC		Swing		

=== General elections 1991 ===
1991 Indian general election: Kopargaon
Party	Candidate	Votes	%	±%
INC	Shankarrao Kale	311,367	63.40%	
BJP	Vasantrao Sakharam Gunjal	1,38,910	28.28%	
CPI	Babasaheb Appasaheb Thube	32,225	6.56%	
Majority		1,72,457		
Turnout		4,91,144	57.10%	
INC hold		Swing		

=== General elections 1989 ===
1989 Indian general election: Kopargaon
Party	Candidate	Votes	%	±%
INC	Balasaheb Vikhe	248,106	49.73%	
BJP	Vasantrao Sakharam Gunjal	1,27,048	25.47%	
CPI	A. P. Kadu	1,13,911	22.83%	
Majority		1,21,058		
Turnout		4,98,865	59.99%	
INC hold		Swing		

=== General elections 1984 ===
1984 Indian general election: Kopargaon
Party	Candidate	Votes	%	±%
INC	Balasaheb Vikhe	217,982	57.60%	
CPI	Madhavrao Bayaji Gaikwad	1,46,497	38.71%	
Majority		71,485		
Turnout		3,78,438	58.60%	
INC hold		Swing		

=== General elections 1980 ===
1980 Indian general election: Kopargaon
Party	Candidate	Votes	%	±%
INC	Balasaheb Vikhe	281,221	67.36%	
INC(U)	Annasaheb Pandurang Shinde Patil	1,21,382	29.07%	
Majority		1,59,839		
Turnout		3,78,438	58.60%	
INC(I) gain from INC		Swing		

=== General elections 1977 ===
1977 Indian general election: Kopargaon
Party	Candidate	Votes	%	±%
INC	Balasaheb Vikhe	181,013	66.88%	
BLD	Kishore Rameshwar Pawar	82,469	30.47%	
Majority		98,544		
Turnout		2,70,656	54.42%	
INC hold		Swing		

=== General elections 1971 ===
1971 Indian general election: Kopargaon
Party	Candidate	Votes	%	±%
INC	Balasaheb Vikhe	179,492	60.68%	
CPI	Punjaji Bapuji Kadu	1,10,050	37.20%	
Majority		69,442		
Turnout		2,95,819	59.69%	
INC hold		Swing		

=== General elections 1967 ===
1967 Indian general election: Kopargaon
Party	Candidate	Votes	%	±%
INC	Annasaheb Pandurang Shinde Patil	138,774	46.27%	
CPI	Punjaji Bapuji Kadu	1,23,812	41.28%	
ABJS	V. S. Chandekar	37,323	12.44%	
Majority		14,962		
Turnout		2,99,909	65.94%	
INC hold		Swing		

=== General elections 1962 ===
1962 Indian general election: Kopargaon
Party	Candidate	Votes	%	±%
INC	Annasaheb Pandurang Shinde Patil	122,057	53.48%	
RPI	Yashwant Ambedkar	55,527	24.33%	
Independent	Damodhar Tatyaba Rupwate	50,626	22.18%	
Majority		66,530		
Turnout		2,28,210	60.63%	
INC hold		Swing		

=== General elections 1957 ===
1957 Indian general election: Kopargaon
Party	Candidate	Votes	%	±%
Independent	Bapu Chandrasen Kamble	92,501	64.43%	
INC	Pandharinath Ramchandra Kanawade	51,072	35.57%	
Majority		41,429		
Turnout		1,43,573	43.87%	
Independent gain from INC		Swing		

=== General elections 1952 ===
1952 Indian general election: Kopargaon
Party	Candidate	Votes	%	±%
INC	Pandharinath Ramchandra Kanawade	102,300	55.59%	
CPI	Jagannath Kanoji Kakde	42,935	23.33%	
Socialist	Gangadhar Janardan Ogale	38,789	21.08%	
Majority		59,365		
Turnout		1,84,024	46.64%	
INC win (new seat)				

== See also ==
- Kopargaon
- Shirdi Lok Sabha constituency
- List of constituencies of the Lok Sabha
