= Mega ATV Championship =

- Type: Adventure Racing
- Country: India
- Inaugural Session: 2015
- Organised By: Autosports India
- No Of Teams Participated: 140+

Session 1
- Track Length: 3.2 km
- Location: Bhubaneswar, Odisha
- Teams participated: 60+
- Winner: Northern Bulls

Session 2
- Track Length: 5.6 km
- Location: Ahmednagar, Maharashtra
- Teams participated: 70+
- Winner: Stallions Racing

Mega ATV Championship is a national level ATV (All terrain vehicles) racing championship in India organized by "Autosports India". It is inter college national level racing championship for engineering students basically for mechanical/ automobile branches. This championship is well known for its extraordinary racing format, night endurance racing. Till date 4 seasons held and the third season to be held in March 2020. The championship started its first season in 2015 held in Bhubaneswar.

== Event format ==
It is a four-day design, manufacturing, and racing competition. Where in day one the technical inspection of the vehicles to be done, and from day 2, the event starts which consists of drag race, flat dirt race, endurance race, armageddon race, black out race.

== Tracks ==
One Rocky Mountains track in Ahmednagar, Maharashtra situated at Dr. Vitthalrao Vikhe Patil College Of Engineering campus of length 6 Kilometers, Spread over 300 Acres.

Another track on flat dirt ground in Bhubaneswar, Odisha length 3.2 Kilometers, spread over 62 Acres.

== Season-1 ==
Held in Bhubaneswar, Odisha, participants from many technical colleges and universities in India participated in the championship. One flat dirt track in Bhubaneswar Patia it is 3.2 Kilometers, long and on the flat ground of perfectly square shape of 600 meters x600 meters.

Position	College Name	Team Name
Champion	Rayat Institute of Engineering & Information Technology	Northern Bulls
Runners Up	Kumaraguru College of Technology	Team Blitzkrieg
2nd Runners Up	Sri Krishna College of Engineering & Technology	Transryderz

== Season-2 ==
The season-2 of Mega ATV Championship received a huge response from the participants and well appreciated after end of season-1. Season-2 held at Maharashtra state in Ahmednagar District, In Dr. Vitthalrao Vikhe Patil College of engineering campus. The track was on mountains and of a length of 6 Kilometers. The track is spread over 300 Acres of total land area.

=== Category Wise ===
Category	1st	2nd	3rd
Flat Dirt Race	Team jatayu	Stallions Racing	Team Sparkx
Drag Race	Team Red Baron	Team Jatayu	Stallions Racing
Armageddon Race	Stallions Racing	Team Red Baron	Team Jatayu
Blackout Race	Team Red Baron	Stallions Racing	Team Sparkx
Endurance Race	Team Red Baron	Stallions Racing	Team Sparkx

== Overall results ==
Position	College Name	Team Name
Champion	Alard College Of Engineering, Pune	Stallions Racing
Runners Up	Pimpri Chinchwad College of Engineering	Team Red Baron
2nd Runners Up	Maharaja Agrasen Institute of Technology	Team Jatayu

== Season-3 ==
Mega ATV Championship season 3 was conducted in Nasik, Maharashtra in February, 2018. The event was spread over an area of whopping 210 acres with the longest track being 7 kilometres in length. It saw the participation of a engineering undergrads and was a successful event.

=== Category Wise ===
Category	1st	2nd	3rd
Flat Dirt Race	Prometheans	Team Jatayu	Team Chronicles
Drag Race	Team Mechcrew	Phoenix Racing	Team Brahmastra Racing
Armageddon Race	Team Brahmastra Racing	Team SparkX	Prometheans
Endurance Race	Team SparkX	Team Durgayans	Team Kriegers Racing

== Overall results ==
Position	College Name	Team Name
Champion	Silver Oak College of Engineering and Technology	Team SparkX
Runners Up	Thiagarajar College Of Engineering	Prometheans
2nd Runners Up	K. K. Wagh Institute of Engineering Education and Research	Team Brahmastra Racing

== Season-4 ==
Mega ATV Championship season 4 was conducted on a plateau near Qureim beach, Goa, Maharashtra. The event was spread over a surprising 955 acres with the longest track being 9.5 kilometers in length for Endurance race. The event first time reached the maximum participation limit of 100 comprising more than 3500 engineers and attracted an overall spectators of 10,000+ strength.

=== Category Wise ===
Category	1st	2nd	3rd
Flat Dirt Race	TEAM RACING PIONEERS	Team Assassins	JUNKYARD WARRIORS
Drag Race	RedShift Racing India	TEAM DELTA GENESIS	Team Blackhawks
Armageddon Race	TEAM RACING PIONEERS	Team SparkX	Team Invader Racing
Endurance Race	TEAM RACING PIONEERS	TEAM DELTA GENESIS	Team Mavrick

== Overall results ==
Position	College Name	Team Name
Champion	Zeal College of Engineering and Research	TEAM RACING PIONEERS
Runners Up	Sandip Institute of Engineering And Management	TEAM DELTA GENESIS
2nd Runners Up	Silver Oak College of Engineering and Technology	Team SparkX

== Season- 5 & 6 ==
Mega ATV Championship Season 5 & 6 was conducted on a plateau in Qureim beach, Goa, Maharashtra. The event was spread over a surprising 1000 acres with the longest track being 8.5 kilometers in length for Endurance race.

=== Category Wise ===
Category	1st	2nd	3rd
Flat Dirt Race	Team Phoenix	Team Assassins	Team Bruiser Heads
Drag Race	Team Torrid Racing	Team Synergy Racing	Team SparkX Racing
Armageddon Race	Team SparkX Racing	Team Bruiser Heads	Team Phoenix
Endurance Race	Team Assassins	Team Torrid Racing	Team Bruiser Heads

== Overall results ==
Position	College Name	Team Name
Champion	Gokaraju Rangaraju Institute of Engineering Technology	Team Bruiser Heads
Runners Up	R.C.Patel Institute of Technology, Shirpur	Team Assassins
2nd Runners Up	Silver Oak College of Engineering and Technology	Team SparkX
