= Yesgaon =

Village in Maharashtra

Yesgaon is a village in Kopargaon taluka (tahsil), Ahmednagar district, Maharashtra, India.

Award-winning village with Adarsh gaon, green village, 100, coral free village. Smart Village

Village has school, hall, gram Panchayat, Sai lawns, Banks, Complex

== Economy ==
Most people of Yesgaon are Traders and farmers. Popular crops are sugarcane, wheat, and onions.

Its Pincode is 423603. Its STD code is 02423.

== Notable people ==
- Shankarrao Genuji Kolhe, Member of the Legislative Assembly (MLA) and Minister in Government of Maharashtra

- Balasaheb K Nikole, ( Ho. SARPANCH ) Sanjay K Nikole, Amol S Nikole, ( Sai lawns)
