= Bhimrao Badade =

Indian politician

Member of Parliament, Lok Sabha
- In office 1996–1998
- Preceded by: Shankarrao Kale
- Succeeded by: Prasad Tanpure
- Constituency: Kopargaon

Personal details
- Born: 1 August 1947 (age 79) Malegaon Thadi, Kopargaon, Ahmednagar district
- Party: Bharatiya Janata Party
- Spouse: Bhagyashri (m. 1977)
- Children: 1 son, 2 daughters
- Parent: Vishnu Badade (father)
- Education: Bachelor of Arts; Bachelor of Laws
- Profession: Advocate, Politician

Bhimrao Vishnuji Badade (born August 1, 1947, in Makegaonthai, Kopergaon) is an Indian politician and member of the Bharatiya Janata Party. Badade was a member of the 11th Lok Sabha in 1996 from the Kopargaon constituency assembly constituency in Maharashtra.
