= Snehalata Kolhe =

Indian politician

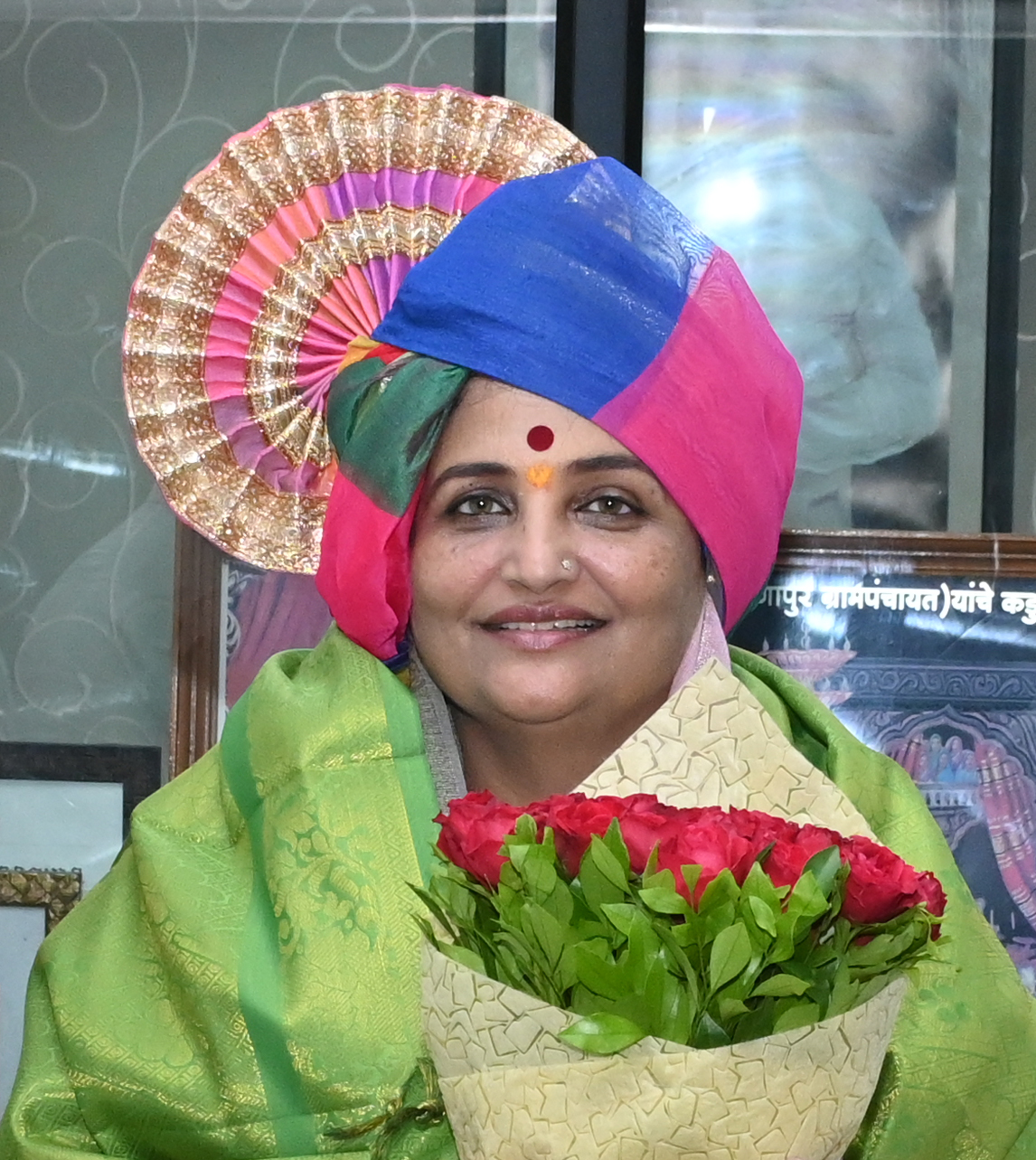

Member of the Legislative Assembly (MLA)
- In office 2014–2019
- Constituency: Kopargaon

Personal details
- Born: 8 October 1971
- Party: Bhartiya Janta Party (BJP)
- Spouse: Bipindada Shankarrao Kolhe
- Education: B.A.

Snehalata Bipindada Kolhe, is an Indian politician, social worker, and member of the Bharatiya Janata Party (BJP). She served as the first female Member of the Legislative Assembly (MLA) for the Kopargaon constituency in Maharashtra, after winning the 2014 Maharashtra Legislative Assembly election. She also held the position of State Secretary for the BJP in Maharashtra. Kolhe hails from a prominent political family, being the daughter-in-law of Shankarrao Genuji Kolhe, a former minister in Maharashtra.

== Early life and education ==
Snehalata Kolhe was born on October 8, 1971. She completed a Bachelor of Arts (B.A.) degree in 1998, grounding her in a strong educational foundation. Her marriage into the Kolhe family further connected her with a tradition of leadership and service, particularly through her father-in-law, Shankarrao Genuji Kolhe.

== Political career ==
In 2014, Snehalata Kolhe contested the Maharashtra Legislative Assembly election from the Kopargaon constituency and emerged victorious, becoming the first woman to represent Kopargaon as an MLA. She worked to address key regional issues, including healthcare, infrastructure, and education. However, in the 2019 Maharashtra Legislative Assembly election, she was defeated by Ashutosh Ashokrao Kale of the Nationalist Congress Party (NCP).

As a former State Secretary of the BJP in Maharashtra, Snehalata Kolhe’s role within the party highlighted her dedication to its mission and her influence in state politics..

== Contributions and Social Initiatives ==
Aside from her legislative work, Snehalata Kolhe is known for her involvement in social initiatives, particularly those focusing on rural development, women’s empowerment, and healthcare. Her commitment to promoting education and economic self-reliance for women has been impactful and widely respected in her constituency.

== Legacy ==
Snehalata Kolhe’s was the first female MLA of Kopargaon and a former State Secretary of the BJP. She did not win in 2019, her contributions to the Kopargaon constituency and Maharashtra politics have left a lasting impact on her community.
