= Nilesh Dnyandev Lanke =

Indian politician

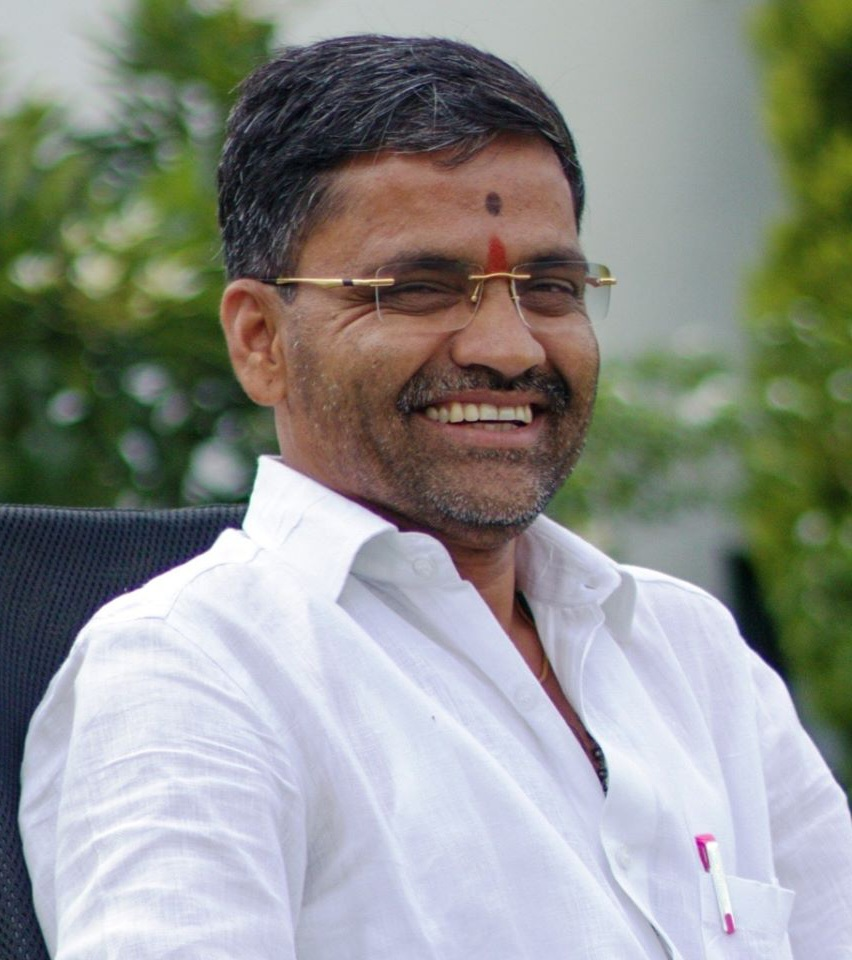

Member of Parliament, Lok Sabha
- Incumbent
- Assumed office 04 June 2024
- Constituency: Ahilyanagar

Member of Maharashtra Legislative Assembly
- In office 2019–2024
- Preceded by: Vijayrao Auti
- Succeeded by: Kashinath Date
- Constituency: Parner

Personal details
- Born: 10 March 1980 (age 46) Hanga, Parner
- Party: Nationalist Congress Party – Sharadchandra Pawar
- Spouse: Ranitai Nilesh Lanke
- Website: https://mlanileshlanke.in

Nilesh Dnyandev Lanke is an Indian politician. He is a Member of the Nationalist Congress Party (Sharadchandra Pawar). In 2019, he was elected MLA of the Parner Assembly constituency in Maharashtra. In the 2024 Lok Sabha election, he won from Ahmednagar constituency and was elected as a member of parliament for the first time.

== Early life ==
His hometown is Hanga village, located in Parner. He earned a BA in Political Science from Yashvantrao Chavan Open University Nashik in May 2016. He is also called Nete.

== Positions held ==
- 2019: Elected to Maharashtra Legislative Assembly.
- 2024: Elected to the Lok Sabha from Ahmednagar.
- 2024: Member of parliamentary committee on energy

== Controversies ==
Nilesh Lanke has been involved in several controversies during his career. On August 20, in a leaked audio it came forward that Nilesh Lanke harassed Jyoti Deware to such an extent that Jyoti Deware felt suicidal. Before that Nilesh Lanke came into news for hitting a health worker. Later the worker retracted his statement under pressure.
