= Prasad Tanpure =

Indian politician

Prasad alias Bapusaheb Tanpure

Member of Maharashtra Legislative Assembly
- In office (1980-1985),(1985-1990),(1990-1995),(1995-1998),(1999 – 2004)
- Preceded by: Pawar Kashinanth Laxman
- Succeeded by: Chandrasekhar Kadam
- Constituency: Rahuri Assembly constituency

Member of parliament, Lok Sabha
- In office 1998–1999
- Preceded by: Bhimrao Badade
- Succeeded by: Balasaheb Vikhe Patil
- Constituency: Kopargaon Lok Sabha constituency

Personal details
- Born: 21 July 1942 (age 83) At.Rahuri, Dist.Ahmednagar district
- Party: Nationalist Congress Party (1999–present)
- Other political affiliations: Indian National Congress (1980-1999)
- Spouse: Smt. Usha Prasad Tanpure
- Children: one daughter & Son (Prajakt Tanpure)
- Parent: Shri.Baburao Bapuji Tanpure
- Education: B.Sc.(Hons.) Educated at University of Poona, Pune (Maharashtra)
- Occupation: Agriculturist & Politician

Bapusaheb alias Prasadrao Baburao Tanpure (born 21 July 1942) is an Indian politician who was a member of the 12th Lok Sabha representing the Kopargaon constituency. He belongs to the Nationalist Congress Party.
