= Shankarrao Genuji Kolhe =

Indian politician (1929–2022)

Shankarrao Kolhe

Member of Maharashtra Legislative Assembly (MLA)
- In office (1972–1978)
- Preceded by: Mohanrao Absaheb Gade
- Succeeded by: Chandrabhan Bhausaheb Ghogare
- Constituency: Shirdi
- In office (1978-1980), (1980 – 1985)
- Succeeded by: Dadasaheb Shahji Rohamare
- In office (1990-1995), (1995-1999), (1999 – 2004)
- Preceded by: Dadasaheb Shahji Rohamare
- Succeeded by: Ashokrao Shankarrao Kale
- Constituency: Kopargaon

Personal details
- Born: 24 March 1929 Yesgaon, Ahmednagar District, British Raj
- Died: 16 March 2022 (aged 92) Nashik, Maharashtra, India
- Party: Nationalist Congress Party
- Spouse: Sindhutai Kolhe
- Children: 4(3 Son (Nitindada Kolhe, Bipindada Kolhe, Dr. Milinddada Kolhe); 1 Daughter (Nilima Pawar))
- Education: B.Sc in Agriculture
- Alma mater: Pune University

Shankarrao Genuji Kolhe (24 March 1929 – 16 March 2022) was an Indian politician and the Member of the Legislative Assembly (MLA) and a minister in Government of Maharashtra.

== Early life and education ==
Kolhe was born Yesgaon village, now in Kopargaon taluka, Ahmednagar district, Maharashtra. He attended Pune University to earn a B.Sc in Agriculture. He received a Ford Foundation scholarship to receive additional training in the United States and Europe. In 1953, he travelled to Salt Lake City, Utah as an agricultural education program trainee.

== Career ==
=== Political career ===
Kolhe began his political career as a sarpanch in 1950 and moved up to the state minister post. He was elected as an independent to the Maharashtra Legislative Assembly in 1972. As a state minister he handled revenue (1991), transport (1992) portfolios. He was a perennial political opponent of the Vikhe-Patil family.

In 1970s, he led farmers March to Reserve Bank of India, Mumbai to demand a reduction in interest rates on loan to farmers.

He served as the vice-chairman of the Shri Saibaba Sansthan Trust, Shirdi from 2004 to 2012. He was on the executive committee of Rayat Shikshan Sanstha.

=== Cooperative sector work ===
Kolhe was known for his work in the cooperative sector. His work started in 1953 when he formed a taluka-level cooperative (Kopargaon Taluka Vikas Mandal) in Kopargaon to aid farmers.

In 1963, he founded the cooperative sugar factory Sahakar Maharshi Shankarrao Kolhe Sahakari Sakhar Karkhana Ltd. (previously The Sanjivani (Takli) Sahakari Sakhar Karkhana Ltd.) near Sahajanand Nagar, Shingnapur in Kopargaon. He also started the National Heavy Engineering Co-operative Ltd. in Pune, Godavari (Khore) Co-operative Milk Society (1976),

== Death ==
Kolhe died in Nashik on 16 March 2022 at the age of 92.
