= Ashutosh Ashokrao Kale =

Indian politician (born 1985)

Ashutosh Kale
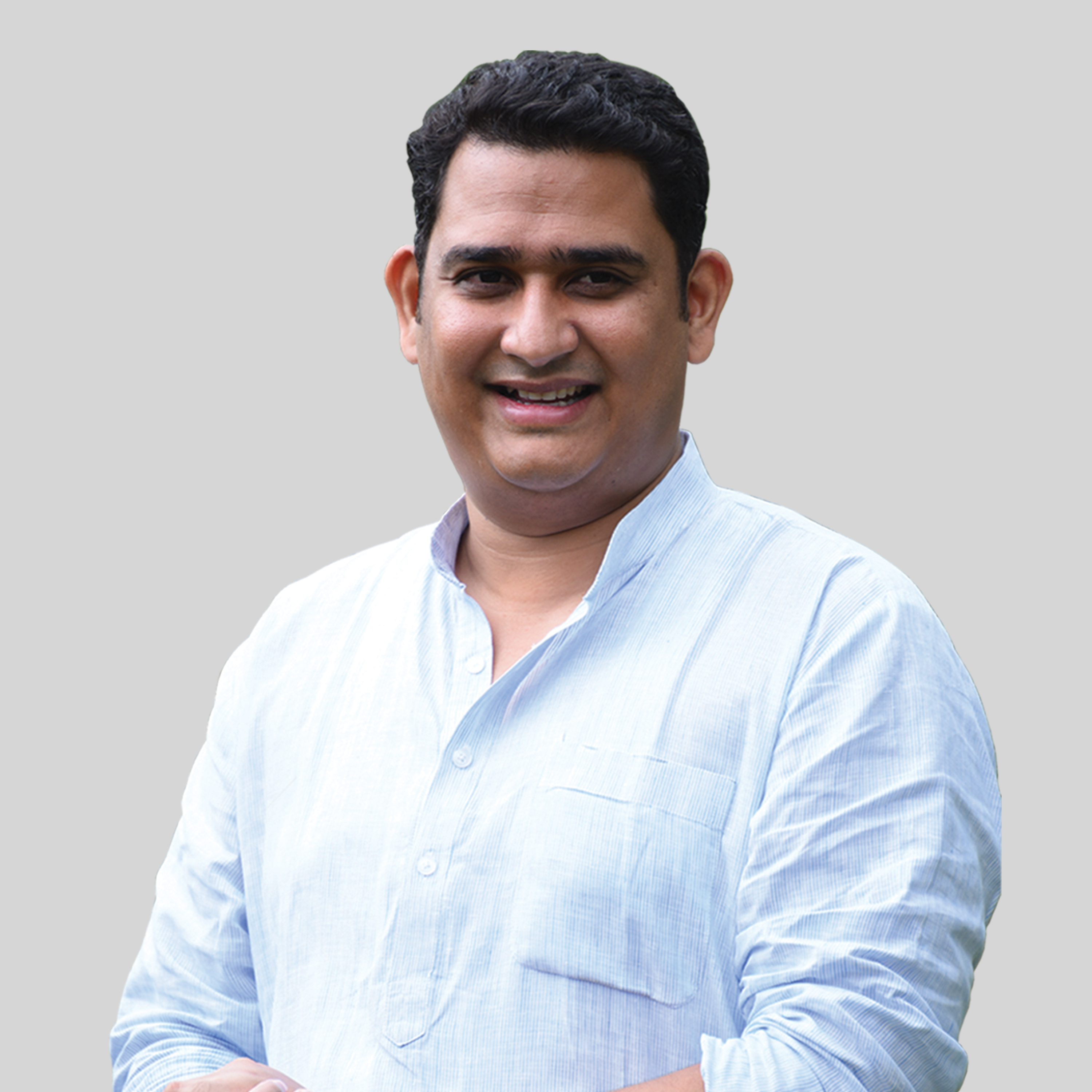

Member of the Maharashtra Legislative Assembly
- In office 24 October 2019 - Present
- Preceded by: Snehalata Bipindada Kolhe Patil
- Constituency: Kopargaon

Personal details
- Born: 4 August 1985 (age 40) Mahegaon Deshmukh, Kopargaon Maharashtra
- Party: Nationalist Congress Party (Ajit Pawar) (2023-present)
- Occupation: Farmer, politician, & social activist

Ashutosh Ashokrao Kale is a member of the Maharashtra Legislative Assembly from the Kopargaon constituency in Maharashtra, India and former chairman of Shri Saibaba Sansthan Trust, Shirdi. He is also Chairman of the Karmaveer Shankarrao Kale Co-operative sugar factory.

== Early life and family ==
Ashutosh Kale was born to ex. MLA Mr. Ashokrao Kale and Mrs. Pushpatai Kale in Mahegaon Deshmukh, Tal: Kopargaon, Maharashtra on 4 August 1985. Grandson of ex. MP Shankarrao Kale. He completed his schooling from Gautam Public School Kolpewadi, Tal: Kopargaon & Sanjeevan Vidyalaya Pachagani. He graduated in "Bachelor of Engineering" studies from University of Pune and Master of Science from Northeastern University, Boston. Ashutosh Kale is married to Mrs. Chaitali Ghule – Kale and has two sons Ayansh and Aarsh.

== Political career ==
Ashutosh Kale started his social activity with raising voice for farmers rights in Kopargaon since 2013. He is fighting for various issues of farmers and citizens of Kopargaon. In October 2019, he contested and won the seat from the Kopargaon (Vidhan Sabha constituency) during the 2019 Maharashtra Legislative Assembly election and also became the third generation member of the Kale family to win the election. Due to his dedication to his work he got elected as a chairman of Shri Saibaba Sansthan Trust, Shirdi and Chairman of North region of Rayat Shikshan Sanstha.

As a chairman of Karmaveer Shankarrao Kale Co-operative sugar factory, Kale claimed credit for making the factory loss-free within 5 years.

== See also ==
- Shankarrao Kale
