= Ashwi Khurd =

Village in Maharashtra

Coordinates: 19.5152909°N 74.3592452°E

Ashwi Khurd is a village in Sangamner taluka, Ahmednagar district, Maharashtra, India. It is 74.4 km (46.2 mi) from its district main city Ahmednagar, 156 km (97 mi) from Pune and 240 km (150 mi) from state capital Mumbai. The nearest towns are Akole (20.8 km [12.9 mi]), Rahata (33.7 km [20.9 mi]), Kopargaon (45.8 km [28.5 mi]), and Shrirampur (47.9 km [29.8 mi]).

== Notable people ==
Indian cricketer Ajinkya Rahane was born in the village.
