= Ahmednagar Taluka-Parner Assembly constituency =

Constituency of the Maharashtra legislative assembly in India

Ahmednagar Taluka-Parner
- Former constituency for the Maharashtra Legislative Assembly

Constituency details
- Country: India
- Region: Western India
- State: Maharashtra
- Established: 1952
- Abolished: 1952
- Total electors: 60,743

Ahmednagar Taluka-Parner Assembly constituency was an assembly constituency in the India state of Maharashtra. After 1952 election it was split into Ahmednagar North Assembly constituency and Ahmednagar South Assembly constituency.

== Members of the Legislative Assembly ==
Election	Member	Party
1952	Bhaskar Tukaram Auti	Communist Party of India

== Election results ==
=== Assembly Election 1952 ===
1952 Bombay State Legislative Assembly election : Ahmednagar Taluka-Parner
Party	Candidate	Votes	%	±%
CPI	Bhaskar Tukaram Auti	12,570	56.67%	New
INC	Bhagat Dattatraya Kundiram	9,612	43.33%	New
Margin of victory		2,958	13.34%	
Turnout		22,182	36.52%	
Total valid votes		22,182		
Registered electors		60,743		
CPI win (new seat)				
