= Shirdi Assembly constituency =

Constituency of the Maharashtra legislative assembly in India

Coordinates: 19.76°N 74.48°E

Shirdi
- Constituency No. 218 for the Maharashtra Legislative Assembly

Constituency details
- Country: India
- Region: Western India
- State: Maharashtra
- District: Ahmednagar
- Lok Sabha constituency: Shirdi
- Established: 1956
- Total electors: 293,252
- Reservation: None

Member of Legislative Assembly
- 15th Maharashtra Legislative Assembly
- Incumbent Radhakrishna Vikhe Patil
- Party: BJP
- Alliance: NDA
- Elected year: 2024

Shirdi Assembly constituency is one of the 288 Vidhan Sabha (Legislative Assembly) constituencies of Maharashtra in Western India. It comes under Shirdi Lok Sabha constituency. Shri Radhakrishna Vikhe Patil is the 8-time consecutive and undefeated MLA from Shirdi Assembly constituency winning by record margins since 1995.

== Overview ==
Shirdi (constituency number 218) is one of the twelve Vidhan Sabha constituencies located in Ahmednagar district. It comprises part of Rahata tehsil and part of Sangamner tehsil of the district.

Shirdi is part of Shirdi Lok Sabha constituency along with five other Vidhan Sabha constituencies in this district, namely Akole, Sangamner, Kopargaon, Shrirampur and Nevasa.

== Members of Legislative Assembly ==
Year	Member	Party
1957	Bhaskarrao Sadashiv Galande; Pawar Arjun Giri	Independent politician
1962	Karbhari Bhimaji Rohamare	Indian National Congress
1967	Mohanrao Abasaheb Gade	Independent politician
1972	Shankarrao Genuji Kolhe	Independent politician
1978	Chandrabhan Bhausaheb Ghogare Patil	Indian National Congress
1980	Annasaheb Sarangdhar Mhaske Patil	Indian National Congress (I)
1985	Annasaheb Sarangdhar Mhaske Patil	Indian National Congress
1990	Annasaheb Sarangdhar Mhaske Patil	Indian National Congress
1995	Radhakrishna Vikhe Patil	Indian National Congress
1997 By-election	Radhakrishna Vikhe Patil	Shiv Sena
1999	Radhakrishna Vikhe Patil	Shiv Sena
2004	Radhakrishna Vikhe Patil	Indian National Congress
2009	Radhakrishna Vikhe Patil	Indian National Congress
2014	Radhakrishna Vikhe Patil	Indian National Congress
2019	Radhakrishna Vikhe Patil	Bharatiya Janata Party
2024	Radhakrishna Vikhe Patil	Bharatiya Janata Party

== Election results ==
=== Assembly Election 2024 ===
2024 Maharashtra Legislative Assembly election : Shirdi
Party	Candidate	Votes	%	±%
BJP	Radhakrishna Vikhe Patil	144,778	65.11	▼6.36
INC	Prabhavati Janardan Ghogare Patil	74,496	33.50	▲9.04
Independent	Dr. Rajendra Madanlal Pipada	1,510	0.68	New
NOTA	None of the Above	1,121	0.50	▼0.36
Margin of victory		70,282	31.61	▼15.40
Turnout		2,23,471	76.20	▲5.45
Total valid votes		2,22,350		
Registered electors		2,93,252		▲11.48
BJP hold		Swing	▼6.36	

=== Assembly Election 2019 ===
2019 Maharashtra Legislative Assembly election : Shirdi
Party	Candidate	Votes	%	±%
BJP	Radhakrishna Vikhe Patil	132,316	71.48	▲62.44
INC	Suresh Jagannath Thorat	45,292	24.47	▼39.03
VBA	Vishal Baban Kolage	5,788	3.13	New
NOTA	None of the Above	1,596	0.86	▲0.24
Margin of victory		87,024	47.01	▲7.97
Turnout		1,86,777	71.00	▼6.00
Total valid votes		1,85,122		
Registered electors		2,63,057		▲5.03
BJP gain from INC		Swing	▲7.97	

=== Assembly Election 2014 ===
2014 Maharashtra Legislative Assembly election : Shirdi
Party	Candidate	Votes	%	±%
INC	Radhakrishna Vikhe Patil	121,459	63.50	▲10.78
SS	Abhay Dattatraya Shelke Patil	46,797	24.47	▼19.52
BJP	Rajendra Bhausaheb Gondkar	17,283	9.04	New
NCP	Shekhar Bhaskarrao Borhade	3,188	1.67	New
BSP	Jagtap Simon Thakaji	1,230	0.64	▼0.08
NOTA	None of the Above	1,193	0.62	New
Margin of victory		74,662	39.03	▲30.30
Turnout		1,92,481	76.85	▲4.94
Total valid votes		1,91,271		
Registered electors		2,50,457		▲17.47
INC hold		Swing	▲10.78	

=== Assembly Election 2009 ===
2009 Maharashtra Legislative Assembly election : Shirdi
Party	Candidate	Votes	%	±%
INC	Radhakrishna Vikhe Patil	80,301	52.72	▼26.98
SS	Dr. Rajendra Madanlal Pipada	66,992	43.99	▲23.69
Independent	Sunil Bhagwan Sandanshiv	1,537	1.01	New
BSP	Balasaheb Bhaskar Aware	1,102	0.72	New
Margin of victory		13,309	8.74	▼50.68
Turnout		1,52,441	71.50	▲2.40
Total valid votes		1,52,306		
Registered electors		2,13,215		▲23.24
INC hold		Swing	▼26.98	

=== Assembly Election 2004 ===
2004 Maharashtra Legislative Assembly election : Shirdi
Party	Candidate	Votes	%	±%
INC	Radhakrishna Vikhe Patil	95,204	79.71	▲65.75
SS	Gadekar Dhanjay Shravan	24,237	20.29	▼28.41
Margin of victory		70,967	59.42	▲46.57
Turnout		1,19,447	69.04	▼0.09
Total valid votes		1,19,441		
Registered electors		1,73,010		▲14.67
INC gain from SS		Swing	▲31.00	

=== Assembly Election 1999 ===
1999 Maharashtra Legislative Assembly election : Shirdi
Party	Candidate	Votes	%	±%
SS	Radhakrishna Vikhe Patil	50,799	48.70	▼7.51
NCP	Mhaske Raosaheb Nathaji	37,399	35.86	New
INC	Dr. Gondkar Eknath Bhagchand	14,557	13.96	▼28.83
CPI	Vikhe Patil Khandu Kisanrao	688	0.66	New
Margin of victory		13,400	12.85	▼0.58
Turnout		1,09,056	72.28	▼2.90
Total valid votes		1,04,301		
Registered electors		1,50,879		▲4.33
SS hold		Swing	▼7.51	

=== Assembly By-election 1997 ===
1997 Maharashtra Legislative Assembly by-election : Shirdi
Party	Candidate	Votes	%	±%
SS	Radhakrishna Vikhe Patil	58,557	56.21	▲24.00
INC	Deokar Ravindra Marutirao	44,568	42.78	▼17.42
Margin of victory		13,989	13.43	▼14.56
Turnout		1,06,049	73.33	▼2.21
Total valid votes		1,04,170		
Registered electors		1,44,622		▼1.34
SS gain from INC		Swing	▼3.99	

=== Assembly Election 1995 ===
1995 Maharashtra Legislative Assembly election : Shirdi
Party	Candidate	Votes	%	±%
INC	Radhakrishna Vikhe Patil	65,516	60.20	▲7.77
SS	Gadekar Dhanjay Shravan	35,055	32.21	▲21.56
BBM	Vikhe Rajashree Bhausaheb	4,056	3.73	New
Independent	Cholke Subhash Harikisan	2,167	1.99	New
Doordarshi Party	Patil Balu Narayan	779	0.72	▲0.28
Margin of victory		30,461	27.99	▲7.65
Turnout		1,12,467	76.73	▲14.36
Total valid votes		1,08,828		
Registered electors		1,46,583		▲0.31
INC hold		Swing	▲7.77	

=== Assembly Election 1990 ===
1990 Maharashtra Legislative Assembly election : Shirdi
Party	Candidate	Votes	%	±%
INC	Annasaheb Sarangdhar Mhaske Patil	45,886	52.43	▲0.30
JD	Eknath Chandrabhan Ghogare Patil	28,089	32.10	New
SS	Suhas Vasantarao Vahadne	9,318	10.65	New
BSP	Nikale Vinayakarao Marutrao	2,801	3.20	New
Margin of victory		17,797	20.34	▲13.67
Turnout		89,147	61.00	▼11.56
Total valid votes		87,516		
Registered electors		1,46,137		▲31.63
INC hold		Swing	▲0.30	

=== Assembly Election 1985 ===
1985 Maharashtra Legislative Assembly election : Shirdi
Party	Candidate	Votes	%	±%
INC	Annasaheb Sarangdhar Mhaske Patil	41,353	52.13	New
IC(S)	Raosaheb Nathaji Mhaske	36,069	45.47	New
Independent	Dhausaheb Sakharam Dhapatakar	595	0.75	New
RPI	Jagtap Sopan Bhagwat	477	0.60	New
Margin of victory		5,284	6.66	▼26.14
Turnout		80,949	72.91	▲11.31
Total valid votes		79,326		
Registered electors		1,11,025		▲11.50
INC gain from INC(I)		Swing	▼9.98	

=== Assembly Election 1980 ===
1980 Maharashtra Legislative Assembly election : Shirdi
Party	Candidate	Votes	%	±%
INC(I)	Annasaheb Sarangdhar Mhaske Patil	37,193	62.11	▲51.33
INC(U)	Bhaskarrao Ramkrishana Jadhav	17,552	29.31	New
BJP	Suryabhan Vahadane-Patil	3,463	5.78	New
Independent	Mhaske Yashvant Rama	510	0.85	New
Independent	Nibe Laxman Murlidhar	507	0.85	New
Margin of victory		19,641	32.80	▲15.95
Turnout		61,528	61.79	▼8.11
Total valid votes		59,883		
Registered electors		99,571		▲12.08
INC(I) gain from INC		Swing	▲11.19	

=== Assembly Election 1978 ===
1978 Maharashtra Legislative Assembly election : Shirdi
Party	Candidate	Votes	%	±%
INC	Chandrabhan Bhausaheb Ghogare Patil	30,874	50.92	▲6.12
JP	Annasaheb Sarangdhar Mhaske Patil	20,656	34.07	New
INC(I)	Kote Bajirao Tatyaji	6,533	10.77	New
Independent	Bansode Ahilaji Bhimaji	2,569	4.24	New
Margin of victory		10,218	16.85	▲9.14
Turnout		63,091	71.02	▼5.95
Total valid votes		60,632		
Registered electors		88,840		▼10.65
INC gain from Independent		Swing	▼1.59	

=== Assembly Election 1972 ===
1972 Maharashtra Legislative Assembly election : Shirdi
Party	Candidate	Votes	%	±%
Independent	Shankarrao Genuji Kolhe	38,745	52.51	New
INC	Rohamare Karbhari Bhimaji	33,052	44.80	▲5.49
ABJS	Chandare Yashwant Shankar	1,552	2.10	New
Margin of victory		5,693	7.72	▼7.78
Turnout		75,689	76.12	▲4.52
Total valid votes		73,781		
Registered electors		99,431		▲20.62
Independent hold		Swing	▼2.29	

=== Assembly Election 1967 ===
1967 Maharashtra Legislative Assembly election : Shirdi
Party	Candidate	Votes	%	±%
Independent	Mohanrao Abasaheb Gade	31,482	54.81	New
INC	Shankarrao Kale	22,581	39.31	▼24.19
RPI	P. J. Roham	2,285	3.98	New
Independent	D. J. Gavali	590	1.03	New
Independent	M. M. Nikale	505	0.88	New
Margin of victory		8,901	15.50	▼11.50
Turnout		61,225	74.27	▲1.40
Total valid votes		57,443		
Registered electors		82,432		▲24.62
Independent gain from INC		Swing	▼8.69	

=== Assembly Election 1962 ===
1962 Maharashtra Legislative Assembly election : Shirdi
Party	Candidate	Votes	%	±%
INC	Karbhari Bhimaji Rohamare	28,679	63.50	▲41.99
Independent	Mohanrao Abasaheb Gade	16,486	36.50	New
Margin of victory		12,193	27.00	▲22.60
Turnout		47,431	71.71	▼33.24
Total valid votes		45,165		
Registered electors		66,145		▼36.31
INC gain from Independent		Swing	▲33.21	

=== Assembly Election 1957 ===
1957 Bombay State Legislative Assembly election : Shirdi
Party	Candidate	Votes	%	±%
Independent	Galande Bhaskarrao Sadashiv	31,931	30.29	New
Independent	Pawar Arjun Giri (Sc)	27,295	25.89	New
INC	Abnawe Maruti Namdeo (Sc)	22,672	21.51	New
INC	Rohamare Karbhari Bhimaji	20,692	19.63	New
Independent	Pote Dharma Ganapati (Sc)	2,835	2.69	New
Margin of victory		4,636	4.40	
Turnout		1,05,425	101.52	
Total valid votes		1,05,425		
Registered electors		1,03,847		
Independent win (new seat)				

== See also ==
- Shirdi
- List of constituencies of Maharashtra Vidhan Sabha
