= Kashinath Mahadu Date =

Indian politician

Member of the Maharashtra Legislative Assembly
- Incumbent
- Assumed office 23 November 2024
- Preceded by: Nilesh Dnyandev Lanke
- Constituency: Parner

Member of Ahmednagar Zilha Parishad
- In office 2017–2022

Personal details
- Party: NCP
- Spouse: NA
- Occupation: Politician

Kashinath Mahadu Date Sir (born 1954) is an Indian politician from Maharashtra who was elected as a Member of the Legislative Assembly from Parner Vidhan Sabha constituency in Ahmednagar.

== Early life and education ==
Date is from Parner, Ahmednagar District, Maharashtra. He is the son of Mahadu Narayan Date. He completed his B.A. in 1976 at New Arts Commerce and Science College, Ahmednagar, which is affiliated with Pune University.

== Career ==
Date is a former member of Zilha Parishad, Ahmednagar. He served as chairman of the Agriculture and Animal Husbandry Committee of Zilha Parishad, Ahmednagar.

He won from Parner Assembly constituency representing Nationalist Congress Party in the 2024 Maharashtra Legislative Assembly election. He received 113,630 votes and defeated his nearest rival Rani Nilesh Lanke of the Nationalist Congress Party (Sharadchandra Pawar) by a margin of1,526 votes.
