= Balasaheb Vikhe Patil =

Indian politician

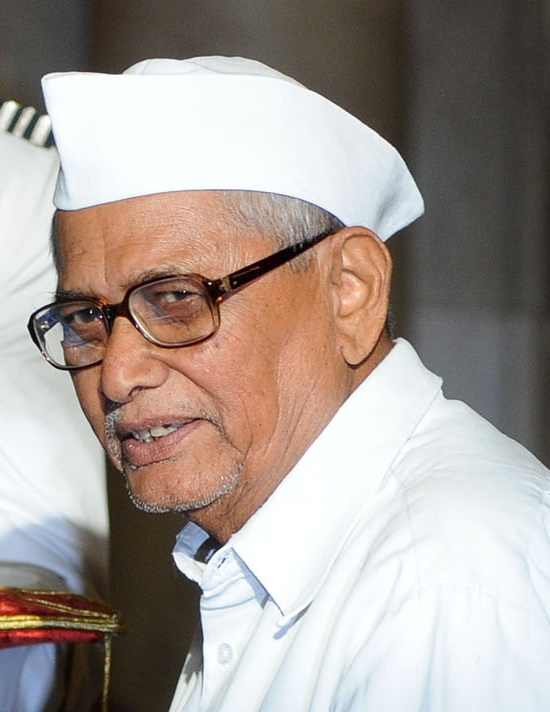
- Patil in 2010

Union Minister of Heavy Industries and Public Enterprises
- In office 1 July 2002 – 24 May 2003
- Prime Minister: Atal Bihari Vajpayee
- Preceded by: Suresh Prabhu
- Succeeded by: Subodh Mohite

Union Minister of State for Finance
- In office 13 October 1999 – 1 July 2002
- Prime Minister: Atal Bihari Vajpayee
- Preceded by: V. Dhananjay Kumar
- Succeeded by: Anant Geete

Member of Parliament, Lok Sabha
- In office 6 October 1999 – 17 May 2009
- Preceded by: Prasad Tanpure
- Succeeded by: Constituency abolished
- Constituency: Kopargaon
- In office 10 March 1998 – 26 April 1999
- Preceded by: Maruti Devaram Shelke
- Succeeded by: Dilip Kumar Gandhi
- Constituency: Ahmednagar
- In office 21 March 1971 – 21 June 1991
- Preceded by: Annasaheb Shinde
- Succeeded by: Shankarrao Kale
- Constituency: Kopargaon

Personal details
- Born: 10 April 1932 Ahmednagar, Maharashtra
- Died: 30 December 2016 (aged 84) Loni, Pravaranagar (District Ahmednagar), Maharashtra
- Party: Indian National Congress
- Other political affiliations: Shivsena
- Spouse: Sindhutai
- Children: 5 including Ashok Vikhe Patil, Radhakrishna Vikhe Patil & Rajendra Vikhe Patil,
- Parent: Vithalrao Vikhe Patil (father)
- Awards: Padma Bhushan (2010)

Eknathrao, alias Balasaheb Vithalrao Vikhe Patil (10 April 1932 – 30 December 2016), was an Indian politician and former Minister of Heavy Industries and Public Enterprises and Minister of state of Finance in Government of India. He served as a Member of Parliament of Lok Sabha variously representing Kopargaon and Ahmednagar. He was a member of the Indian National Congress but later joined Shivsena. He was appointed Pro-tem Speaker of 14th Lok Sabha.

== Political career ==
He was a prominent political leader in Maharashtra. He was a Minister in the Third Vajpayee Ministry. He served seven terms as a Lok Sabha MP representing Kopargaon and Ahmednagar. He won his Lok Sabha seat in 1998 as a candidate for Shiv Sena. As a supporter of the NDA government he was appointed Minister of State in Ministry of Finance (India) and later on appointed Minister of Heavy Industries and Public Enterprises in the Government of India. He rejoined the Indian National Congress in 2004.

== Early life ==
He was the eldest son of Vithalrao Vikhe Patil, who started Asia's first Co-operative sugar factory at Loni in Maharashtra.

== Awards ==
- The Jeevan Sadhana Gaurav Award from Pune University for lifetime achievement in the field of education and rural development in 2007
- Padma Bhushan by Government of India on 31 March 2010 for his outstanding work in the field of Social Work.
- D.Sc - Doctor of Science Award awarded in the year 2013 by Mahatma Phule Krishi Vidyapeeth, Rahuri.
