= Vithalrao Vikhe Patil =

Indian industrialist (1897–1980)

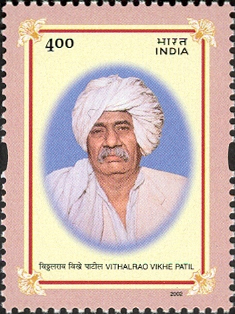
- Patil on a 2002 stamp of India
- Born: 29 August 1901; Loni, Ahmednagar, Maharashtra, India
- Died: 27 April 1980 (aged 78)
- Occupation: Industrialist
- Children: Balasaheb Vikhe Patil
- Awards: Padma Shri

Vithalrao Eknathrao Vikhe Patil was an Indian industrialist, the founder of the first sugar factory in the cooperative sector in India at Loni, in Maharashtra and the founder of a group of industries and institutions composed of Institute of Business Management and Rural Development, Padmashri Dr. Vithalrao Vikhe Patil Foundation's Medical College and Hospital and Padmashri Dr. Vitthalrao Vikhe Patil Sahakari Sakhar Karkhana Limited, operating under Padmashree Dr. Vithalrao Foundation. The Government of India honoured him in 1961, with the award of Padma Shri, the fourth highest Indian civilian award for his services to the nation. His son, Balasaheb Vikhe Patil, was a recipient of the Padma Bhushan, a member of parliament and a former minister.

Dr. Vikhe Patil founded schools for weaker sections of society, promoting education and social empowerment. His vision and leadership transformed Pravaranagar, creating opportunities for economic growth and development.

== See also ==
- Balasaheb Vikhe Patil
- Radhakrishna Vikhe Patil
