= Vijayrao Bhaskarrao Auti =

Indian politician

17th Deputy Speaker of Maharashtra Legislative Assembly
- In office 30 November 2018 – 9 November 2019
- Preceded by: Vasant Purke
- Succeeded by: Narhari Sitaram Zirwal

Member of Maharashtra Legislative Assembly
- In office 2004–2019
- Constituency: Parner

Personal details
- Party: Shiv Sena
- Relations: Aniket Auti (Son)

Vijayrao Bhaskarrao Auti is a leader of Shiv Sena. He has served office as a Deputy Speaker of Maharashtra Legislative Assembly in the year 2018–2019. He had been elected for three consecutive terms to the Maharashtra Legislative Assembly for 2004, 2009 and 2014. Vijay Auti is the son of Bhaskarrao Auti, freedom fighter and ex-MLA from Parner. Ravi Gaikwad, Commissioner, RTO,Government of Maharashtra, is his nephew, son of his elder sister Pushpa Gaikwad.

== Positions held ==
- 2004: Elected to Maharashtra Legislative Assembly (1st term)
- 2009: Re-Elected to Maharashtra Legislative Assembly (2nd term)
- 2014: Re-Elected to Maharashtra Legislative Assembly (3rd term)
- 2015: Upvidhan (उपविधान) Samiti Pramukh Maharashtra Vidhan Mandal
- 2018: Elected as Deputy Speaker of Maharashtra Legislative Assembly

== See also ==
- Ahmednagar Lok Sabha constituency
