= Sangamner taluka =

- Tehsil
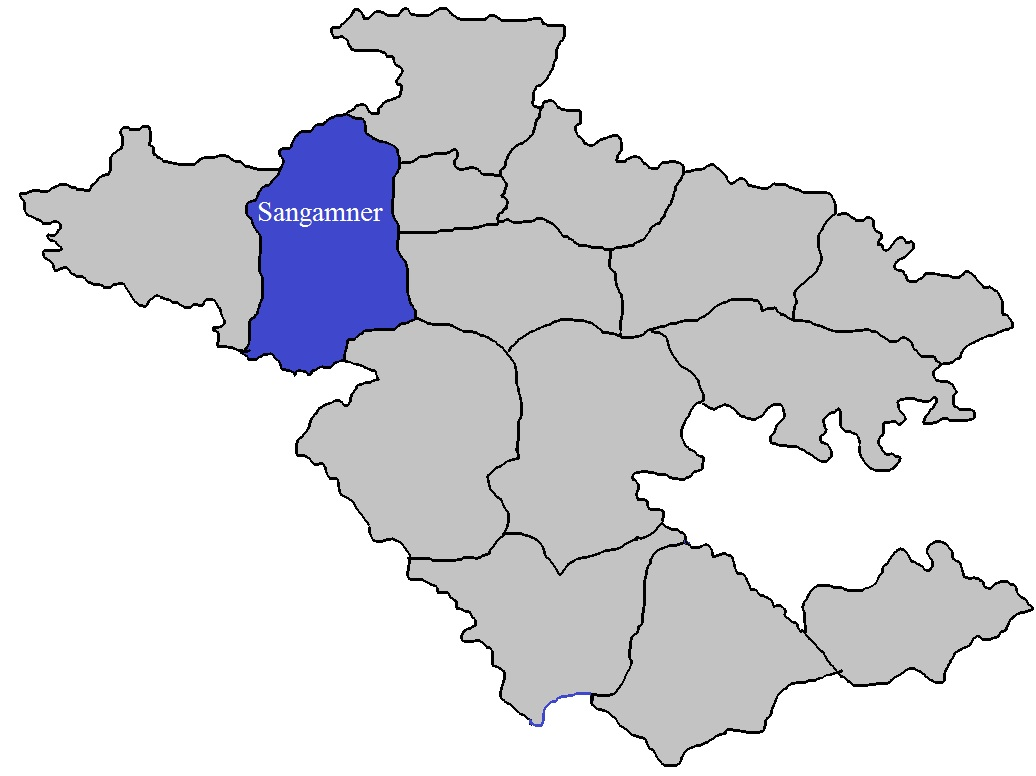
- Location of Sangamner in Ahmednagar district in Maharashtra
- Country: India
- State: Maharashtra
- District: Ahilyanagar
- Headquarters: Sangamner

Government
  - Lok Sabha constituency: Shirdi (Lok Sabha constituency)
  - Assembly constituency: Sangamner (Vidhan Sabha constituency)
  - MLA: Shree. Amol Khatal

Area
  - Tehsil: 1,705.06 km^{2} (658.33 sq mi)

Population (2011)
  - Tehsil: 487,939
  - Density: 286.171/km^{2} (741.180/sq mi)
  - Urban: 87,664

Demographics
  - Literacy rate: 65.21
- Rain: 416 mm
- Website: Official website

Sangamner taluka, is a taluka in Sangamner subdivision of Ahilyanagar district in Maharashtra state of India.

== Area ==
The table below shows area of the taluka by land type.

Type of Land	Area (km^{2})	% of Total Area
Agriculture	1202.9	70.55
Forest	194.89	11.43
Other	307.27	18.02
Total	1705.06	100

== Villages in Sangamner ==
There are at least 172 villages in Sangamner taluka. For list of villages see Villages in Sangamner taluka.

== Population ==
Religions in Sangamner taluk (2011)
Religion	Percent
Hinduism	91.65%
Islam	7.24%
Other or not stated	1.11%

Sangamner taluka has a population of 487,939 according to the 2011 census. Sangamner had a literacy rate of 79.96% and a sex ratio of 943 females per 1000 males. 87,664 (17.97%) lived in urban areas. Scheduled Castes and Scheduled Tribes make up 8.36% and 10.59% of the population respectively.

Languages of Sangamner taluk (2011)
1. Marathi (90.1%)
2. Urdu (4.00%)
3. Hindi (3.26%)
4. Others (2.66%)

At the time of the 2011 Census of India, 90.08% of the population in the district spoke Marathi, 4.00% Urdu and 3.26% Hindi as their first language.

== Rain Fall ==
The Table below details of rainfall from year 1981 to 2004.

Year	Rainfall (mm)
1981	459
1982	315
1983	363
1984	204
1985	204
1986	260
1987	306
1988	461
1989	558
1990	445
1991	450
1992	342
1993	435
1994	416.6
1995	290
1996	566
1997	402
1998	489
1999	348
2000	528
2001	337
2002	459
2003	380
2004	570
2005	200
2006	169
2007	225

== Notable people ==
- Indurikar Maharaj - comedian kirtankar, and social educator
- Ajinkya Rahane, Indian cricketer born at Ashwi Khurd village, Sangmner on 6 June 1988.

== See also ==
- Talukas in Ahmednagar district
