= Ajinkya Rahane =

Indian cricketer (born 1988)

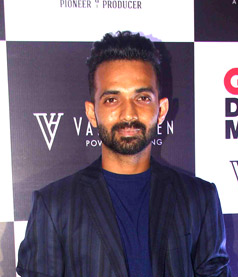
- Rahane in 2016

Personal information
- Full name: Ajinkya Madhukar Rahane
- Born: 6 June 1988 (age 38); Ashwi Khurd, Maharashtra, India
- Batting: Right-handed
- Bowling: Right-arm off spin
- Role: Batter

International information
- National side: India (2011–2023)
- Test debut (cap 278): 22 March 2013 v Australia
- Last Test: 20 July 2023 v West Indies
- ODI debut (cap 191): 3 September 2011 v England
- Last ODI: 16 February 2018 v South Africa
- ODI shirt no.: 27
- T20I debut (cap 39): 31 August 2011 v England
- Last T20I: 28 August 2016 v West Indies
- T20I shirt no.: 27

Domestic team information
- Years: Team
- 2006/07–2025/26: Mumbai
- 2008–2009: Mumbai Indians
- 2011–2015, 2018-2019: Rajasthan Royals
- 2016–2017: Rising Pune Supergiant
- 2019: Hampshire
- 2020–2021: Delhi Capitals
- 2022, 2025–2026: Kolkata Knight Riders
- 2023–2024: Chennai Super Kings
- 2024: Leicestershire
- 2026: Amsterdam Flames

Career statistics
Competition	Test	ODI	T20I	FC
Matches	85	90	20	205
Runs scored	5,077	2,962	375	14,209
Batting average	38.46	35.26	20.83	44.96
100s/50s	12/26	3/24	0/1	42/59
Top score	188	111	61	265*
Catches/stumpings	102/-	48/–	16/–	228/–
Medal record
Men's Cricket
Representing India
ICC T20 World Cup
Runner-up	2014 Bangladesh
ICC Champions Trophy
Runner-up	2017 England and Wales
ICC World Test Championship
Runner-up	2019-2021
Runner-up	2021-2023
ACC Asia Cup
Winner	2016 Bangladesh
- Source: ESPNcricinfo, 25 September 2026

Ajinkya Madhukar Rahane (born 6 June 1988) is a former Indian professional cricketer and also captained the India national cricket team in all three formats. He formerly played for and captained Mumbai in domestic cricket. He played primarily as a middle-order batsman in the Test format and as a top-order batsman in white-ball forms of the game. India lost only one match under his captaincy.

Rahane made his first-class debut in 2007–08 Ranji Trophy season for Mumbai. He made his international debut in a Twenty20 International against England at Manchester in August 2011 and his Test debut in March 2013 against Australia. His first Test century came at the Basin Reserve, Wellington against New Zealand. Under his captaincy, India won the 2020-21 Border–Gavaskar Trophy in Australia.

On 30 July 2026, Rahane announced his retirement from all forms of professional cricket.

== Early and personal life ==
Ajinkya Madhukar Rahane was born on 6 June 1988 in Ashwi Khurd, Maharashtra, to Madhukar Baburao Rahane and Sujata Rahane. His ancestral village is Chandanapuri in Sangamner taluka of Ahmednagar district. He has a younger brother and sister, Shashank and Apurva Rahane. At the age of seven, Madhukar Rahane took Rahane to a small coaching camp with a matting wicket in Dombivli, as they could not afford proper coaching. From the age of 17, he took coaching from former India batsman Pravin Amre. Ajinkya bats and bowls off break with his right hand but uses his left hand to write. Rahane cleared his Secondary School Certificate from SV Joshi High School, Dombivli.

Rahane married Radhika Dhopavkar, his childhood friend, on 26 September 2014. The couple welcomed their first child, daughter Aarya, on 4 October 2019. Their second child, boy Raghav, was born on 5 October 2022.

== Domestic career ==
Rahane had performed well when India U-19 toured New Zealand in early 2007, with two centuries. He was picked for the Mohammad Nissar Trophy in Pakistan.

=== First-class career ===
Rahane made his first-class debut, at the age of 19, for Mumbai against Karachi Urban in the Mohammad Nissar Trophy in September 2007, at Karachi, when most of the first-choice Mumbai players were unavailable for various reasons. Opening the innings with Sahil Kukreja, he scored a century on debut 143 (207), with Kukreja scoring 110 for a total of 247. Rahane was subsequently picked for the Irani Trophy match against Rest of India.

Rahane scored 172 against England Lions for West Zone in the 2007–08 Duleep Trophy.

Rahane, with 1089 runs in his second Ranji season (2008–09), was a crucial factor in Mumbai's 38th title win. His score of 265 not-out (batting at no. 3 for Mumbai) came against Hyderabad at Rajiv Gandhi International Stadium, Uppal in the 2009–10 season and also tournament. Rahane surpassed 1000 runs in three separate seasons, and scoring 152 in the 2011 Irani Trophy match against Rajasthan helped him get selected for India's Test squad.

In April 2019, Rahane joined Hampshire as their overseas player for two months of the season.

=== List A career ===
Rahane made his List A debut for Mumbai against Delhi for the Vijay Hazare Trophy in March 2007. He contributed 61 runs to a 171-run partnership with former Indian opener Wasim Jaffer.

Rahane progressed through the Mumbai ranks and had also been a part of the Indian U-19 team and the India A. Rahane had also turned out for India Blue and India Green in the NKP Salve Challenger Trophy.

In September 2018, Rahane was named as the captain of Mumbai for the 2018–19 Vijay Hazare Trophy tournament. In October 2018, he was named as the captain of India C's squad for the 2018–19 Deodhar Trophy. He led the team to the final and played a crucial knock of 144* in the final to win the title.

In the 2023–24 season, Rahane led Mumbai team for Ranaji Trophy to victory. In the finals, Mumbai defeated Vidarbha by 169 runs. He scored 7 and 73 in this match. His personal form remained poor in this tournament.

== International career ==
=== Test career ===
Rahane was selected in the Test squad to play against West Indies in November 2011. Rahane was taken in the squad for 16 months and in his presence, he saw seven players make their debuts. His performance in the limited-overs cricket (ODI and T20I) during that period was not up to the mark, as he averaged around 25 in both ODI and T20I cricket, and struggled for form in the series against Pakistan and England (in January 2013).

Rahane made his Test debut on 22 March 2013 against Australia in the Border-Gavaskar Trophy at Delhi's Feroz Shah Kotla Stadium. Rahane was handed his India Test cap which brought an end to a lean patch for Mumbai, who had not produced a Test player for India since May 2007. Two single-digit scores in the game prompted many to question Rahane's ability to handle pressure and replicate his domestic success at international level.

Despite his failure in the debut match, Rahane was included in the playing eleven for the first match of India's tour of South Africa (2013–14). Batting in the lower-middle order, he made 209 runs at an average of 69.66 in the series (including a 96 off 157 balls at Kingsmead, Durban) against the bowling attack comprising Dale Steyn, Morne Morkel and Vernon Philander. "For a man who had spent many a tour and series warming up the bench, carrying drinks, wondering when his opportunity will come, he has taken his chance with both hands, even though it arrived in the most difficult of conditions to bat in", cricket pundit Sidharth Monga wrote. Rahane finished as India's third-highest run-getter in the series, but he was in the most precarious position of all before the series began.

Rahane made his first Test ton at Basin Reserve, Wellington, New Zealand, on 15 February 2014 against New Zealand. India were in a difficult position when Rahane came to the crease at 156 for five and by the time he departed with 118 India were in a match-winning position ruined by Brendon McCullum's famous triple-century. "He had a mountain of first-class runs backing him, of course, but did he have what goes around by the queer name of X-factor? Did he have that extra edge in his game and personality that separates top-class international players from the rest? Was he merely humble, or was he unable to assert himself, unable to absorb real pressure? After his first two Test tours to South Africa and New Zealand, we can safely conclude it must be the former. Underneath that seemingly soft exterior lurks a solid Test batsman, and he was on display at the Basin Reserve", ESPNcricinfo wrote in their analysis.

Rahane played in the Investec Test Series (India tour of England, 2014) in England. His previous overseas performances (in away Tests, Rahane averaged 61.83 having scored 299 in four Tests including a century and two fifties) earned him a place in the playing eleven over Rohit Sharma. He justified his selection by making his second century at the second Test match at Lord's Cricket Ground. Put in to bat on a green-top wicket by Alastair Cook, India collapsed to 140 for six by tea, only to be rescued by Rahane's century. He was supported by Bhuvneshwar Kumar, who scored a valuable 36, besides putting on 90 runs for the eighth wicket. In the process, Rahane became the fourth Indian batsman to post a Test century on his first appearance at Lord's, joining Sourav Ganguly, Dilip Vengsarkar and Ajit Agarkar.

Rahane played in the 2014–15 Border-Gavaskar Trophy in Australia. In the third Test match at Melbourne, Rahane made his third Test hundred. He made 399 runs in four, including a century and two half-centuries against the opposition attack of Mitchell Johnson and Ryan Harris, the core of a bowling unit that famously won 2013–14 Ashes series 5–0.

In the first Test of 2015 tour of Sri Lanka, Rahane broke the world record for most catches in a Test match with eight. In the second Test at PSS, Colombo, he scored his fourth Test hundred, scoring 126 in India's second innings, and India went on to win the match. In the process, he reached his career-best ranking of 20th, at the ICC Player Rankings.

Rahane played in the 2015 Freedom Series. In the 4th test match at New Delhi, Rahane made centuries in both the innings on a pitch where most batsmen found it difficult to score, and with this feat, he became only the fifth Indian to join the elite club of twin centurions in a single test.

On 16 August 2016, Rahane achieved his career best test batsmen's ranking of No. 8.

On 25 March 2017, Rahane became India's 33rd Test Captain when he led the team in the 4th test against Australia in Dharamsala due to an injury to Virat Kohli. He scored 46 runs in his first innings and quick 37 Runs in 2nd innings as India's Test captain. He scored a century in Sri Lanka in August 2017. In the return series at home, he failed miserably scoring only 17 in 5 innings. Despite an overseas average of 55, he was not included in the playing 11 for the 1st and 2nd Test against South Africa in 2018. After the failures of Rohit Sharma in both tests, the Indian vice-captain was brought back into the playing eleven for the 3rd test where his innings of 48 in the 2nd innings on a dangerous batting pitch proved very crucial in setting up an Indian victory. He led the Indian Team in the test match against Afghanistan national cricket team in the absence of Virat Kohli in 2018. In the India's tour of England, Rahane scored two half centuries, a match winning 81 in the third test and 51 in the fourth test. In the following India's tour of Australia, Rahane scored two half centuries; a match-winning 70 in the Adelaide test and a 51 in the Perth test. Overall, he finished the series with 217 runs.

In 2019 two Match series in West Indies, he scored a century in the First Test to guide India to victory. In the home series against South Africa, he scored a brisk fifty in second Test in Pune sharing a crucial century partnership with skipper Virat Kohli. In the third Test, he scored a match winning 115 with a 267 run partnership with Rohit Sharma who scored his first double century in Tests rescuing the team from 39 for 3.

On 15 November 2019, in the first innings of the first test match against Bangladesh, Rahane hit 86 off 172 deliveries, crossing the boundary 9 times. This became his 21st test fifty in international cricket.

He was selected in the Test eleven for a 2 match series against New Zealand in February 2020, but like the rest of the team, his batting performance was not up to the mark.

In December 2020 he was made captain of the Indian team for the final three matches of India's tour of Australia in place of Virat Kohli, who was taking paternity leave. In the second test, Rahane scored 112 in the first innings and 27* in the second innings and guided India to a 8 wicket victory and was awarded man of the match. After drawing the third test at Sydney, India went on to win the fourth test in Brisbane and handed Australia their first Test defeat at The Gabba in 32 years with Rahane contributing to the winning cause with a quick fire 24 runs off 22 balls in the second innings and India winning the series 2–1. He finished the series as the third highest run getter with 268 runs at an average of 38.28. He received high praise from the critics and pundits for his captaincy and leading India to one of their greatest Test series win despite losing out on many of the first team players due to injury and bouncing back strongly after the first Test defeat.

Rahane was appointed as the captain of the Indian team for the first Test against New Zealand in November 2021, as Kohli had been rested. Rahane has captained in 6 Tests, out of which 4 won and 2 drawn. In the second test against New Zealand, he was dropped from India playing 11 due to a hamstring injury. Despite poor form throughout 2021, he was selected in the playing 11 in the first two test matches of the South African tour. This decision received a lot of criticism, especially since Shreyas Iyer was sidelined and had scored a hundred on debut. Many critics urged to drop him after his golden duck in the 2nd test. In the tour of South Africa 2021–22, Rahane finished the series with 136 runs and only one half-century. Despite a decent performance in Ranji Trophy 2022, he was not selected for a 2-match home series against Sri Lanka, and he was made to sit on the benches 5 times overall in his Test career.

=== One-Day International career ===
Two back to back centuries in the Emerging Players Tournament in Australia (201) helped Rahane secure a place in the India limited-overs squad for the tour of England. He made his debut against England at Chester-le-Street as a replacement for opener Virender Sehwag. Although Rahane made 40 runs at strike-rate of 90.90, India's hopes of their first victory of the 2011 summer against England were thwarted by a washout at Chester-le-Street.

He did well in his maiden international series (2011 NatWest Series), against England in England, and in the return series. He made a 47 ball 54 on his second match of the latter tour. Rahane failed to impress in his next few limited over matches against West Indies, Sri Lanka, Pakistan and England.

Rahane made his second ODI fifty in 2013-14 Asia Cup, only to be followed by another slump. In a short ODI career in the middle order, Rahane has seemed unsure and struggled at times to find the balance between defence and attack. He showed signs of comfort at the top of the order with rapid centuries against England (September 2014) and Sri Lanka (November 2014), but Rohit Sharma's second ODI double-century followed by a big hundred against Australia at the MCG pushed Rahane back to the middle order. In the ICC Cricket World Cup followed, Rahane only managed to score 208 runs from 8 matches, with an average of 34.66. He was dropped by Mahendra Singh Dhoni in the second ODI against Bangladesh but after the series, he was appointed as captain of India for its tour of Zimbabwe for ODIs and T20Is in 2015 when a second string squad was selected. India won that ODI series 3–0, although Rahane was not able to leave any big impacts with the bat, he made a total of 112 in three matches with only one half-century in it.

=== T20I career ===
Rahane made his international debut for India in a Twenty20 International against England at Old Trafford Cricket Ground, Manchester in August 2011. He scored a half-century on this match (61 of 39) against an England attack comprising Stuart Broad, Graeme Swann and Tim Bresnan. The match was the only T20I played by former Indian captain Rahul Dravid.

Rahane was part of Indian team make it to the final of 2014 World T20. After sitting on the bench for the first three matches he got a chance to play against Australia where he scored 19 runs. He gave India a good start in the semi-final scoring 32 runs as India went on to win the Match. He also captained India in the two Twenty20 International against Zimbabwe, winning the first and losing the second match. He scored 33 and 4 runs in those matches.

== List of international centuries ==
Rahane has scored 12 centuries in Test matches and three in ODIs. His highest Test score of 188 came against New Zealand at Indore in October 2016. His highest ODI score of 111 came against Sri Lanka at Cuttack in November 2011. He has not scored a Twenty20 International century.

List of Test centuries
No.	Score	Against	Pos.	Inn.	Test	Venue	H/A/N	Date	Result	Ref
1	118	New Zealand	7	2	2/2	Basin Reserve, Wellington	Away	14 February 2014	Drawn	
2	103	England	5	1	2/5	Lord's, London	Away	17 July 2014	Won	
3	147	Australia	5	2	3/4	Melbourne Cricket Ground, Melbourne	Away	26 December 2014	Drawn	
4	126	Sri Lanka	3	3	2/3	P Sara Oval, Colombo	Away	20 August 2015	Won	
5	127	South Africa	5	1	2/3	Arun Jaitley Stadium, New Delhi	Home	3 December 2015	Won	
6	100*	South Africa	6	3	2/3	Arun Jaitley Stadium, New Delhi	Home	3 December 2015	Won	
7	108*	West Indies	5	2	2/4	Sabina Park, Kingston	Away	30 July 2016	Drawn	
8	188	New Zealand	5	1	3/3	Holkar Stadium, Indore	Home	8 October 2016	Won	
9	132	Sri Lanka	5	1	2/3	Sinhalese SCG, Colombo	Away	3 August 2017	Won	
10	102	West Indies	5	3	1/2	Sir Vivian Richards Stadium, Antigua	Away	22 September 2019	Won	
11	115	South Africa	5	1	3/3	JCSA Stadium, Ranchi	Home	19 October 2019	Won	
12	112	Australia	4	2	2/4	Melbourne Cricket Ground, Melbourne	Away	26 December 2020	Won	

List of ODI centuries
No.	Score	Against	Pos.	Inn.	SR	Venue	H/A/N	Date	Result	Ref
1	106	England	1	2	106.00	Edgbaston, Birmingham	Away	2 September 2014	Won	
2	111	Sri Lanka	1	1	102.78	Barabati Stadium, Cuttack	Home	2 November 2014	Won	
3	103	West Indies	1	1	99.04	Queen's Park Oval, Port of Spain	Away	25 June 2017	Won	

== IPL career ==
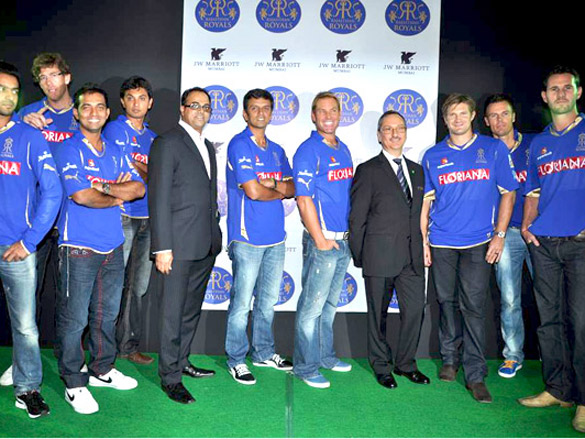
Rahane with his Rajasthan Royals teammates in 2012

Rahane was bought by Rajasthan Royals for the 2012 Indian Premier League. Previously, he was in the Mumbai Indians squad but got limited opportunities. And then, he caught the eye of Rajasthan Royals' Shane Watson, who had watched him score an 80-ball hundred in a session in the second innings of a three-day game against Australia A in 2010. Having bought him from the Mumbai Indians, Rahul Dravid and Watson got Rahane to open the innings. "Opening the batting with Rahul bhai gave me a chance to express myself and showcase all that I had learned over the years," Rahane explained.

Ajinkya Rahane in IPL (2008–15)
Teams	Matches	Runs	HS	Ave	SR	100
MI, RR and RPS	97	3789	105*	37.73	131.34	2

Rahane had a successful stint with Rajasthan Royals, playing under Rahul Dravid's mentorship. He rose to prominence in the 2012 IPL for Rajasthan Royals. He hit a match-winning 98 in his first game of IPL 2012 against Kings XI Punjab and followed that up with an unbeaten 103 against Royal Challengers Bangalore. His 84 off 63 balls against Delhi Daredevils was in vain though, as they lost by one run. In the 2012 IPL, Rahane became the first batsman to hit a century and emerged the leading run-scorer for Rajasthan Royals. He was retained by the Royals for the 2014 Premier League season.

Over the years, Rahul Dravid has been given a lot of credit for way Rahane has matured as a player. With Dravid guiding him, Rahane has transformed from a shy, long-format specialist into a player capable of batting at any position, in any format. Former India captain Sunil Gavaskar told NDTV, "What has been impressive about Rahane's career is the way he has made those little changes that have helped him to get better in every format of the game. This batsman is a thinking batsman, who keeps thinking about how to get better and that is why he is such a vital cog in the Rajasthan Royals team and a vital cog in the Indian cricket team."

Rahane had played for Rising Pune Supergiant in the 2016 and 2017 seasons when Rajasthan Royals were banned from the IPL for two years. Rahane was the leading run-scorer for RPS in the 2016 season. He had led RPS in a match against the Delhi Daredevils in the 2017 season when RPS captain Steve Smith missed out due to food poisoning.

In 2018, Rahane was brought back for Rs 4 crore by Rajasthan Royals by using a Right-to-Match card. Steve Smith was appointed as captain of Rajasthan Royals on 24 February 2018. Following the ball tampering scandal against South Africa, Steve Smith who was the captain of Australia stepped down as the Royals' captain with Rahane set to lead Rajasthan Royals in the 2018 season. Smith was then subsequently banned from playing cricket for a year.

In 2012, Rahane came in limelight when he scored a magnificent century in IPL. The following years helped him join the international matches. His performance in the 2018 season worsened and his strike rate came into talk. He is no longer included in India's ODI and T20I squads for international matches because of this reason. IPL 2019 was important for Rahane as he played some useful innings for Rajasthan; he also smashed a century against Delhi Capitals in the 2019 season and became the highest run scorer for Rajasthan Royals in that season. In November 2019, Rahane was transferred from Rajasthan Royals to Delhi Capitals ahead of the 2020 Indian Premier League. The franchise retained him for the IPL 2021 season. However, Rahane was barely included in any match for the 2021 season after some bad innings in the 2020 season. In February 2022, he was bought by the Kolkata Knight Riders in the auction for the 2022 Indian Premier League tournament.

He is bought by Chennai Super Kings to play in the IPL 2023 season for INR. 50 Lakh in the IPL auction held on 23 December 2022. In the 2023 edition of IPL, Rahane proved to be an integral part of the title winning CSK team where he came to bat at no.3, scoring at an extraordinary strike rate of 175+ in all the games. His crucial knocks proved to be match winning for CSK in the finals. This was Rahane's first IPL title. In IPL 2025 Auction, he was sold to Kolkata Knight Riders for INR 1.50 Crores. In March 2025, he was named the captain of the team. Ahead of the 2026 season, he was retained by Kolkata Knight Riders.

== Media image ==
He was ranked sixth in The Times of India's Top 20 Most Desirable Men of Maharashtra in 2018. He was ranked seventeenth in The Times of India's Top 20 Most Desirable Men of Maharashtra in 2020.

== Awards ==
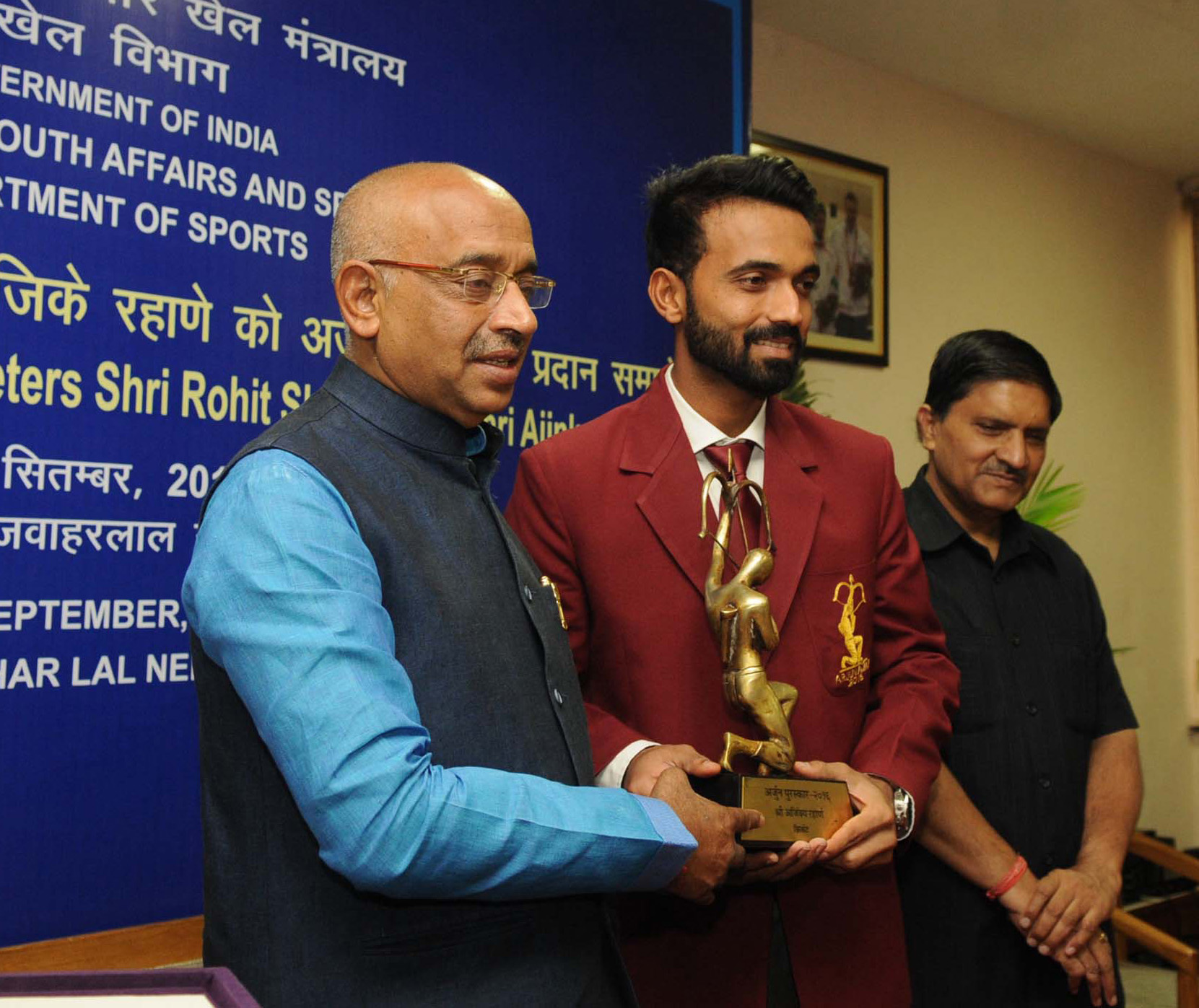
Vijay Goel (left) conferring the Arjuna Award on Rahane (center), 2016

- CEAT Indian Cricketer of the Year: 2014–15
- MA Chidambaram Trophy for best Under-19 cricketer: 2006–07
- Arjuna Award: 2016
