= Annasaheb Shinde =

Indian politician

Annasaheb Shinde Patil
- अण्णासाहेब शिंदे
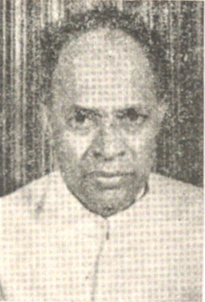

Union Minister of Agriculture

Personal details
- Born: Annasaheb Pandurang Shinde; 21 January 1922 Padali, Nashik, Maharashtra, India
- Died: 12 January 1993 (aged 70) Shrirampur, Maharashtra, India
- Citizenship: India
- Party: Indian National Congress
- Spouse: Hirabai Shinde
- Children: Ashok Shinde, Anil Shinde, Dilip Shinde, Vijaya Dhande
- Parent(s): Pandurang Patil Shinde (father), Anandibai Shinde (mother)
- Education: LLB
- Alma mater: ILS Law College, Pune Pune University
- Occupation: Lawyer; Politician

Annasaheb Shinde Patil (21 January 1922 – 12 January 1993) was member of 3rd and 4th Lok Sabha from Kopargaon (Lok Sabha constituency) in Maharashtra state, India.

He was elected to 5th, and 6th Lok Sabha from Ahmednagar (Lok Sabha constituency). Union Deputy Minister for Food, Agriculture, Community Development and Co-operation, 1966–67; Minister of State in the Ministry of Food, Agriculture, Community Development and Co-operation, 1967–74; Minister of State in the Ministry of Food, Agriculture, and Irrigation, 1974–77.
