= Bhaskar Tukaram Auti =

Indian politician (born 1914)

Bhaskarrao Tukaram Auti (born 1914) was a freedom fighter who played a major role in Indian Independence movement and was elected as a MLA for four consecutive terms from Parner District Ahmednagar Constituency. He won a seat representing Parner in the 1952 and 1957 Bombay Legislative Assembly elections. In the 1952 election, he stood as a Communist Party of India candidate. He was the first Communist MLA of India in the first general elections conducted post-independence. He obtained 12,570 votes (56.67%). In the 1957 election, he stood as an independent, obtaining 14,519 votes (71.05%). In the 1962 Maharashtra Legislative Assembly election he finished in second place in Parner, obtaining 6,787 votes (24.93%).

== Early life and education ==
Bhaskarrao Auti belonged to a Maratha family and was born in Parner in 1914, in the Ahmednagar district of Maharashtra, India. He completed his law degree, after which he entered the civil service of the British Raj, but subsequently resigned to join the Indian independence movement.

== Career ==
Auti was a mentee (manasputra) of fellow independence activist Senapati Bapat. He and Senapati Bapat were both from Parner, which played an important role in the Indian independence movement, and today, there are monuments to both men at Parner. Auti was actively involved in making bombs along with Senapati Bapat at Ganesh Khind in Parner to fight the British. During this time, he and Senapati Bapat were also associated with Vinayak Damodar Savarkar. Anna Hazare, who hails from Ralegan Siddhi, Parner, was also inspired by him.

He was sentenced to prison for a term of two years at Nasik Jail and one year at Visava Jail during the Quit India Movement. He established many primary and secondary schools to offer free education in Ahmednagar district, belonging to Rayat Shikshan Sanstha of Karmveer Bhaurao Patil. He established colleges at Ahmednagar and Parner and employed many people across these educational institutions.

In 1976, Auti led the Communist delegation to Moscow. He created awareness during Indo-China war in 1961. He was a close associate of Shripad Dange, S M Joshi and was a stalwart of Indian Trade Movement. He established the Local Board. During the British Raj, he was most of the time underground fighting with the British. Pandit Jawaharlal Nehru was very much fond of him. Ravi Gaikwad, Commissioner, Government of Maharashtra, who is fighting for the cause of Road Safety to save lives on Indian roads, is his grandson, whose mother Pushpa Gaikwad happens to be his youngest daughter. He died in the year 1978.

== Personal life ==
Auti's wife, Tarabai Auti, was also a freedom fighter. She was more actively involved in the Goa liberation movement, which sought to end Portuguese colonial rule in Goa, India. The Indian government later honored her.

His younger son Vijay Bhaskarrao Auti was unanimously elected as deputy speaker of the Maharashtra Legislative Assembly in 2018.
