= Shankarrao Kale =

Indian politician

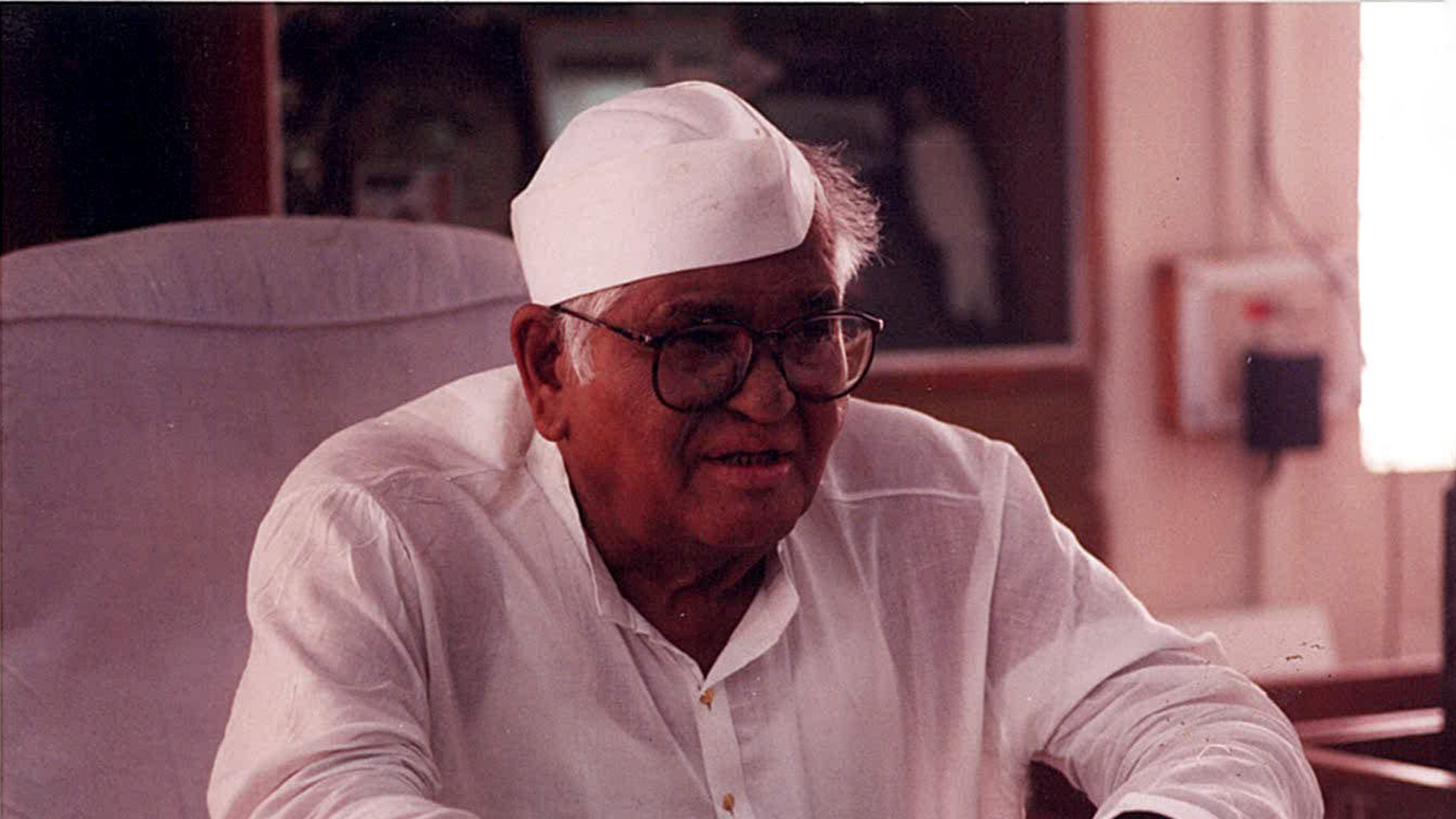
- Kale in sugar factory office

Member of Maharashtra Legislative Assembly
- In office (1972-1978), (1978 – 1980)
- Preceded by: N.T. Gunjal
- Succeeded by: Babasaheb alias Prabhakar Appasaheb Thube
- Constituency: Parner

Member of Parliament, Lok Sabha
- In office (1991–1996)
- Preceded by: Balasaheb Vikhe Patil
- Succeeded by: Bhimrao Badade
- Constituency: Kopargaon Lok Sabha constituency

Personal details
- Born: 6 April 1921 Mahegaon Deshmukh, Maharashtra, India
- Died: 5 November 2012 (aged 91)
- Spouse: Sushilamai Kale
- Occupation: Farmer, politician, social activist

Shankarrao Devram Kale (1921–2012) was an Indian politician and an important figure in the Sahakar chalval co-operative movement in Maharashtra's Ahmednagar district. He was a State Minister in the Cabinet of the then Chief Minister of Maharashtra, Sharad Pawar. He also represented the Kopargaon Loksabha constituency from 1991 to 1996 for the Indian National Congress.

He worked for the welfare of farmers and workers. Ganpatrao Autade established Kopargaon Sahakari Sakhar Karkhana Ltd in 1953 at Kolpewadi, Ahmednagar district, Maharashtra. Shri Kale was one of the founding board of directors. He took the cooperative movement to the top in Ahmednagar district and Maharashtra state as well.

== Death ==
He died on 5 November 2012.

== See also ==
- Ashutosh Ashokrao Kale
