= Ravi Gaikwad =

Indian engineer and civil servant

- Born: Pune, Maharashtra, India
- Education: B.Tech (Electronics and telecommunications); PhD (Electronics and telecommunications engineering); PhD (Sports); (Masters of Engineering); M.Tech (Electronics Engineering); (Masters); MA (Political Science); MA (Sociology); LLB (Bachelor of Legislative law)
- Occupations: Commissioner, RTO, Government of Maharashtra
- Organizations: Chief of RTO; Chairman of Handball Federation of India; Chairman of Shant Bharat Surakshit Bharat; President of Handball Association of Maharashtra
- Known for: Road Safety World Series
- Spouse: Dr Nirmala Gaikwad
- Children: 2
- Website: www.ravigaikwad.com

Ravi Gaikwad is an Indian civil servant and Commissioner, RTO, in the Government of Maharashtra cadre. He is senior member of Road Safety Cell of Government of Maharashtra formed by Supreme Court of India and chief of RTO, Thane and the Konkan region. He serves as the chairman of the Handball Federation of India, a member of International Handball Federation. He is also on the board of Indian Olympic Association and All India Football Federation and the Chairman of Shant Bharat Surakshit Bharat. He has been reelected as President of Handball Association of Maharashtra for second consecutive term in June 2022.

In 2024, he has been posted as Chief of RTO, Mumbai. In 2026, Ravi Gaikwad has been appointed as Chairman of Marathi Commission for Government of Maharashtra.

In 2026, Ravi Gaikwad has been appointed by Government of Maharashtra on Special Investigation Team (SIT) to probe into the scam regarding the nexus between transporters and officials of overloading vehicles.

== Early life and education ==
Ravi Gaikwad was born in Pune to Pushpa and Kisanrao Gaikwad in a Royal Maratha family. He completed his early education at Little Flower Convent High School and received his Engineering Degree in Electronics and Telecommunications.

Gaikwad was a state topper in the merit list of Higher Secondary Certificate Examinations (HSC) in Maharashtra State. He has represented in Under 15, Under 17, and Under 19 categories of Maharashtra and was selected in the Ranji Trophy Camp of Maharashtra. After engineering he joined TATA as a scientist. Gaikwad cleared Civil Services and joined the Government of Maharashtra. He received two Gold Medals one for being first in Electronics and Telecommunications Engineering and also being first in all the branches of Engineering across all Universities in the state of Maharashtra. He has a remarkable feat of having scored 100/100 in two subjects of his final year of Engineering. Ravi has completed his PhD (Doctorate in Philosophy) in (Electronics and Telecommunications Engineering) and PhD (Doctorate in Philosophy) in Sports. Masters in Engineering |( M.E) Electronics Masters |(MA) Political Science |LLB (Bachelor of Legislative law).

== Road Safety World Series ==
Ravi Gaikwad is the founder of Road Safety World Series that promotes Road Safety to save Indian lives on Indian Roads. Government of India plays an important role in Road Safety World Series. Hon Minister Nitin Gadkari has been supporting this series for such a noble cause of road safety.

It is a legends Cricket World Cup, an annual event. Every year almost three lakh people die on Indian Roads in road accidents and a million people are handicapped every year. Sachin Tendulkar is the Brand Ambassador of the series and Sunil Gavaskar is the commissioner of the series. Season 1 commenced at Wankhede stadium in March 2020 and was split in two phases due to covid concluding in March 2021 at Raipur.

Ravi Gaikwad has also played in the India Legends team as a player under the captaincy of Sachin Tendulkar in Road safety world series to promote Road safety. Ravi Gaikwad, the founder of the series got together with Yohan Blake, Olympic Gold Medalist to promote the noble cause of road safety in this series.

== Public safety ==
Gaikwad worked as Chief of Mumbai (West Zone)..He later worked as Chief of Mumbai Suburban region of RTO at Borivali. Later he was transferred as Chief of Thane, Konkan region in the state of Maharashtra. In 2024, he has been posted as Chief of RTO, Mumbai

In 2018, Gaikwad organized the 'Horn Not Ok' campaign to increase road safety awareness. The drive was attended by Indian cricketers Hardik Pandya and Shikhar Dhawan.

During the coronavirus lockdown, in May 2020, Gaikwad saw action against illegal transport of migrants with them issuing 250 memos to such vehicles.

== Shant Bharat Surakshit Bharat ==
Ravi Gaikwad is the chairman of "Shant Bharat Surakshit Bharat" a philanthropic trust. To fulfill Ravi Gaikwad's Shant Bharat Surakshit Bharat, Road Safety 2024 Initiative is organized by DM Foundation in association with Brahma Kumaris.

== Literature ==
Ravi Gaikwad served on the editorial board of the journal "The Parliamentarian." He has written a draft of the Indian Constitution. He is charitable, perceptive and intelligent in his writings and speeches, spiritual and kind.

== US Hall of Fame ==
Ravi Gaikwad has been inducted in US Hall of Fame. The others inducted in Hall of Fame since its inception are several former cricket stars including Sir Donald George Bradman, Sir Everton Weekes, Sir Frank Worrell, Sir Garfield Sobers, Sir Leonard Hutton, Sir Vivian Richards, Abid Sayed Ali, Alvin Kallicharran, Sunil Gavaskar, Gundappa Viswanath.

== Awards and honors ==
- SAKAL AWARD for good governance and as a cricketer in the field of sports
- Man of excellence Award 2020 from IndianAchiever's forum
- Best Engineer's Award by Engineer's Association of India (EAI)
- Nelson Mandela Humanitarian Award for social welfare
- The Times Group's third edition of "Global Indians 2022" has 25 additional well-known individuals in addition to Ravi Gaikwad's biography.
- Guinness World Record for the largest handball class conducted to encourage the playing of handball in India.
- Road Safety Award from Government of Maharashtra for spreading awareness and in turn reducing the number of deaths and road accidents in the state.
- Guinness book of world record for Road Safety in 2016
- CSR Times Award 2020 for promoting road safety, sports, and social welfare.
- In May 2021, Gaikwad has been honoured with INDIA CORONA AWARD by Wockhardt Foundation. In the same year he has also been honoured with COVID FIGHTERS AWARD by Government of Maharashtra.
- Mother Teresa International Award 2022 for Social Justice by Governor of Maharashtra.
- Maharashtra Gaurav Puraskar for promotion of Road Safety.
- Zee Lifetime Achievement Award in Engineering, Science and Technology
- Times Lifetime Achievement Award, Times Brand Icon by Times Group in Sports
- CNBC Lifetime Achievement Award in Sports

== Personal life ==
Gaikwad is married with Dr Nirmala who is a practicing physician and they have two children.

== See also ==
- Uttarakhand State Football Association
