= Kopargaon =

- Town
- Location in Maharashtra, India
- Coordinates: 19.885°N 74.478°E
- Country: India
- State: Maharashtra
- District: Ahmadnagar
- Elevation: 493 m (1,617 ft)

Population (2011)
  - Total: 65,273

Languages
  - Official: Marathi
- Time zone: UTC+5:30 (IST)
- Postal code: 423601
- Vehicle registration: MH17

Kopargaon is a town and municipality located in the Ahmednagar district of the Indian state of Maharashtra.

== Geography ==
Kopargaon is situated at 19.88°N 74.48°E. It has an average elevation of 593 meters (2,117 feet) and lies on the banks of the Godavari River.

== Demographics ==
In the India census of 2011, The town of Kopargaon had a population of 65,273, of which 51% was male and 49% female. Thirteen percent of the population is under 6 years of age. Kopargaon has a literacy rate of 69%. Male literacy is 76%, female literacy is 62%. This compares favorably with the national literacy ratio of 59.5%.
