= List of villages in Sangamner taluka =

There are around 171 villages in Sangamner tehsil of Ahmednagar district of state of Maharashtra. Following is the list of village in Sangamner tehsil.

== A ==
- Akalapur
- Ambhore
- Ambidumala
- Ambikhalsa
- Amlewadi
- Ashvi Bk
- Ashvi Kd
- Aurangpur

== B ==
- Bhojdari
- Birewadi
- Borban
- Bota

== C ==
- Chandanapuri
- Chanegoan
- Chikani
- Chikhali
- Chincholi Gurav
- Chinchpur Kd

== D ==
- Darewadi
- Dawas
- Devgoan
- Devkavthe
- Dhad Khurd
- Dhandarphal Bk
- Dhandarphal Kd
- Digras
- Dolasane
- Devpur

== G ==
- Ghargon
- Ghulewadi
- Gunjalwadi
- Ganeshwadi

== J ==
- Jakhori
- Jambhul Wadi
- Jambut Bk
- Jawale Baleshwar
- Jawale Kadlag
- Jorvee

== K ==
- Kanjapur
- Kankapur
- Kanoli
- Karjulepathar
- Karule
- Kasaradumala
- Kasare
- Khali
- Khambe
- Khandarmalwadi
- Khandgoan
- Kharadi
- Khare
- Kharshinde
- Kokangoan
- Kolhewadi
- Kolwade
- Konchi
- Khed
- Kothe Bk
- Kauthe Dhandarphal
- Kauthe Kamleshwar
- Kothe Kd
- Kouthe Malkapur
- Kuran
- Kurkundi
- Kurkutwadi
- Karule
- Kakadwadi

== L ==
- Lohare

== M ==
- Manchi
- Mahalwadi
- Maldad
- Malegoan Haveli
- Malegoan Pathar
- Malewadi
- Malunje
- Mandve Bk
- Manglapur
- Manoli
- Mendhawan
- Mhaswandi
- Mirpur
- Mirzapur

== N ==
- Nanduri Dumala
- Nandurkhandrmal
- Nilwande
- Nimaj
- Nimbale
- Nimgoan Bhojapur
- Nimgoan Bk
- Nimgoan Kd
- Nimgaon Tembhi
- Nimgoanjali
- Nimon
- Nannaj Dumala

== O ==
- Ozer BK
- Ozer Kd

== P ==
- Palaskhede
- Panodi
- Paregaon Bk
- Paregoan Kd
- Pemgiri
- Pimpalgaon konzira
- Pimpalgaon Matha
- Pimpalgoan Depa
- Pimpalgaon Khand
- Pimparne
- Pimple
- Pimpri louki Azampur
- Pokhari Baleshwar
- Pokhari Haveli
- Pratappur

== R ==
- Rahimpur(Mal)
- Rahimpur(Khale Gaon)
- Rajapur
- Rankhambwadi
- Rayate
- Rayatewadi

== S ==
- Sadatpur
- Sakur
- Samnapur
- Sangamner Kd
- Sangvi
- Sarole Pathar
- Sawarchol
- Sawargoan Ghule
- Sawargoan Tal
- Saykhindi
- Shedgoan
- Shiblapur
- Shindodi
- Shirapur
- Shirasgoan Dhupe
- Shindewadi
- Sukewadi

== T ==
- Talegoan
- Tisgoan
- Tigoan

== U ==
- Umbri Balapur

== V ==
- Velhale
- Vadzari

== W ==
- Wadgoan Landga
- Wadgoanpan
- Wadzari Bk
- Wadzari Kd
- Waghapur
- Wankute
- Warudi Pathar
- Warvandi
- Wadzari Bk
- Wadgavpan

== Z ==
- Zarekati
- Zole

== See also ==
- Sangamner tehsil
- Tehsils in Ahmednagar
- Villages in Akole tehsil
- Villages in Jamkhed tehsil
- Villages in Karjat tehsil
- Villages in Kopargaon tehsil
- Villages in Nagar tehsil
- Villages in Nevasa tehsil
- Villages in Parner tehsil
- Villages in Pathardi tehsil
- Villages in Rahata tehsil
- Villages in Rahuri tehsil
- Villages in Shevgaon tehsil
- Villages in Shrigonda tehsil
- Villages in Shrirampur tehsil
