= List of villages in Nagar taluka =

There are around 117 villages in Nagar tehsil of Ahmednagar district of state of Maharashtra. Following is Balewaditehsil.

== A ==
- Agadgaon
- Ahvadwadi
- Akolner
- Ambilwadi
- Arangaon
- Athawad
- Akole

== B ==
- Balewadi
- Barababhali
- Baradari
- Belapur
- Bhatodi (pargaon)
- Bhorwadi
- Bhoyare Kh
- Bhoyare Pathar
- Burhanagar
- nagar
- Burudgaon

== C ==
- Chas
- Chichondi Patil

== D ==
- Dahigaon
- Darewadi
- Dashamigavan
- Dehare
- Deogaon
- Deulgaon Siddhi
- Dhangarwadi
- Dongargan

== G ==
- Ghospuri
- Gunawadi
- Gundegaon

== H ==
- Hamidpur
- Hatwalan
- Hingangaon
- Hiwarebazar
- Hiwarezare

== I ==
- Imampur
- Islak

== J ==
- Jakhangaon
- Jeur

== K ==
- Kamargaon
- Kaparewadi
- Karjune Khare
- Khadaki
- Khandake
- Khandala
- Khatgaon Takali
- Khospuri
- Kolhewadi
- Koudgaon
- Kedgaon (Deviche)

== M ==
- Madadgaon
- Majalechincholi
- Mandave
- Manjarsumba
- Mathani
- Mathapimpri
- Mehekari

== N ==
- Nagardeole
- Nandgaon
- Narayandoho
- Nepti
- Nimblak
- Nimbodi
- Nimgaon Ghana
- Nimgaon Wagha
- Navnagapur

== P ==
- Pangarmal
- Parewadi
- Pargaon (bhatodi)
- Pargaon Moula
- Pimpalgaon Landaga
- Pimpalgaon Kouda
- Pimpalgaon Malvi
- Pimpalgaon Ujjaini
- Pimpalgaon Wagha
- Pokhardi

== R ==
- Ralegan

Ranjani

- Ratadgaon
- Ruichhattisi

== S ==
- Sakat Kh
- Sandave
- Sarola Baddi
- Sarola Kasar
- Sasewadi
- Shahapur/kekati
- Shendi
- Shingave
- Shiradhon
- Sonewadi
- Sonewadi P
- Savedi

== T ==
- Takali Kazi
- Takali Khatgaon
- Tandali Wadgaon
- Teesgoan

== U ==
- Udarmal
- Ukkadgaon

== V ==
- Vilad

== W ==
- Wadarwadi
- Wadgaon Gupta
- Wadgaon Tandali
- Wakodi
- Walaki
- Walunj
- Warulwadi
- Watephal

== See also ==
- Nagar tehsil
- Tehsils in Ahmednagar
- Villages in Akole tehsil
- Villages in Jamkhed tehsil
- Villages in Karjat tehsil
- Villages in Kopargaon tehsil
- Villages in Nevasa tehsil
- Villages in Parner tehsil
- Villages in Pathardi tehsil
- Villages in Rahata tehsil
- Villages in Rahuri tehsil
- Villages in Sangamner tehsil
- Villages in Shevgaon tehsil
- Villages in Shrigonda tehsil
- Villages in Shrirampur tehsil
