= List of villages in Kopargaon taluka =

There are around 79 villages in Kopargaon tehsil of Ahmednagar district of state of Maharashtra. Following is the list of village in Kopargaon tehsil.

== A ==
- Anchalgaon
- Anjanapur
- Apegaon

== B ==
- Bahadarabad
- Bahaderpur
- Baktarpur
- Bhojade
- Bolaki
- Bramhangaon

== C ==
- Chandekasare
- Chandgavan
- Chasnali
- Chandaneshwar

== D ==
- Dahegaon Bolaka
- Dauch Bk
- Dauch Kd
- Derde Chandvad
- Derde Korhale
- Dhamori
- Dharangaon
- Dhondewadi
- Dhotre

== G ==
- Ghari
- Ghoegaon
- Godhegaon

== H ==
- Handewadddi
- Hingani

== J ==
- Jawalake
- Jeurkumbhari
- Jeurpatoda

== K ==
- Kakadi
- Kanhegaon
- Karanji
- Karwadi
- Kasali
- Khirdiganesh
- Khopadi
- Kokamthan
- Kolagaonthadi
- Kolapewadi
- Kumbhar
- Kopargaon

== L ==
- Louki

== M ==
- Madhi Bk
- Madhi Kd
- Mahegaon Deshmukh
- Malegaonthadi
- Manegaon
- Manjur
- Mayegaondevi
- Morvis
- Murshatpur
- Malegaon

== N ==
- Nategaon

== O ==
- Ogadi

== P ==
- Padhegaon
- Pohegaon Kd

 Tal.Kopargaon
 pin code.423605

== R ==
- Ranjangaon Deshmukh
- Ravande

== S ==
- Shingave
- Shahapur
- Suregaon
- Sanvatsar
- Sonari
- Sangvi Bhusar
- Sonewadi

== T ==
- Takali
- Tilawani
- Talegaon Male

== V ==
- Vadgaon
- Velapur

== W ==
- Wari
- Wes

== Y ==
- Yesgaon

== See also ==
- Kopargaon tehsil
- Tehsils in Ahmednagar
- Villages in Akole tehsil
- Villages in Jamkhed tehsil
- Villages in Karjat tehsil
- Villages in Nagar tehsil
- Villages in Nevasa tehsil
- Villages in Parner tehsil
- Villages in Pathardi tehsil
- Villages in Rahata tehsil
- Villages in Rahuri tehsil
- Villages in Sangamner tehsil
- Villages in Shevgaon tehsil
- Villages in Shrigonda tehsil
- Villages in Shrirampur tehsil
