= List of villages in Shrirampur taluka =

There are around 54 villages in Shrirampur taluka of Ahmednagar district of state of Maharashtra. Following is the list of village in Shrirampur taluka.

== A ==
- Aklahre
- Ashoknagar

== B ==
- Belapur Bk :
- Belapur Kh
- Bhamathan
- Bherdapur -
- Bhokar
- Bramhangon vetal
- Bhairavnath nagar(Gondhawani)
- Babasahebnagar

== D ==
- Dighi

== F ==
- Fattyabad

== G ==
- Galnib
- Gondegoan
- Gowardhan
- Gujarwadi
- Gumandev

== H ==
- Haregon

== J ==
- Jafarabad

== K ==
- Kadit Bk
- Kadit kh.
- Kamalpur
- Kanhegoan
- Karegoan
- Khanapur
- Khandala
- Khirdi
- Khokar
- Kolhar Budrukh
- Kuranpur

== L ==
- Ladgoan

== M ==
- Mahankalwadgao
- Malewadi
- Malunja Bk
- Malwadgoan
- Mandve
- Matapur
- Matulthan
- Muthewadgao

== N ==
- Naur
- Naygoan
- Nimgoan khairi
- Nipani Wadgoan

== P ==
- Padhegaon

== R ==
- Rampur - Kokare
- Ranjankhol

== S ==
- Sarla
- Shermale wasti
- Shirasgoan
- Shrirampur

== T ==
- Taklibhan
- Tilaknagar

== U ==
- Umbargoan
- Ukkalgaon
- Undirgoan

== W ==
- Wadala Mahadev
- Waladgoan
- Wangi Bk
- Wangi Khd
- wanjalgaon

== See also ==
- Shrirampur taluka
- Talukas in Ahmednagar district
- Villages in Akole taluka
- Villages in Jamkhed taluka
- Villages in Karjat taluka
- Villages in Kopargaon taluka
- Villages in Nagar taluka
- Villages in Nevasa taluka
- Villages in Parner taluka
- Villages in Pathardi taluka
- Villages in Rahata taluka
- Villages in Rahuri taluka
- Villages in Sangamner taluka
- Villages in Shevgaon taluka
- Villages in Shrigonda taluka
