= Bhanashivara =

Village in Maharashtra, India

- village
- Location in Maharashtra, India Bhanashivara (India)
- Coordinates: 19°29′9″N 74°57′59″E
- Country: India
- State: Maharashtra
- District: Ahmednagar
- Taluka: Nevasa

Area
  - village: 1.08 km^{2} (0.42 sq mi)
  - Urban: 0.36 km^{2} (0.14 sq mi)
- Highest elevation: 507 m (1,663 ft)
- Lowest elevation: 498 m (1,634 ft)

Population (2011)
  - village: 12,443
  - Density: 11,500/km^{2} (29,800/sq mi)

Languages
  - Official: Marathi
- Time zone: UTC+5:30 (IST)
- PIN: 414609

BhanasHivara is a panchayat village in Nevasa tehsil of the Ahmednagar district in the Indian state of Maharashtra. BhanasHivara is found under the Nevasa Vidhan Sabha constituency and the Shirdi Lok sabha constituency. The pincode of BhanasHivara is 414609. BhanasHivara is located on the Nevasa-Shevgaon district highway no. 44. The village is both side surrounded by the forest area of Nagapur and Mali-Chinchora.

It is found 15 kilometres (9.3 miles) away from Nevasa phata which is the middle point of Ahmednagar and Aurangabad City. Its nearest popular pilgrimages are Nevasa -Sant Dnyaneshwar temple, Devgad, Shani-Shingnapur.

== History ==
The great Nizam’s commandant "Kavijung" established the BhanasHivara (भानसहिवरा) village in the work-period of Nizam Shahi dynasty at around 1350 AD.

=== Toponymy ===
This ancient village has several traditional names. The first one 'Gadicha Hivara' and it refers to the Tomb of Kavijung Baba which is near the village and is about 500 years old, The second one and current 'BhanasHivara' come from the King "BHANAS" that ruled over the area and the village was his capital of that time.

=== Historic Locations ===
One famous residence of the Emperor Kavijung was named as "Gadhi" and is situated in the heart of village. On the behalf of commandant Kavijung there is one 'Janab Kavijng Sahab Dargah Sharif' also present in the village and on the behalf of that there is always a village-fair in every year.

== Demographics ==
The population of this village was about 12,443 in the year 2011. The majority of the population in BhanHivara are Hindu, Muslim and Christian. People of all communities live here.

== Economy ==
Most of the residents in this village are farmers, they cultivate various crops in the farms. There is also a sugarcane factory called Dnyneshwar SSK Bhende which is located 5 kilometres (3.1 mi) away from the village.

== Education ==
There is an old High School run by Zilla Parishad & other named 'Shriram High School' run by Maratha Shikshan Prasarak Mandal, along with residential Gadge Maharaj Ashram Shala. There is also an Urdu medium school. Recently, one polytechnic college have been founded in the village named as Sant Dnyaneshwar Polytechnic.

== Temples ==
The very well-known and ancient ShriRam Mandir and 1008 ParshwaNath Di-jain temple is located in the village.

== See also ==
- Villages in Nevasa taluka
