= List of villages in Rahuri taluka =

There are around 96 villages in Rahuri tehsil of Ahmednagar district of state of Maharashtra.

== B ==
- Babhulgaon
- Barogaon Nandur
- Bodhegaon
- Bramhangaon Bhand
- Bramhani

== C ==
- Chandegaon
- Cheadgaon
- Chichale
- Chikhalthan (Sheri Chikhalthan)
- Chincholi
- Chinchvihire

== D ==
- Daradgaon Thadi
- Dawangaon
- Deswandi
- Dhamori Bk
- Dhamori Kd
- Dhanore
- Digras
- Deolali Pravara

== Gonandpipri ==
- Ganegaon
- Gangapur
- Ghorpadwadi
- Guha
- Gunjale

== J ==
- Jambhali
- Jatap
- Jogeshwari Akhada

== K ==
- Kanadgaon
- Kangar Bk
- Karajgaon
- Katrad
- Kendal Bk
- Kendal Kd
- Kesapur
- Khadambe Bk
- Khadambe Kd
- Khudasargaon
- Kolewadi
- Kolhar Kd
- Kondhawad
- Kopare
- Kukkadwedhe
- Kuranwadi

== L ==
- Lakh

== M ==
- Mahegaon
- Malharwadi
- Malunje khurd
- Manjari
- Manori
- Mhaisagaon
- Mokal Ohol
- Momin Akhada
- Musalwadi

== N ==
- Nimbhere

== P ==
- Pathare Kd
- Pimpalgaon Funagi
- Pimpari Walan
- Pimpri Awaghad

== R ==
- Rahuri Kd
- Rampur
- Rahuri factory

== S ==
- Sade in mahadevadi
- Sankrapur
- Satral
- Shilegaon
- Songaon

== T ==
- Taharabad
- Tamnar Akhada
- Tambhere
- Tandulner
- Tandulwadi
- Tilapur
- Tulapur
- Takalimiya
- Tilapur kakad wadi

== U ==
- Umbare

== V ==
- Vambori

== W ==
- Wadner
- Walan
- Wanjulpoie
- Warath
- Warshinde
- Warvandi

== See also ==
- Rahuri tehsil
- Tehsils in Ahmednagar
- Villages in Akole tehsil
- Villages in Jamkhed tehsil
- Villages in Karjat tehsil
- Villages in Kopargaon tehsil
- Villages in Nagar tehsil
- Villages in Nevasa tehsil
- Villages in Parner tehsil
- Villages in Pathardi tehsil
- Villages in Rahata tehsil
- Villages in Sangamner tehsil
- Villages in Shevgaon tehsil
- Villages in Shrigonda tehsil
- Villages in Shrirampur tehsil
