= List of villages in Shevgaon taluka =

There are around 112 villages in Shevgaon tehsil of Ahmednagar district of state of Maharashtra. Following is the list of village in Shevgaon tehsil.

== A ==
- Adhodi
- Akhatwade
- Akhegaon Titarfa
- Amrapur
- Antarwali Bk
- Antarwali Khurd she
- Avhane Bk
- Avhane Kd
- Aapegaon

== B ==
- BhaviNimgaon
- Bodhegaon
- Balamtakali
- Belgaon
- Baktarpur
- Bodkhe
- Badgahavan
- Bhatkudgaon
- Bhagur

== C ==
- Chapadgaon
- Chedechandga

== D ==
- Dadegaon
- Dahifal New
- Dahifal Old
- Dahigaon Ne
- Dahigaon She
- Deotakli
- Dhorjagaon She
- Dhorjalgaon Ne
- Dhorsade
- Divate
- Dhumagad Tanda
- Dhorhingani

== E ==
- Erandgaon

== G ==
- गदेवाडी
- Gaikwadjalgaon
- Ghotan
- Golegaon
- Garadwadi

== H ==
- Hasanapur
- Hatgaon
- Hingangaon Ne

== J ==
- Joharpur

== K ==
- Karhetakali
- Khadaka
- Khamgaon
- Khampimpri New
- Khampimpri

Old

- Khanapur
- Kharadgaon
- Khuntephal
- Kol gaon
- Konoshi
- Kurudgaon

== L ==
- Ladjalgaon
- Lakhamapuri
- Lolegaon
- Lakhephal

== M ==
- Maalegaon Ne
- Madake
- Majaleshahar
- Malegaon She
- Mangrul Bk
- Mangrul Kd
- Mungi
- Malkapur

== N ==
- Nagalwadi Tanda
- Nagalwadi
- Najik Babhulgaon
- Nimbe
- Nandurvihire

== P ==
- Pingewadi
- Prabhuwadgaon

== R ==
- Ranegaon
- Ranjani
- Rakshi

== S ==
- Salwadgaon
- Samangaon
- Shahartkali
- Shekte Bk
- Shekte Kd
- Shevgaon
- Shingori
- Sonesangavi
- Sonvihir
- Sukali
- Sultanpur Bk
- Sultanpur Kd
- Shobhanagar
- Sevanagar
- Sule pimpalgaon
- Sahapur
- Sahajanpur

== T ==
- Tajnapur
- Talni
- Thakurnimgaon
- Thakurpimpalgaon
- Thate

== V ==
- Vijaipur

== W ==
- Wadgaon
- Wadule Bk
- Wadule Kd
- Wagholi
- Warkhed
- Warur Bk
- Warur Kd

== See also ==
- Shevgaon tehsil
- Tehsils in Ahmednagar
- Villages in Akole tehsil
- Villages in Jamkhed tehsil
- Villages in Karjat tehsil
- Villages in Kopargaon tehsil
- Villages in Nagar tehsil
- Villages in Nevasa tehsil
- Villages in Parner tehsil
- Villages in Pathardi tehsil
- Villages in Rahata tehsil
- Villages in Rahuri tehsil
- Villages in Sangamner tehsil
- Villages in Shrigonda tehsil
- Villages in Shrirampur tehsil
