= Aslam Inamdar =

Indian kabaddi player (born 2000)

Personal information
- Full name: Aslam Mustafa Inamdar
- Born: 23 February 2000 (age 26) Taklibhan, Maharashtra, India

Sport
- Sport: Kabaddi
- League: Pro Kabaddi League
- Team: Puneri Paltan (2021–present)
Medal record
Men's kabaddi
Representing India
Asian Games
Gold medal – first place	2026 Aichi–Nagoya	Team
Gold medal – first place	2022 Hangzhou	Team

Aslam Mustafa Inamdar (born 23 February 2000) is an Indian kabaddi player. He began his career playing in the sub-junior nationals in Maharashtra, then joined Puneri Paltan as a raider from the 2021 Pro Kabaddi League season. He was a part of the Indian men's kabaddi squad that won gold at the 2022 Asian Games.

== Early life ==
Inamdar hails from Taklibhan village in the Ahilyanagar district of Maharashtra. He comes from a lower-middle-class family. His father died in 2011, his mother was a domestic help and he worked as a cleaner in a small restaurant. Inamdar's success in kabaddi has helped improve his family's financial situation tremendously.
