= Bhamathan =

Village in Maharashtra

Bhamathan, is a village and gram panchayat in Shrirampur taluka of Ahmednagar district in Maharashtra State, India.

The pincode is 413739. The location code or village code of Bhamathan is 557662.

The total geographical area of village is 1523 hectares. In 2011 Bhamathan had a total population of 2,277 people (1190 males, 1087 females) comprising 440 households.

It is situated at river of Godavari.
