= List of villages in Karjat taluka =

There are around 118 villages in Karjat taluka in the Ahmednagar district of state of Maharashtra. Following are the list of villages in Karjat taluka.

== A ==
- Akhani
- Akhoni
- Alsunde (Marimata)
- Ambijalgav

== B ==
- Babhulgaon Khalsa
- Bahirobawadi
- Bajrangwadi
- Baradgaon Dagadi
- Baradgaon Sudrik
- Belgaon kanadi
- Belwandi
- Benwadi
- Berdi
- Bhambora
- Bhose
- Bitakewadi

== C ==
- Chande Bk
- Chande Kd
- Chakhalewadi
- Chapadgaon
- Chilawadi
- Chincholi Kaldat
- Chincholi Ramjan

== D ==
- Demanwadi
- Deshmukhwadi
- Dhalwadi
- Dighi
- Diksal
- Dombalwadi
- Dudhodi
- Durgaon

== G ==
- Ganeshwadi
- Ghumari
- Goykarwadi
- Gundachiwadi
- Gurau Pimpri

== H ==
- Hanumanbet

== K ==
- Kalyachiwadi
- Kangudwadi
- Karjat
- Karpadi
- Kaudane
- Khandala
- Khandavi
- Khatagaon
- Khed
- Khidhanwadi
- Khurangewadi
- Kokangaon
- Kombhali
- Kopardi
- Koregaon
- Kuldharan
- Kumbhefal

== L ==
- Loni Masadepur

== M ==
- Mahalungi
- Mahi Jalgoan
- Malthan
- Mandali omkar Leman
- Manewadi
- Mirajagaon
- Mulewadi

== N ==
- Nagalwadi
- Nagamthan
- Nagapur
- Nandgaon
- Nawasarwadi
- Nimbhe
- Nimbodi
- Nimgaon Daku
- Nimgaon Ganagarda

== P ==
Pimpalwadi

Patewadi

Pategaon

== R ==
- Rakshaswadi Bk
- Rakshswadi Kd
- Rashin
- Ratanjan
- Rawalgaon
- Rehekuri
- Ruigavan

== S ==
- Shegud
- Shimpora
- Shinde (Shinda)
- Siddhatek
- Sonalwadi

== T ==
- Taju
- Takali Khandeshweri
- Talwadi
- Tambe Vadi
- Taradgaon
- Thergaon
- Therwadi Gadade Nagar
- Thikhi
- Torkadwadi

thane

== W ==
- Wadgaun Tanpure
- Waghnali
- Walwad

== See also ==
- Karjat tehsil
- Tehsils in Ahmednagar
- Villages in Akole tehsil
- Villages in Jamkhed tehsil
- Villages in Kopargaon tehsil
- Villages in Nagar tehsil
- Villages in Nevasa tehsil
- Villages in Parner tehsil
- Villages in Pathardi tehsil
- Villages in Rahata tehsil
- Villages in Rahuri tehsil
- Villages in Sangamner tehsil
- Villages in Shevgaon tehsil
- Villages in Shrigonda tehsil
- Villages in Shrirampur tehsil
