= List of villages in Akole taluka =

There are around 191 villages in Akole tehsil of Ahmednagar district of state of Maharashtra. Following is the list of village in Akole tehsil.

== A ==
- Akole
- Ambad
- Abit Khind
- Ambevangan
- Ambit
- Aurangpur
- Ambhol

== B ==
- Babhulwandi
- Badgi
- Bahir Wadi
- Bari
- Belapur
- Bhandardara
- Bholewadi
- Bori
- Bramhanwada
- Bhangewadi
- Balthan
- Bitaka

== C ==
- Chandgir Wadi
- Chandsuraj
- Chas
- Chichondi
- Chinchawane
- Chittalwedhe
- Chaitanyapur

== D ==
- Deogaon
- Dhumalwadi
- Devthan
- Dhamangaon Awari
- Dhamangaon Pat
- Dhamanwan
- Dhokari
- Digambar
- Dongargaon
- Dhagewadi

== E ==
- Ekdare

== G ==
- Ganore
- Gambhirwadi
- Gardani
- Ghatghar
- Ghodsar Wadi
- Ghotkarwadi
- Ghoti
- Ghondhushi
- Guhire
- Garwadi

== H ==
- Hivargaon Ambre

== I ==
- Indori

== J ==
- Jachakwadi
- Jachakwadi (Dattawadi)
- Jahagirdar Wadi
- Jambhale
- Jamgaon
- Jayana Wadi
- Jadhavwadi

== K ==
- Kalamb
- Kalas Bk
- Kalas Kh
- Karandi
- Katalapur
- Kauthewadi
- Keli Kotul
- Keli Otur
- Kelirumham Wadi
- Kelungan
- Khadaki Kd
- khadaki Bk
- Khaanaapur
- Khirvire
- Khuntewadi
- Kohane
- Kohondi
- Kokan Wadi
- Kulthembe
- Kumbhalne
- Kondani
- Kothale
- Kotul
- Kumbhephal
- Kumshet
- Kalewadi
- Karwadi
- Kokanvadi

== L ==
- Ladgaon
- Lahit Bk
- Lahit Kh
- Lavhali Otur
- Lingdev
- Lavhali kotul

== M ==
- Malegaon
- Manhere
- Manoharpur
- Manyale
- Maveshi
- Mehenduri
- Mhaladevi
- Mhalungi
- Mogras
- Murshet
- Muthalane
- Mutkhel

== N ==
- Nachanthav
- Nawalewadi
- Nilvande
- Nimbral
- Nirgudwadi

== P ==
- Pawarwadi
- Pachapatta Wadi
- Pachnai
- Padalane
- Padoshi
- Paithan
- Palsunde
- Pangari
- Panjare
- Parkhatpur
- Pedhe Wadi
- Pendshet
- Pimpaldara Wadi
- Pimpaldari
- Pimpalgaon Khand
- Pimpalgaon Nakwinda
- Pimpalgaon Nipani
- Pimparkane
- Purushwardi
- Phopsandi

== R ==
- Rajur
- Ratanwadi
- Rede
- Rumbhodi
- Randha Bk

== S ==
- Sakirwadi
- Saamrad
- Samsherpur
- Saanghavi
- Saatewadi
- Saawargaon Paat
- Saawarkute
- Shelad
- Shelvihire
- Shendi
- Shenit
- Sherankhel
- Shilwandi
- Shinganwadi
- Shirpunje Bk
- Shiswad
- Somalwadi
- Sugaon Bk
- Sugaon Kh

== T ==
- Taahaakari
- Taakli
- Tale
- Taambhol
- Terungan
- Tirde
- Tirdhe
- Titvi

== U ==
- Udadawane
- Unchkhadak Bk
- Unchkhadak Kh

== V ==
- Virgaon
- Vithe
- Vihir

== W ==
- Waaghaapur
- Waaki
- Wanjulshet
- Waaranghushi
- Waashere
- Waaghdari

== See also ==
- Akole tehsil
- Tehsils in Ahmednagar
- Villages in Jamkhed tehsil
- Villages in Karjat tehsil
- Villages in Kopargaon tehsil
- Villages in Nagar tehsil
- Villages in Nevasa tehsil
- Villages in Parner tehsil
- Villages in Pathardi tehsil
- Villages in Rahata tehsil
- Villages in Rahuri tehsil
- Villages in Sangamner tehsil
- Villages in Shevgaon tehsil
- Villages in Shrigonda tehsil
- Villages in Shrirampur tehsil
