= List of villages in Jamkhed taluka =

There are around 88 villages in Jamkhed tehsil of Ahmednagar district of state of Maharashtra. Following is the list of village in Jamkhed tehsil.

== A ==
- Agi
- Anadwadi
- Apti
- Arangaon
- Amlaner

== B ==
- Balgahvan
- Bandhkhadak
- Bavi
- Borle
- Bhutawda
- Barhanpur
- Bhogalwadi

== C ==
- Chobhewadi
- Chondi

== D ==
- Deodaithan
- Dhamangaon
- Dhanegaon
- Dhanora
- Dhondpargaon
- Dighol
- Dongaon (Warewasti)
- Disalewadi

== F ==
- Fakrabad

== G ==
- Ghodegaon
- Gurewadi
- Girawali

== H ==
- Halgaon

== J ==
- Jamkhed
- Jamadarwadi
- jamwadi
- Jategaon vishnu ankush

- Jawala
- Jawalke
- Jaybhaywadi
- Jamkhed Ru.
- Rukhmina mapari

== K ==
- Kawadgaon
- Khandvi
- Kharda
- Khurdaithan
- Kusadgaon
- Kadbhanwadi
- Kolhewadi

== L ==
- Loni

== M ==
- Matewadi
- Moha
- Mohari
- Mungewadi
- Munjewadi

== N ==
- Nahuli
- Nannaj
- Nanewadi
- Naigaon

== P ==
- Padali
- Pimpalgaon Alwa
- Pimpagoan Unda
- Pimparkhed
- Potewadi
- Patoda

== R ==
- Rajewadi
- Rajuri
- Ratnapur

== S ==
- Sakat
- Sarola
- Satefal
- Sawargaon
- Shiur
- Sonegaon

== T ==
- Taradgaon
- Telangshi

== W ==
- Wagha
- Waki

== Z ==
- Zikri

== See also ==
- Jamkhed tehsil
- Tehsils in Ahmednagar
- Villages in Akole tehsil
- Villages in Karjat tehsil
- Villages in Kopargaon tehsil
- Villages in Nagar tehsil
- Villages in Nevasa tehsil
- Villages in Parner tehsil
- Villages in Pathardi tehsil
- Villages in Rahata tehsil
- Villages in Rahuri tehsil
- Villages in Sangamner tehsil
- Villages in Shevgaon tehsil
- Villages in Shrigonda tehsil
- Villages in Shrirampur tehsil
