= List of villages in Nevasa taluka =

There are around 120 villages in Nevasa tehsil of Ahmednagar district of state of Maharashtra. Following is the list of village in Nevasa tehsil.

== A ==
- Amalner
- Antarwali

== B ==
- Babhulkhede
- Bahirwadi
- Bakupimpalgaon
- Barahanpur
- Belekarwadi

- Belpandhari
- Belpimpalgaon
- Bhalgaon
- Bhanshivare
- Bhende Budruk
- Bhende Khurd

== C ==
- Chanda
- Chikni khamgaon No. 2
- Chilekhanwadi
- Chinchban (shinde patil)

== D ==
- Dedgao
- Devgao
- Devsade
- Dhangarwadi
- Dighi ( Nikam )
- Dighi - गट नं 87

== F ==
- Fattepur
- Gevrai

== G ==
- Gondegao

== H ==
- Handi Nimgao
- Hingoni

== J ==
- Jaigude Aakhad
- Jainpur
- Jalke Budaruk
- Jalke Khurd
- Jeur Haibati

== K ==
- Kangoni 105
- Karajgao
- Karegaon
- Kautha
- Khadke
- Khamgao
- Kharwandi
- Khedale Kajali
- Khedale Paramanand
- Khunegao
- Khupati
- Kukana
- Khamgaon

== L ==
- Landewadi
- Lekurwali Aakhad
- Lohogaon
- Loharwadi

== M ==
- Mahalaxmi Hivare
- Maka
- Maktapur
- Mali Chinchore
- Mande Gavhan
- Mangalapur
- Mhalaspimpalgao
- Moraya Chinchore
- Mukindpur population
- Murme
- Mhasale

== N ==
- Nagapur
- Nandur Shikari
- Narayanwadi
- Navin Chandgao
- Newasa Budruk
- Newasa Khurd
- Nijik Chincholi
- Nimbhari
- Nipani Nimagao

== P ==
- Pachegaon
- Pachunde
- Panaswadi
- Panegaon
- Patharwala
- Phatepur
- Pichadga
- Pravarasangam
- Punatgaon

== R ==
- Rajegaon
- Ramdoha
- Ranjangao
- Rastapur

== S ==
- Salabatpur
- Saundala
- Shahapur
- Shinganapur
- Shingve Tukai
- Shirasgaon
- Shiregao
- Sonai belhekar vadi
- Sukali Khurd
- Sultanpur
- Suregao Gangapur
- Sureshnagar

== T ==
- Tamaswadi
- Tarwad

i

- Telkudgaon
- Toka

== U ==
- Ustal Dumala
- Ustal Khalsa

== V ==
- Vanjarwadi
- Vanjoli
- Wadala Bahiroba
- Wadule
- Wakadi
- Warkhed
- Watapur

== Z ==
- Zapwadi

== See also ==
- Nevasa tehsil
- Tehsils in Ahmednagar
- Villages in Akole tehsil
- Villages in Jamkhed tehsil
- Villages in Karjat tehsil
- Villages in Kopargaon tehsil
- Villages in Nagar tehsil
- Villages in Parner tehsil
- Villages in Pathardi tehsil
- Villages in Rahata tehsil
- Villages in Rahuri tehsil
- Villages in Sangamner tehsil
- Villages in Shevgaon tehsil
- Villages in Shrigonda tehsil
- Villages in Shrirampur tehsil
