= Treaty of Mungi-Shevgaon =

1728 treaty between Hyderabad and Maratha

- Context: Signed to protect Sambhaji II of Kolhapur from the Marathas under Bajirao I and for the safe retirement of the Nizam's army.
- Signed: 6 March 1728
- Location: Shevgaon
- Signatories: (Hyderabad State) Asaf Jah I; Shahu I
- Parties: (Hyderabad State) Hyderabad; Maratha Empire

Full text
- Treaty of Mungi-Shevgaon at Wikisource

The Treaty of Mungi-Shevgaon was signed on 6 March 1728, between Bajirao I of the Maratha Empire and the Nizam of Hyderabad, Asaf Jah I, in what is present-day Shevgaon. According to the terms of the treaty, the Nizam granted the Marathas the authority to collect Chauth, a type of tax, from the six Subahs located in the Deccan region. Additionally, the treaty recognized Shahu I as the Emperor of the Maratha Empire, and in return, the Maratha Emperor agreed not to apprehend Sambhaji II, who had allied himself with the Nizam against the Emperor.

== Background ==
The seeds of this battle date back to the year 1713 when Maratha king Shahu I appointed Balaji Vishwanath as his Peshwa, or Prime Minister. In 1724, Mughal control waned, and Asaf Jah I, the first Nizam of Hyderabad, proclaimed independence from Mughal rule, thus establishing his own kingdom, which came to be known as Hyderabad Deccan. The Nizam aimed to strengthen his province by curbing the increasing influence of the Marathas. He took advantage of the growing division within the Maratha Empire, as both Shahu and Sambhaji II of Kolhapur claimed the title of King. The Nizam chose to support the faction led by Sambhaji II, which angered Shahu, who had also declared himself King. Additionally, the Nizam decided to stop the payment of Chauth, which had been agreed upon by many landowners in the Deccan province to the Marathas, as per the arrangement made by the Syed Brothers in 1719.

== Campaigns of Bajirao and Nizam ==
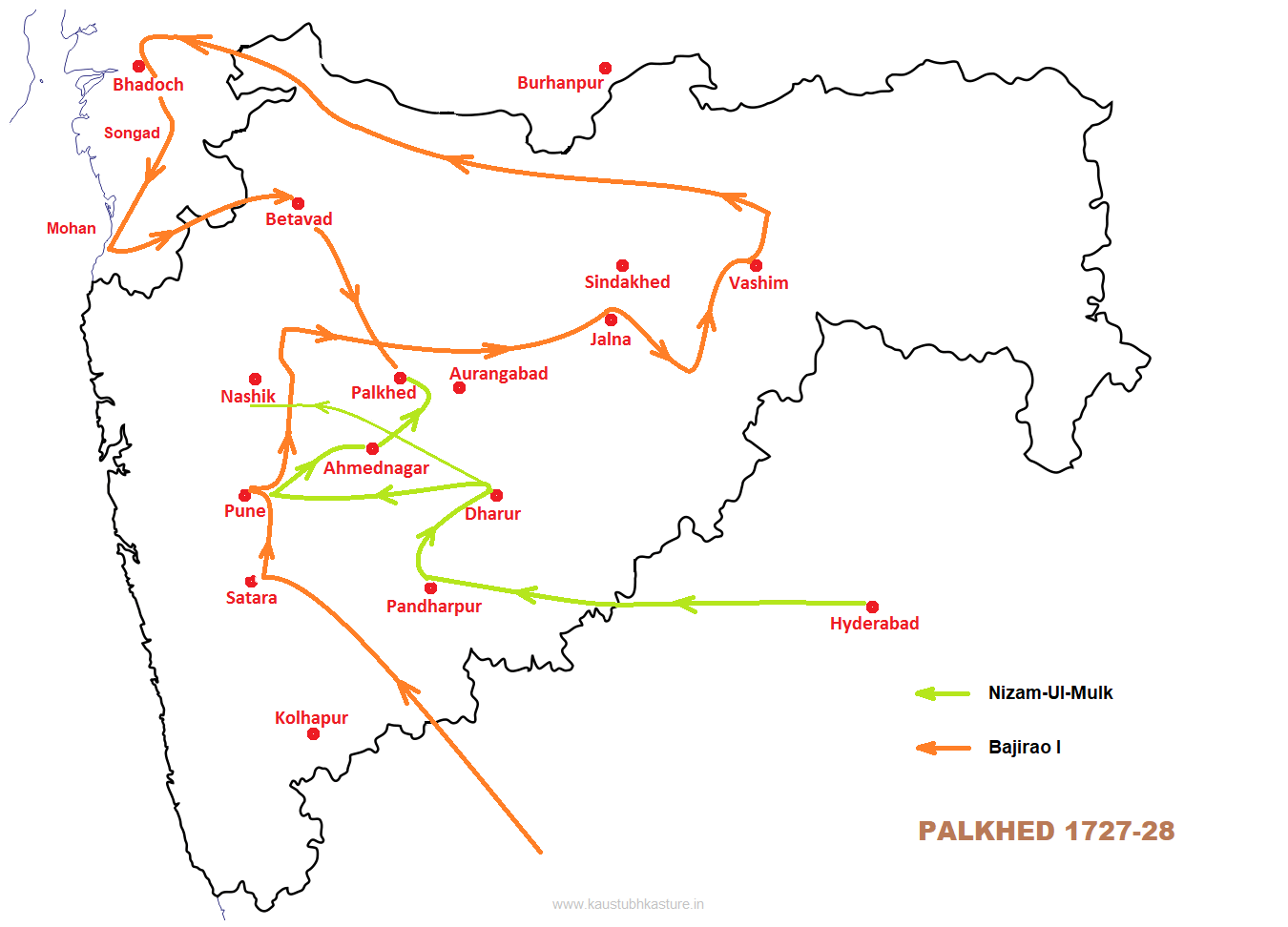
Troop movements of Baji Rao I and Nizam-ul-Mulk before the treaty of Mungi Shevgaon

The battle strategy unfolded as Baji Rao's army retreated from the southern regions of the Maratha empire in May 1727. Shortly afterward, Shahu ended negotiations with Nizam-ul-Mulk regarding the restoration of the Chauth.

Over the course of approximately six months, the Nizam chased Baji Rao's army in the Pune area. During this time, Baji Rao employed a series of tactical maneuvers, leading to the eventual encirclement and cornering of the Nizam's forces at Palkhed.

Baji Rao and the Maratha armies were summoned back from their campaign in Karnataka. In May 1727, Baji Rao requested Shahu to terminate negotiations with Nizam-ul-Mulk, Asaf Jah I, who had proposed arbitration regarding the payment of Chauth and sardeshmukhi. Baji Rao then began the process of mobilizing an army.

With the monsoon season concluded and the terrain favorable for the upcoming campaign, Baji Rao's forces advanced towards Aurangabad.

Following a skirmish near Jalna, where the Marathas continued their strategy of avoiding direct confrontation with the enemy, Baji Rao, as expected, withdrew from the battlefield and redirected his forces toward Burhanpur.

Nizam-ul-Mulk's army initially pursued Baji Rao, but Baji Rao changed his course and moved westward into Gujarat from North Khandesh. Surprisingly, the Nizam-ul-Mulk decided to abandon the pursuit and instead headed southward toward Pune. Sambhaji II accompanied the Nizam during this movement. Upon learning of the situation, Baji Rao quickly moved toward Pune and arrived at the Nizam's camp. The Marathas then encircled the camp, effectively cutting off the supply lines to the Nizam's forces. The shortage of food supplies, caused by the Marathas surrounding Nizam's camp, played a crucial role in his decision to sign a treaty with them.

== The treaty ==
Baji Rao and the Nizam initiated negotiations, during which Baji Rao proposed the retirement of the Maratha army in exchange for Nizam handing over Sambhaji II to him. However, the Nizam declined this offer and instead, they forged a treaty that granted the Marathas the right to collect taxes (known as Chauth) from the six Subahs of Hyderabad. This arrangement was made in order to safeguard their ally, Shambaji II. The Nizam of Hyderabad and Baji Rao I signed a peace treaty on 6 March 1728 at the village of Mungi-Paithan. According to the treaty:

By the treaty of Mungi-Shivagaon, the Nizam agreed to make certain concessions to the Peshwa.

1. Chhatrapati Shahu was recognised as the sole Maratha ruler.
2. Marathas were given the right to collect Chauth and Sardeshmukhi of Deccan Subahs.
3. The Marathas agreed not to capture Shambhaji II and allowed him to remain free.
4. The balance revenue was to be paid to Chhatrapati Shahu.
