= Karjat taluka =

Karjat taluka may refer to:

- Karjat taluka, Ahmednagar, a taluka in Karjat subdivision of Ahmednagar district, India
- Karjat taluka, Raigad, a subdistrict / upazila / tehsil in Raigad district, India
