= Sarala, Ahmednagar =

Village in Maharashtra

Sarala
- village
- Location in Maharashtra, India
- Coordinates: 19°45′06″N 74°43′49″E
- Country: India
- State: Maharashtra
- District: Ahmednagar
- Taluka: Shrirampur

Government
  - Body: Grampanchayat

Population (2011)
  - Total: 1,261

Languages
  - Official: Marathi
- Time zone: UTC+5:30 (IST)
- PIN: 413718
- Telephone code: 02422
- Vehicle registration: MH-17

Sarala is a village in Shrirampur taluka of Ahmednagar district in Indian state of Maharashtra. Village is famous for Samadhi of Sant Gangageer Maharaj.

== Location ==
Sarala is situated north of Shrirampur taluka on the banks of Godavari River. Village shares boundary with Aurangabad district.

== Demographics ==
As per 2011 census, population of Sarala is 1261. Male constitute 657 and female constitute 604.

== Economy ==
Agriculture and allied work are source of income.
