= Sarala =

Sarala may refer to:

== People ==
- Kovai Sarala, Indian actress
- Sarala Dasa, Oriya poet and scholar
- Sarala Devi Chaudhurani (1872–1945), founder of Bharat Stree Mahamandal
- Sarala Devi (1904–1986), Indian activist, feminist, and writer
- Sarala Kariyawasam, Sri Lankan actress
- Sarala Regmi, Nepalese politician
- Sarala Roy (died 1946), Indian educationist
- Sarala Yeolekar, veteran actress of Marathi, Hindi, and Gujarati Cinema

== Other ==
- Sarala, Ahmednagar, Shrirampur, Ahmednagar, Maharashtra
- Sarala (film), a 1936 Indian film
- Sarala Temple, a Hindu Temple in Jagatsinghpur, Orissa
