= Jamkhed taluka =

- Tehsil
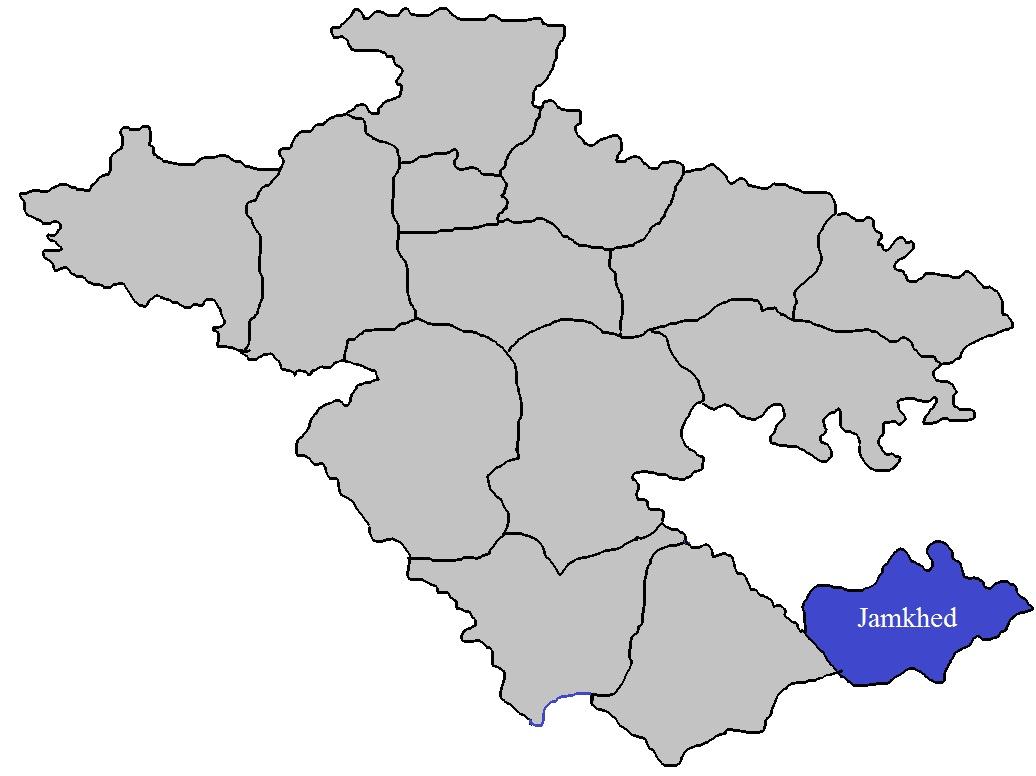
- Location of Jamkhed in Ahmednagar district in Maharashtra
- Country: India
- State: Maharashtra
- District: Ahmednagar
- Headquarters: Karjat

Area
  - Total: 878.62 km^{2} (339.24 sq mi)

Population (2011)
  - Total: 158,380
  - Density: 180.26/km^{2} (466.87/sq mi)

Demographics
  - Literacy rate: 63.69%
  - Sex ratio: 1.05 ♂/♀
- Website: Official website

Jamkhed taluka, is a taluka in Karjat subdivision of Ahmednagar district in Maharashtra State of India.

== Area ==
Area by land type
Type of Land	Percent
Agriculture	83.6%
Forest	4.29%
Other	12.11%

The table below shows area of the taluka by land type.

Type of Land	Area (km^{2})	% of Total Area
Agriculture	734.5	83.6
Forest	37.72	4.29
Other	106.4	12.11
Total	878.62	100

== Villages ==
There are around 88 villages in Jamkhed taluka. For list of villages see Villages in Jamkhed taluka.

== Population ==
Religions in Jamkhed taluk (2011)
Religion	Percent
Hinduism	89.71%
Islam	7.99%
Buddhism	1.14%
Jainism	0.87%
Other or not stated	0.29%

Jamkhed taluka has a population of 158,380 according to the 2011 census. Jamkhed had a literacy rate of 63.69% and a sex ratio of 920 females per 1000 males. 34,017 (21.48%) lived in urban areas. Scheduled Castes and Scheduled Tribes make up 12.99% and 1.43% of the population respectively.

Languages of Jamkhed taluk (2011)
1. Marathi (90.1%)
2. Hindi (3.87%)
3. Urdu (3.67%)
4. Others (2.37%)

At the time of the 2011 Census of India, 90.09% of the population in the district spoke Marathi, 3.87% Hindi and 3.67% Urdu as their first language.

== Rain Fall ==
The Table below details of rainfall from year 1981 to 2004.

Year	Rainfall (mm)
1981	527
1982	555
1983	1341
1984	727
1985	540
1986	872
1987	996
1988	1040
1989	920
1990	523
1991	480
1993	823
1994	583.3
1995	570
1996	922
1997	427
1998	1070
1999	409
2000	661
2001	333
2002	561
2003	460
2004	570

== See also ==
- Talukas in Ahmednagar district
- Villages in Jamkhed taluka
