= Khandgaon (Sangamner) =

Village in Maharashtra

Khandgaon (Kandeshwar)
- village
- Nickname: Kandeshwar
- Location in Maharashtra, India Khandgaon (Kandeshwar) (India)
- Coordinates: 19.5388°N 74.1874°E
- Country: India
- State: Maharashtra
- District: Ahmadnagar
- Taluka: Sangamner

Government
  - Body: Village Panchayat

Population (2011)
  - Total: 6,000

Languages
  - Official: Marathi
- Time zone: UTC+5:30 (IST)
- PIN: 422605
- Lok Sabha constituency: Shirdi
- Vidhan Sabha constituency: Sangamner

Khandgaon, is a small village in Sangamner Taluka in Ahmednagar District of Maharashtra State, India. It belongs to Shirdi Area and Northern Maharashtra region. It belongs to Nashik Division. It is located 87 km towards west from District headquarters Ahmednagar, 3 km from Sangamner, 176 km from State capital Mumbai.
