= Shevgaon taluka =

- Tehsil
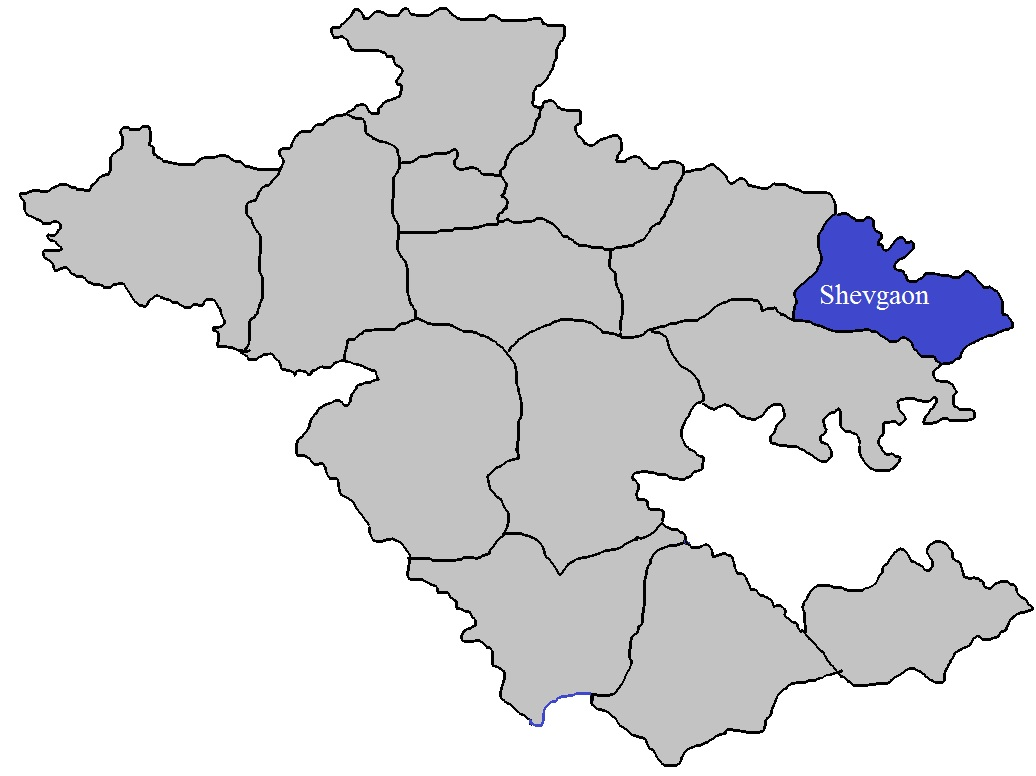
- Location of Shevgaon in Ahmednagar district in Maharashtra
- Country: India
- State: Maharashtra
- District: Ahmednagar district
- Headquarters: Ahmednagar

Area
  - Total: 1,031.85 km^{2} (398.40 sq mi)

Population (2011)
  - Total: 245,714
  - Density: 238.130/km^{2} (616.753/sq mi)

Shevgaon taluka is a taluka in Ahmednagar subdivision of Ahmednagar district in Maharashtra state of India.

== Area ==
The table below shows area of the taluka by land type.

Type of Land	Area (km^{2})	% of Total Area
Agriculture	913.19	88.5
Forest	11.57	1.12
Other	107.09	10.38
Total	1031.85	100

== Villages ==
There are around 112 villages in Shevgaon taluka. For list of villages see Villages in Shevgaon taluka.

== Population ==
Religions in Shevgaon taluk (2011)
Religion	Percent
Hinduism	90.65%
Islam	7.93%
Buddhism	0.42%
Other or not stated	1.00%

Shevgaon taluka has a population of 245,714 according to the 2011 census. Shevgaon had a literacy rate of 73.94% and a sex ratio of 953 females per 1000 males. The entire population lives in rural areas. Scheduled Castes and Scheduled Tribes make up 14.72% and 1.91% of the population respectively.

Languages of Shevgaon taluk (2011)
1. Marathi (89.9%)
2. Hindi (4.41%)
3. Urdu (3.30%)
4. Vadari (0.98%)
5. Others (1.43%)

At the time of the 2011 Census of India, 89.88% of the population in the district spoke Marathi, 4.41% Hindi, 3.30% Urdu and 0.98% Vadari as their first language.

== Rain Fall ==
The table below details rainfall from 1981 to 2004.

Year	Rainfall (mm)		
1981	-	1982	407
1983	563		
1984	309		
1985	247		
1986	422		
1987	596		
1988	824		
1989	730		
1990	697		
1991	391		
1992	369		
1993	519		
1994	584.6		
1995	363		
1996	782		
1997	226		
1998	780		
1999	366		
2000	531		
2001	349		
2002	449		
2003	320		
2004	715		

== See also ==
- Talukas in Ahmednagar district
- Murashatpur
- (Swayambu Ganesh Mandir -Avhane B.K.)
- Shri Maruti Mandir Garadwadi

095270 44983 https://www.google.com/maps?cid=10184565873800887938)
