= Kharadi, Sangamner =

Kharadi
- village
- Location in Maharashtra, India Kharadi (India)
- Coordinates: 19.5425°N 74.2443°E
- Country: India
- State: Maharashtra
- District: Ahmadnagar
- Taluka: Sangamner

Government
  - Body: Village Panchayat

Languages
  - Official: Marathi
- Time zone: UTC+5:30 (IST)
- Lok Sabha constituency: Shirdi
- Vidhan Sabha constituency: Sangamner

Kharadi village is located in Sangamner Tehsil of Ahmadnagar district in Maharashtra, India. It is situated 7 km away from sub-district headquarter Sangamner and 105 km away from district headquarter Ahmadnagar. As per 2009 stats, Kharadi village is also a gram panchayat. The total geographical area of village is 558.25 hectares. Kharadi has a total population of 2,036 peoples. There are about 385 houses in Kharadi village. As per 2019 stats, Kharadi villages comes under Sangamner assembly & Shirdi parliamentary constituency. Sangamner is nearest town to Kharadi which is approximately 7 km away.
