= Kuran (Sangamner) =

- village
- Location in Maharashtra, India Kuran (India)
- Coordinates: 19.61489°N 74.237558°E
- Country: India
- State: Maharashtra
- District: Ahmadnagar
- Taluka: Sangamner

Government
  - Body: Village Panchayat

Languages
  - Official: Marathi
- Time zone: UTC+5:30 (IST)
- Lok Sabha constituency: Shirdi
- Vidhan Sabha constituency: Sangamner

Kuran village is located in Sangamner Tehsil of Ahmadnagar district in Maharashtra, India. The postal code of this place is 422605. It is situated 6 km away from sub-district headquarter Sangamner and 105 km away from district headquarter Ahmadnagar. As per 2009 stats, Kuran village is also a gram panchayat. The total geographical area of the village is 1073 hectares. Kuran has a total population of 4,417 peoples of which 2313 are males while 2104 are females as per Population Census 2011. There are about 670 houses in Kuran village. As per 2019 stats, Kuran villages come under the Sangamner assembly & Shirdi parliamentary constituency. Sangamner is the nearest town to Kuran which is approximately 6 km away.
