= Kopargaon taluka =

- Tehsil
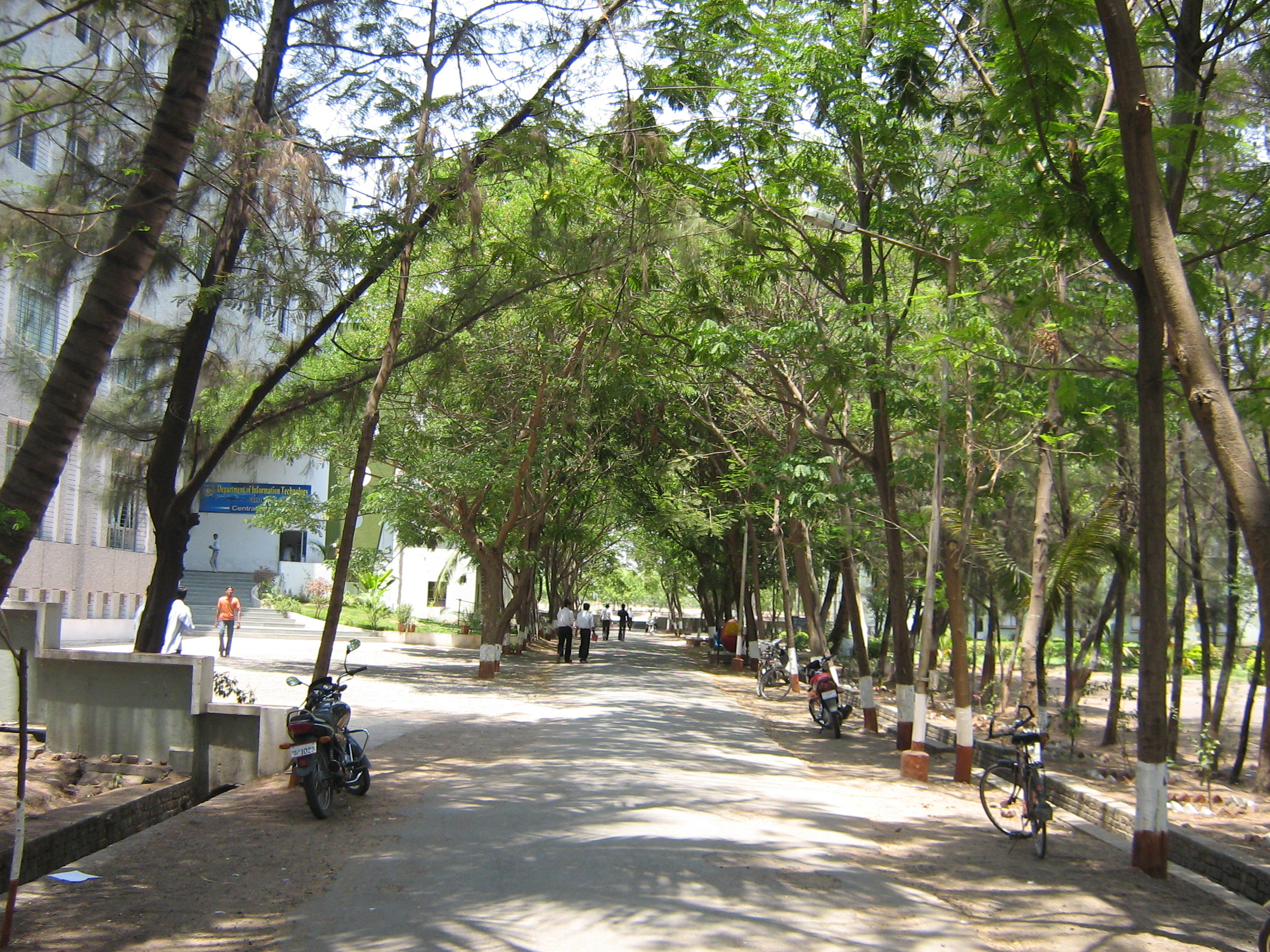
- Sanjivani College of Engineering in Kopargaon

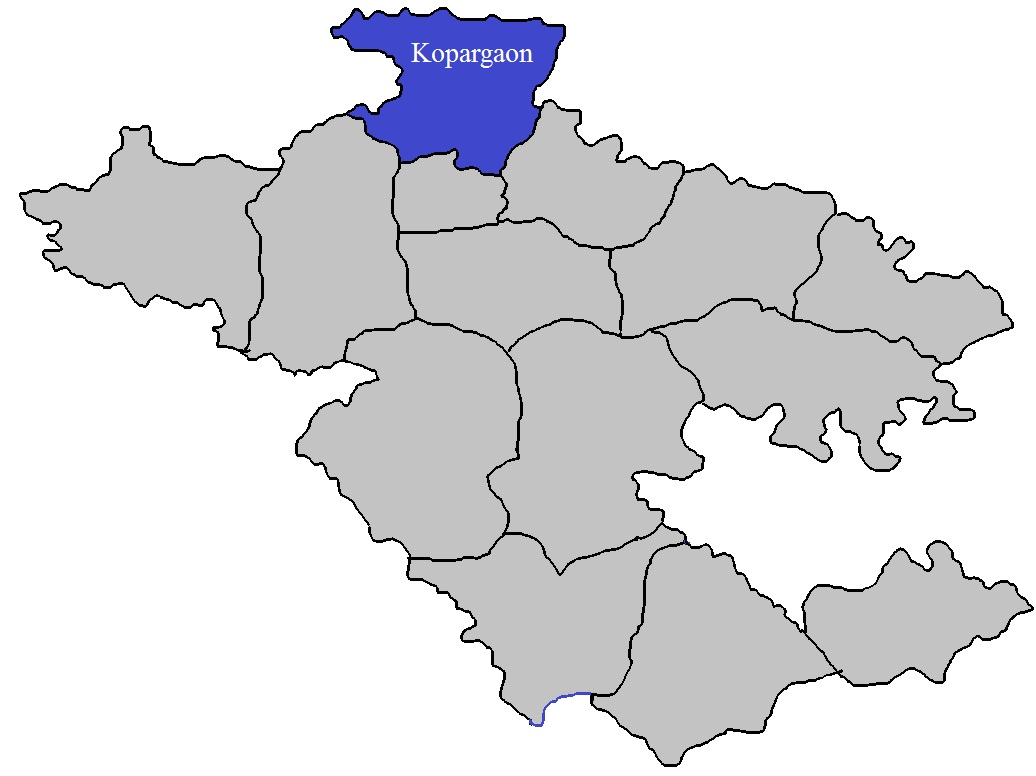
- Location of Kopargaon in Ahmednagar district in Maharashtra
- Country: India
- State: Maharashtra
- District: Ahmednagar
- Headquarters: Kopargaon

Area
  - Total: 725.16 km^{2} (279.99 sq mi)

Population (2011)
  - Total: 302,452
  - Density: 417.08/km^{2} (1,080.2/sq mi)

Demographics
  - Literacy rate: 85.08
  - Sex ratio: 965

Kopargaon taluka is a taluka in Shirdi subdivision of Ahmednagar district in Maharashtra state of India.

== Area ==
The table below shows area of the taluka by land type.

Type of Land	Area (km^{2})	% of Total Area
Agriculture	686.47	94.66
Forest	0	0
Other	38.69	5.34
Total	725.16	100

== Villages ==
There are around 79 villages in Kopargaon taluka. For a list of villages see Villages in Kopargaon taluka. Major villages include Karanji bk, Kolapewadi, Manjur, Chas Nali, Sanwaster, Pohegaon, Dhamori, Dauch Khurd, Sangvi Bhusar, and Rawanda.

== Population ==
Religions in Kopargaon taluk (2011)
Religion	Percent
Hinduism	89.67%
Islam	7.55%
Buddhism	1.35%
Jainism	0.77%
Other or not stated	0.66%

Kopargaon taluka has a population of 302,452 according to the 2011 census. Kopargaon had a literacy rate of 69.75% and a sex ratio of 942 females per 1000 males. 65,273 (21.58%) lived in urban areas. Scheduled Castes and Scheduled Tribes make up 13.36% and 11.37% of the population respectively.

Languages of Kopargaon taluk (2011)
1. Marathi (88.9%)
2. Hindi (5.26%)
3. Urdu (3.01%)
4. Others (2.87%)

At the time of the 2011 Census of India, 88.86% of the population in the district spoke Marathi, 5.26% Hindi and 3.01% Urdu as their first language.

== Rainfall ==
The Table below details rainfall from 1981 to 2004.

Year	Rainfall (mm)
1981	421
1982	389
1983	531
1984	518
1985	300
1986	319
1987	460
1988	575
1989	594
1990	499
1991	296
1992	418
1993	408
1994	440.2
1995	321
1996	537
1997	290
1998	582
1999	384
2000	428
2001	360
2002	366
2003	280
2004	400

== See also ==
- Talukas in Ahmednagar district
- Villages in Kopargaon taluka
