= Kolpewadi =

Village in Maharashtra

Coordinates: 19.9292°N 74.3617°E

Kolpewadi is a village in Kopargaon taluka, Ahmednagar district, Maharashtra, India. It is located about 27 kilometres (17 mi) from Shirdi (Saibaba) and 78 kilometres (48 mi) from Nasik. 114 kilometres (71 mi) north of the district headquarters of Ahmednagar and 220 kilometres (140 mi) from the state capital at Mumbai, it is a part of Northern Maharashtra region and Nashik division. Kolpewadi had a population of 5449, of whom 2787 were male and 2662 female, at the time of the 2011 Census of India. There were 742 children aged 0–6, being 13.62% of the total population. The Average Sex Ratio was 955, which was higher than the Maharashtra state average of 929. The Child Sex Ratio was 878, lower than the Maharashtra average of 894. 2318 people were engaged in work activities. 93.57% of workers describe their work as Main Work (Employment or Earning more than 6 Months) while 6.43% were involved in Marginal activity providing livelihood for less than 6 months. Of the 2318 workers, 489 were cultivators (owner or co-owner) while 1001 were agricultural labourers. Scheduled Tribes constituted 6.39% of to populate and Scheduled Castes were 6.09%.

Kolpewadi is administered by a Sarpanch (Head of Village) who is an elected representative. Its Pincode is 423602. Its STD code is 02423.

History:

Many years ago, a dhanagar was arrived to a small hill with sheep and goats in search of food. He liked this place and decided to stay on the hill. Then he blessed with 4 sons. Every son then extended their family and now we are few thousands in number. We have 4 "Wada's" which are extended families of 4 sons. Kolpe is last name of all successors and Kolpewadi is name of the village.Kolpes Dominating Surname in Kopergaon.

Population Statistics Kolpewadi Data Particulars Total Male Female Total No. of Houses 1,075 - - Population 5,449 2,787 2,662 Child (0-6) 742 395 347 Schedule Caste 332 167 165 Schedule Tribe 348 172 176 Literacy 72.70% 82.73% 62.33% Total Workers 2,318 1,493 825 Main Worker 2,169 - - Marginal Worker 149 61 88

== Agricultural ==
Sugarcane, wheat are popular crops.

== Education ==
- Shri Chhatrapati Sambhaji Prathamik Vidyalay
- Shri Chhatrapati Shivaji Vidyalay and Jr. College
- Gautam Polytechnic Institute
- Radhabai Kale Kanya Vidyamandir
- Swami Samarth Nursing College
- Saibaba Nursing School
