= Konchi, Sangamner =

Village in Maharashtra

Konchi
- village
- Location in Maharashtra, India Konchi (India)
- Coordinates: 19.5945°N 74.3412°E
- Country: India
- State: Maharashtra
- District: Ahmadnagar
- Taluka: Sangamner

Government
  - Body: Village Panchayat

Languages
  - Official: Marathi
- Time zone: UTC+5:30 (IST)
- Lok Sabha constituency: Shirdi
- Vidhan Sabha constituency: Sangamner

Konchi is a small Village/hamlet in Sangamner Taluka in Ahmednagar District of Maharashtra State, India. It comes under Konchi Panchayath. It belongs to Khandesh and Northern Maharashtra region . It belongs to Nashik Division . It is located 79 KM towards North from District head quarters Ahmednagar. 16 KM from Sangamner. 197 KM from State capital Mumbai.
