= Mahalwadi =

Village in Maharashtra

- village
- Location in Maharashtra, India Mahalwadi (India)
- Coordinates: 19.61489°N 74.237558°E
- Country: India
- State: Maharashtra
- District: Ahmadnagar
- Taluka: Sangamner

Government
  - Body: Village Panchayat

Languages
  - Official: Marathi
- Time zone: UTC+5:30 (IST)
- Lok Sabha constituency: Shirdi
- Vidhan Sabha constituency: Sangamner

Mahalwadi village is located in Sangamner Tehsil of Ahmadnagar district in Maharashtra, India. Sangamner is nearest town to Mahalwadi which is approximately 29 km away. As per 2019 stats, Mahalwadi villages comes under Akole assembly & Shirdi parliamentary constituency.
