= Kharshinde =

- village
- Location in Maharashtra, India Kharshinde (India)
- Coordinates: 19.4628°N 74.4233°E
- Country: India
- State: Maharashtra
- District: Ahmadnagar
- Taluka: Sangamner

Government
  - Body: Village Panchayat

Languages
  - Official: Marathi
- Time zone: UTC+5:30 (IST)
- Lok Sabha constituency: Shirdi
- Vidhan Sabha constituency: Sangamner

Kharshinde village is located in Sangamner Tehsil of Ahmadnagar district in Maharashtra, India. It is situated 38 km away from sub-district headquarter Sangamner and 80 km away from district headquarters Ahmadnagar. As per 2009 stats, Kharshinde village is also a gram panchayat. The total geographical area of the village is 899.42 hectares. Kharshinde has a total population of 1,155 peoples. There are about 228 houses in Kharshinde village. As per 2019 stats, Kharshinde villages comes under Sangamner assembly & Shirdi parliamentary constituency. Sangamner is the nearest town to Kharshinde which is approximately 38 km away.
