= Chichondi Patil =

Village in Maharashtra, India

Chichondi Patil चिचोंडी पाटील
- Village
- Location in Maharashtra, India Chichondi Patil (India)
- Coordinates: 19°00′N 74°55′E
- Country: India
- State: Maharashtra
- District: Ahmednagar

Government
  - Type: Grampanchayat

Area
  - Total: 4,200 km^{2} (1,600 sq mi)

Languages
  - Official: Marathi
- Time zone: UTC+5:30 (IST)
- Vehicle registration: MH 16

Chichondi Patil (Village ID 558115) is a village with a hot and dry climate with thorny and deciduous vegetation. Agriculture is mainly dependent on monsoon rain during months of June to September. People of the village are dependent on farming and animal husbandry for their earnings. Small scale manufacturing and service sector activities also part of economic activities of the village. According to the 2011 census, it has a population of 6147 living in 1364 households.

Traces of old fortification around the village can be found through remains of 2 fortification wall gates in the Dayra area and in the ground of the new English school. The small castle type structure in Patil Lane is also a place of attraction but now counting its last days. The village is the border village between Ahemadnagar and Beed district.
