= Nagar taluka =

- Tehsil
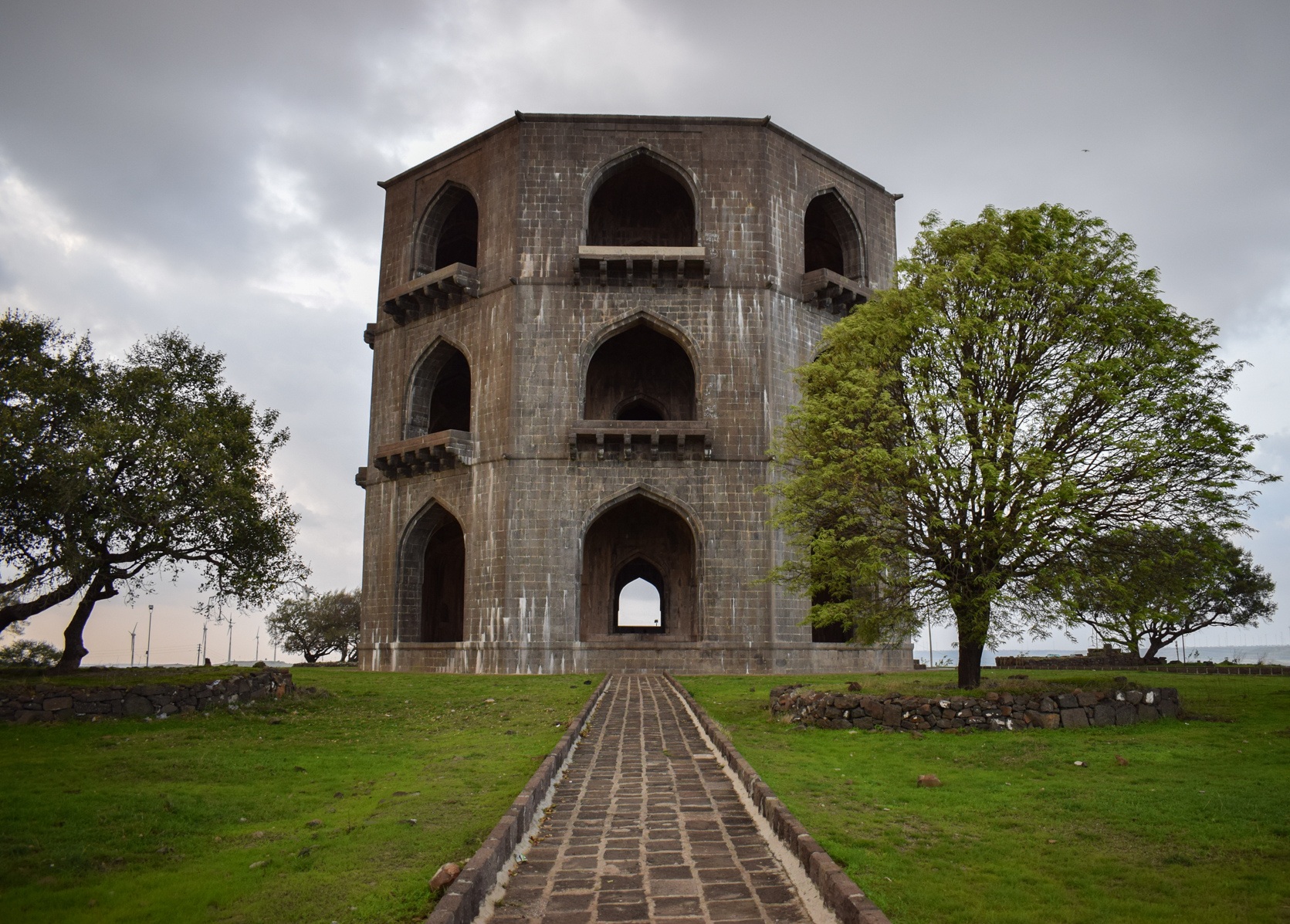
- Tomb of Salabat Khan II

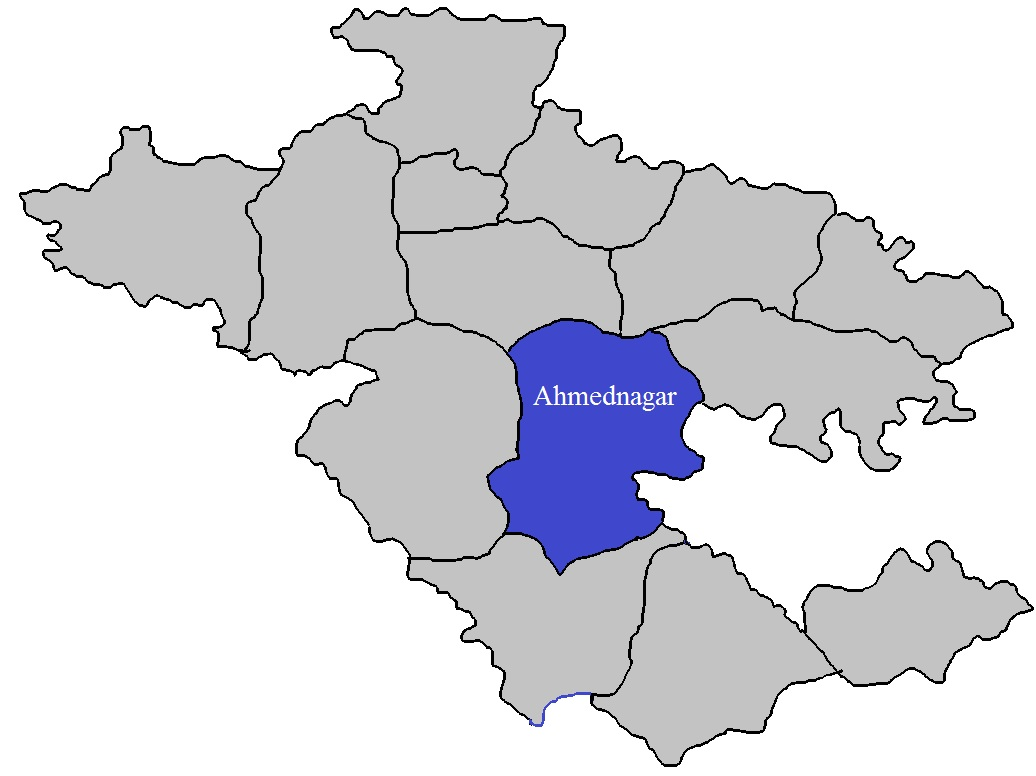
- Location of Nagar in Ahmednagar district in Maharashtra
- Country: India
- State: Maharashtra
- District: Ahmednagar district
- Headquarters: Ahmednagar

Area
  - Total: 1,605.74 km^{2} (619.98 sq mi)

Population (2011)
  - Total: 684,044
  - Density: 425.999/km^{2} (1,103.33/sq mi)

Nagar taluka is a taluka in Ahmednagar subdivision of Ahmednagar district in Maharashtra state of India.

== Area ==
The table below shows area of the taluka by land type.

Type of Land	Area (km^{2})	% of Total Area
Agriculture	1376.64	85.73
Forest	131.65	8.2
Other	97.45	6.07
Total	1605.74	100

== Villages ==
There are around 117 villages in Nagar taluka. For list of villages see Villages in Nagar taluka.

== Population ==
Religions in Nagar taluk (2011)
Religion	Percent
Hinduism	83.51%
Islam	10.95%
Jainism	2.39%
Christianity	1.61%
Buddhism	0.76%
Other or not stated	0.78%

Nagar taluka has a population of 684,044 according to the 2011 census. Nagar had a literacy rate of 86.35% and a sex ratio of 931 females per 1000 males. 428,182 (62.60%) lived in urban areas. Scheduled Castes and Scheduled Tribes make up 14.18% and 2.10% of the population respectively.

Languages of Nagar taluk (2011)
1. Marathi (77.0%)
2. Hindi (8.31%)
3. Urdu (5.35%)
4. Telugu (2.77%)
5. Marwari (2.36%)
6. Others (4.20%)

At the time of the 2011 Census of India, 77.01% of the population in the district spoke Marathi, 8.31% Hindi, 5.35% Urdu, 2.77% Telugu and 2.36% Marwari as their first language.

== Rain Fall ==
The table below details rainfall from 1981 to 2004.

Year	Rainfall (mm)
1981	639
1982	520
1983	786
1984	497
1985	400
1986	498
1987	827
1988	772
1989	914
1990	1446
1991	950
1992	572
1993	655
1994	531.1
1995	372
1996	710
1997	347
1998	730
1999	479
2000	580
2001	380
2002	394
2003	199
2004	518

== See also ==
- Talukas in Ahmednagar district
- Villages in Nagar taluka
