= Waddar =

Caste

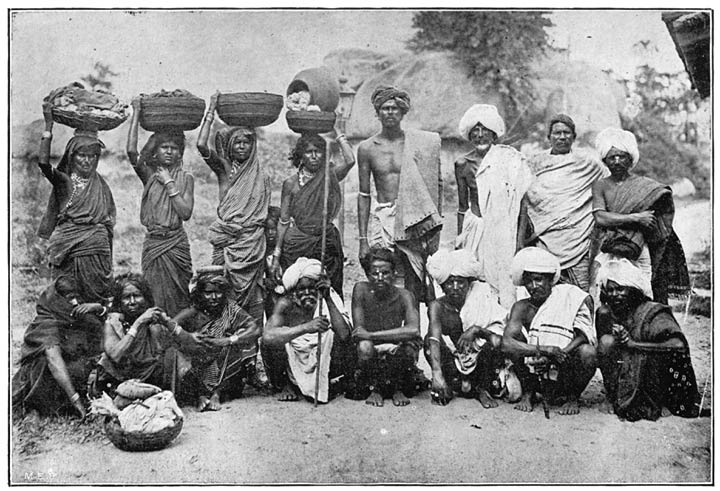
Group of Waddars with construction equipment, taken for Edgar Thurston's Castes and Tribes of Southern India in 1909

Waddar is a caste of Hinduism in India. Waddar, sometimes called Vodra, Odde, or Boyi, is a community from the Deccan Plateau whose traditional occupation is construction. Their major concentration is in Maharashtra, but there are also populations in northern Karnataka, Telangana and Andhra Pradesh.

There is no certain knowledge of their origins. Colonial scholars, including Edgar Thurston, believed the name Vodra derives from Odra-desha, the old name for Odisha, and thus they must have come from there. However the theory is only based on a speculation of the etymology of their name. In support of this, Thurston mentioned they had another language besides Telugu that could be related to Odia, but no other scholars have reported it. The Waddars may also originate from Andhra Pradesh and Telangana due to their speaking a dialect of Telugu. A community that has a nomadic lifestyle, the Waddars commonly engage in foundation laying and stonecutting.

The Waddars have traditionally been migratory. They were placed under the Criminal Tribes Act by the British. Their first caste association was formed in Chitradurga, Karnataka in 1940. They were later classified as a Denotified Tribe in Maharashtra. They traditionally do most construction, especially stone-crushing, earth-digging and similar jobs. Nowadays they are classified as a Backward Class in Andhra Pradesh, Telangana and as a Scheduled Caste in Karnataka. In Karnataka, their population was c. 11 lakh, spread throughout the non-coastal districts of the state.

The Waddar traditionally had no restrictions on eating and drinking and had few restrictions relating to marriage. Thurston claimed that the blessing of a woman married seven times at a wedding in the Waddar community was considered auspicious.

In 2019, when large parts of Karnataka faced droughts, the community were the predominant group employed in digging wells.

They speak the Waddar language, related to Telugu. The Marathi director Nagaraj Manjule is from this community.
