= Velapur =

Village in Maharashtra

Velapur is a village in Kopargaon taluka (tahsil), Ahmednagar district, Maharashtra, India. Its Pincode is 423602. Its STD code is 02423.

== Agriculture ==
Most people of Velapur are farmers. Popular crops are sugarcane, wheat, and onions.
