= Karjat taluka, Ahmednagar =

Coordinates: 18°33′4″N 75°0′38″E

Karjat taluka
- Taluka
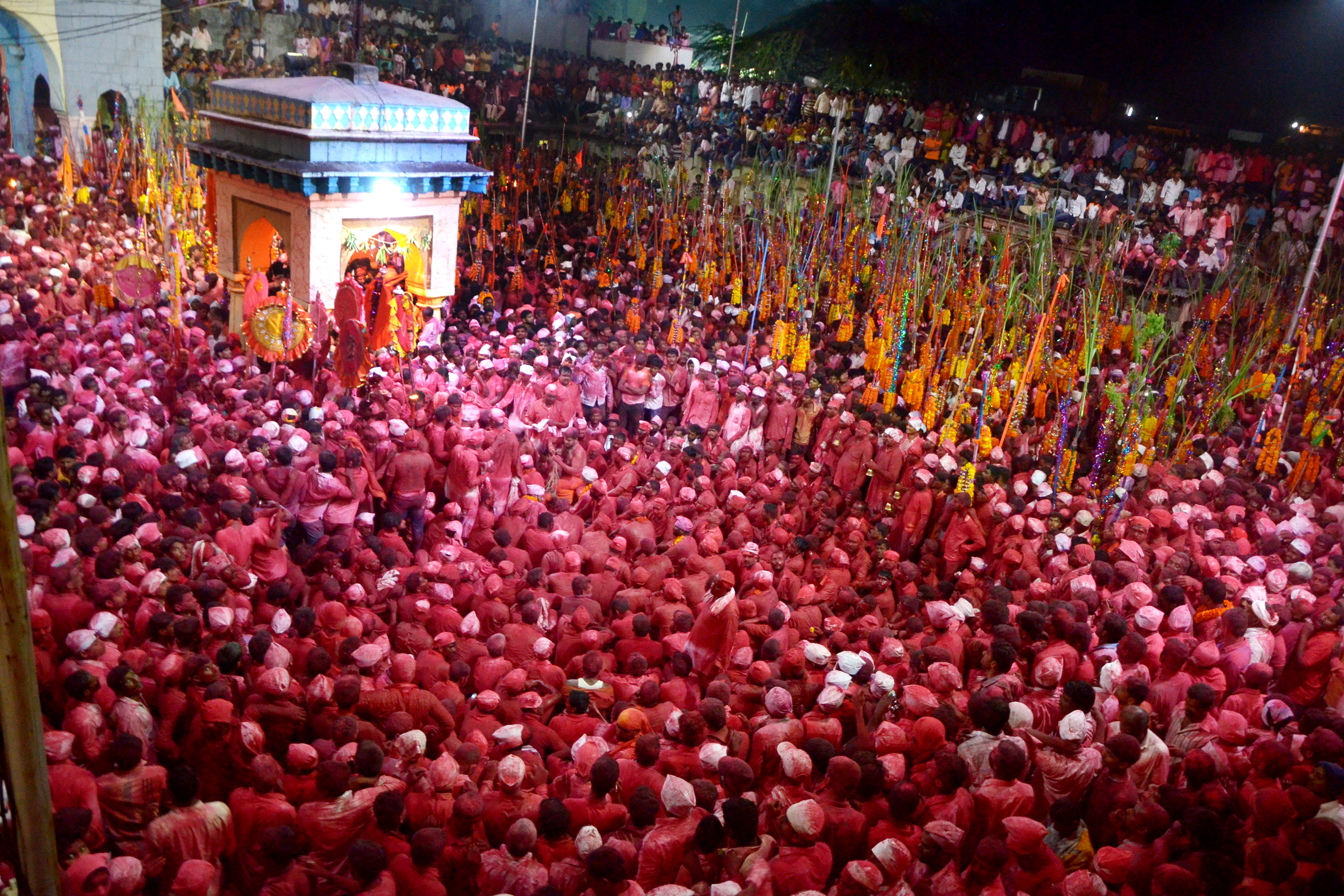
- Shree Jagdamba Devi Sohla Rashin

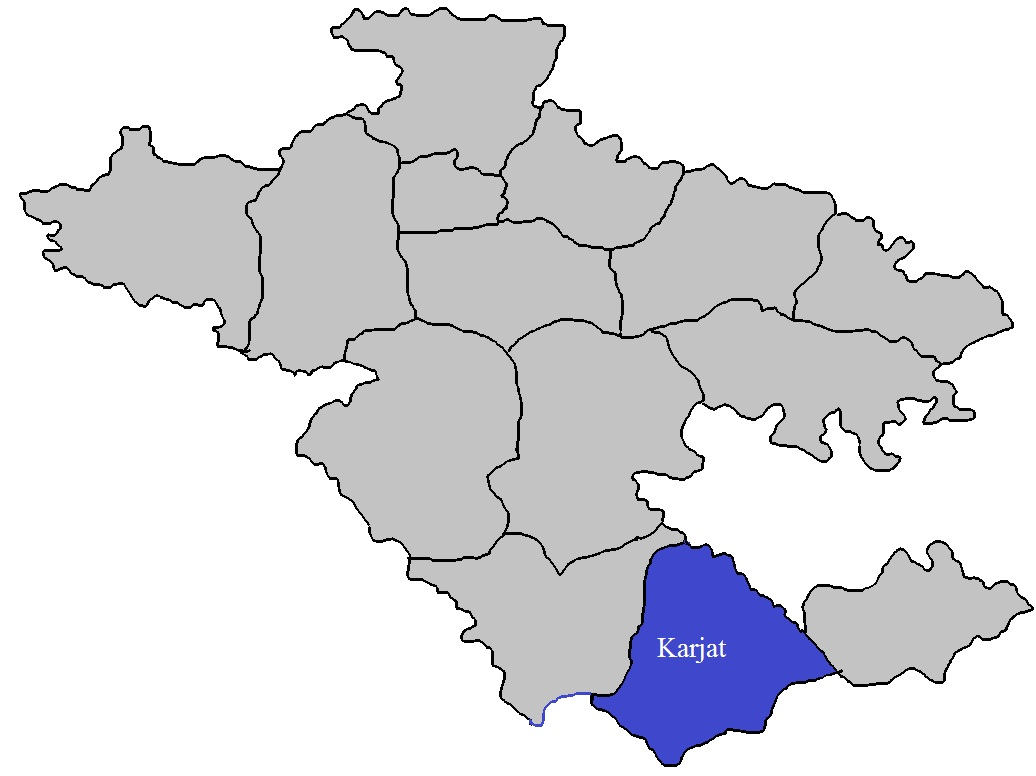
- Location of Karjat in Ahmednagar in Maharashtra
- Country: India
- State: Maharashtra
- District: Ahmednagar
- Headquarters: Karjat

Area
  - Total: 1,503.61 km^{2} (580.55 sq mi)

Population (2011)
  - Total: 235,792
  - Density: 156.817/km^{2} (406.155/sq mi)

Karjat taluka is a taluka in Karjat subdivision of Ahmednagar district in Maharashtra state of western India.

== Area ==
The table below shows area of the taluka by land type.

Type of Land	Area (km^{2})	% of Total Area
Agriculture	1147.52	76.32
Forest	130.68	8.69
Other	225.41	14.99
Total	1503.61	100

== Villages ==
There are around 118 villages in Karjat taluka.

== Population ==
Religions in Karjat taluk (2011)
Religion	Percent
Hinduism	94.80%
Islam	3.62%
Buddhism	0.74%
Jainism	0.60%
Other or not stated	0.24%

Karjat taluka has a population of 235,792 according to the 2011 census. Karjat had a literacy rate of 65.33% and a sex ratio of 914 females per 1000 males. 11,659 (4.94%) lived in urban areas. Scheduled Castes and Scheduled Tribes make up 14.40% and 1.47% of the population respectively.

Languages of Karjat taluk (2011)
1. Marathi (95.8%)
2. Hindi (2.69%)
3. Others (1.50%)

At the time of the 2011 Census of India, 95.81% of the population in the district spoke Marathi and 2.69% Hindi as their first language.

== Rainfall ==
The table below shows the details of average rainfall from June–October for the period 1981 to 2011.

Year	Rainfall (mm)	Year	Rainfall (mm)	Year	Rainfall (mm)	Year	Rainfall (mm)
1981	542	1991	391	2001	495	2011	413
1982	552	1992	352	2002	436	2012	
1983	779	1993	651	2003	281	2013	
1984	532	1994	493	2004	565	2014	
1985	456	1995	498	2005	606	2015	
1986	637	1996	514	2006	746	2016	
1987	432	1997	328	2007	401	2017	
1988	689	1998	920	2008	763	2018	
1989	864	1999	405	2009	710	2019	
1990	597	2000	400	2010	729	2020	

== See also ==
- Talukas in Ahmednagar district
- Villages in Karjat taluka
