= Nevasa taluka =

- Tehsil
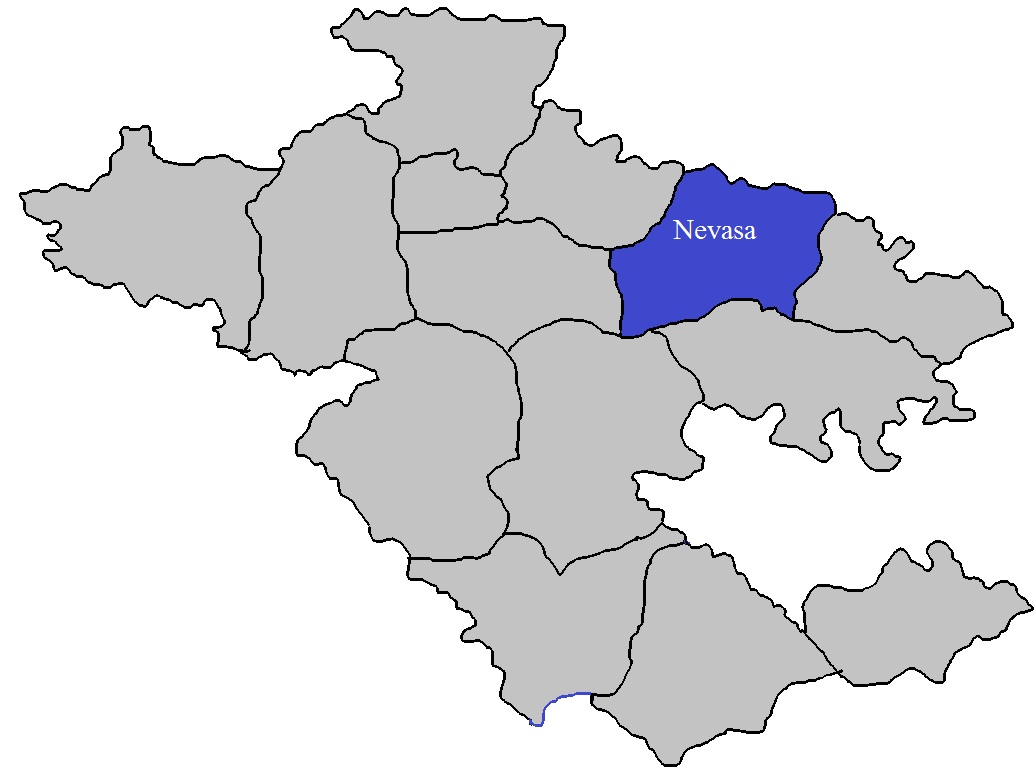
- Location of Nevasa in Ahmednagar district in Maharashtra
- Country: India
- State: Maharashtra
- District: Ahmednagar
- Headquarters: Shrirampur

Government
  - MLA: Balasaheb Murkute

Area
  - Total: 1,343.43 km^{2} (518.70 sq mi)

Population (2011)
  - Total: 357,829
  - Density: 266.355/km^{2} (689.856/sq mi)

Demographics
  - Literacy rate: 63.6
- Website: https://www.newasa.ga

Nevasa taluka (Newasa), is a taluka in Shrirampur subdivision of Ahmednagar district in Maharashtra state of India. Nevasa is a place where Sant Dnyaneshwar wrote the Dnyaneshwari.

Newasa is also well known for its historical sites.

== Area ==
The table below shows area of the taluka by land type.

Type of Land	Area (km^{2})	% of Total Area
Agriculture	1223.91	91.1
Forest	14.75	1.1
Other	104.77	7.8
Total	1343.43	100

== Villages ==
There are around 120 villages in Nevasa taluka. For list of villages see Villages in Nevasa taluka.

== Population ==
Religions in Nevasa taluk (2011)
Religion	Percent
Hinduism	92.41%
Islam	5.88%
Jainism	0.64%
Christianity	0.53%
Other or not stated	0.54%

Nevasa taluka has a population of 357,829 according to the 2011 census. Nevasa had a literacy rate of 78.51% and a sex ratio of 934 females per 1000 males. The entire population lives in rural areas. Scheduled Castes and Scheduled Tribes make up 14.72% and 5.28% of the population respectively.

Languages of Nevasa taluk (2011)
1. Marathi (91.5%)
2. Hindi (3.54%)
3. Urdu (2.07%)
4. Vadari (0.92%)
5. Others (1.92%)

At the time of the 2011 Census of India, 91.55% of the population in the district spoke Marathi, 3.54% Hindi, 2.07% Urdu and 0.92% Vadari as their first language.

== Rainfall ==
The table below offers details of rainfall from 1981 to 2004.

Year	Rainfall (mm)
1981	366
1982	185
1983	701
1984	407
1985	302
1986	375
1987	488
1988	583
1989	593
1990	786
1991	395
1992	380
1993	447
1994	531.3
1995	664
1996	623
1997	312
1998	681
1999	461
2000	516
2001	312
2002	305
2003	219
2004	990

== See also ==
- Talukas in Ahmednagar district
- Villages in Nevasa taluka
