= Shevgaon =

Shevgaon Shivgram
- Taluka
- Location in Maharashtra, India Shevgaon (India)
- Coordinates: 19°21′N 75°14′E
- Country: India
- State: Maharashtra
- District: Ahmednagar

Population (2011)
  - Total: 38,375

Languages
  - Official: Marathi
- Time zone: UTC+5:30 (IST)
- PIN: 414502
- Vehicle registration: MH-16
- Nearest city: Ahmednagar
- Lok Sabha constituency: Ahmednagar
- Vidhan Sabha constituency: Shevgaon-Pathardi
- Climate: Somewhat dry weather; dusty roads (Köppen)

Shevgaon is a city in Shevgaon tehsil of Ahmednagar in the Indian state of Maharashtra

Many villages of this tehsil were submerged by the floodwater of the Jayakwadi Dam in the 1970s. Shevgaon used to be known as Shivgram because there were five Shiva Mandirs around the city.

== Demographics ==
According to the 2011 Indian census, Shevgaon has a population of 38,375, including 19,442 males and 18,993 females. There are 8,013 families, and 12.7% of the village population is children.

Shevgaon village has a slightly higher literacy rate than Maharashtra as a whole, at 82.43% literate.
