= Nevasa =

Nevasa Nidhi Nivas Mahalaya, Newase, Nevase
- town
- Location in Maharashtra, India
- Coordinates: 19°33′05″N 74°55′40″E
- Country: India
- State: Maharashtra
- District: Ahmednagar

Language
  - Official: Marathi
- Time zone: UTC+5:30 (IST)
- PIN: 414603
- Telephone code: 912427
- Vehicle registration: MH-17
- Nearest city: Shrirampur
- Lok Sabha constituency: Shirdi
- Vidhan Sabha constituency: Nevasa
- Climate: hot and humid (Köppen)

Nevasa is a city in Nevasa tehsil of Ahmednagar district in the Indian state of Maharashtra.

== Mohiniraj Temple ==
The city of Nevasa is the location of a 75 - foot tall temple of Mohini, built in 1773, which houses an image of Mohiniraj (Vishnu).

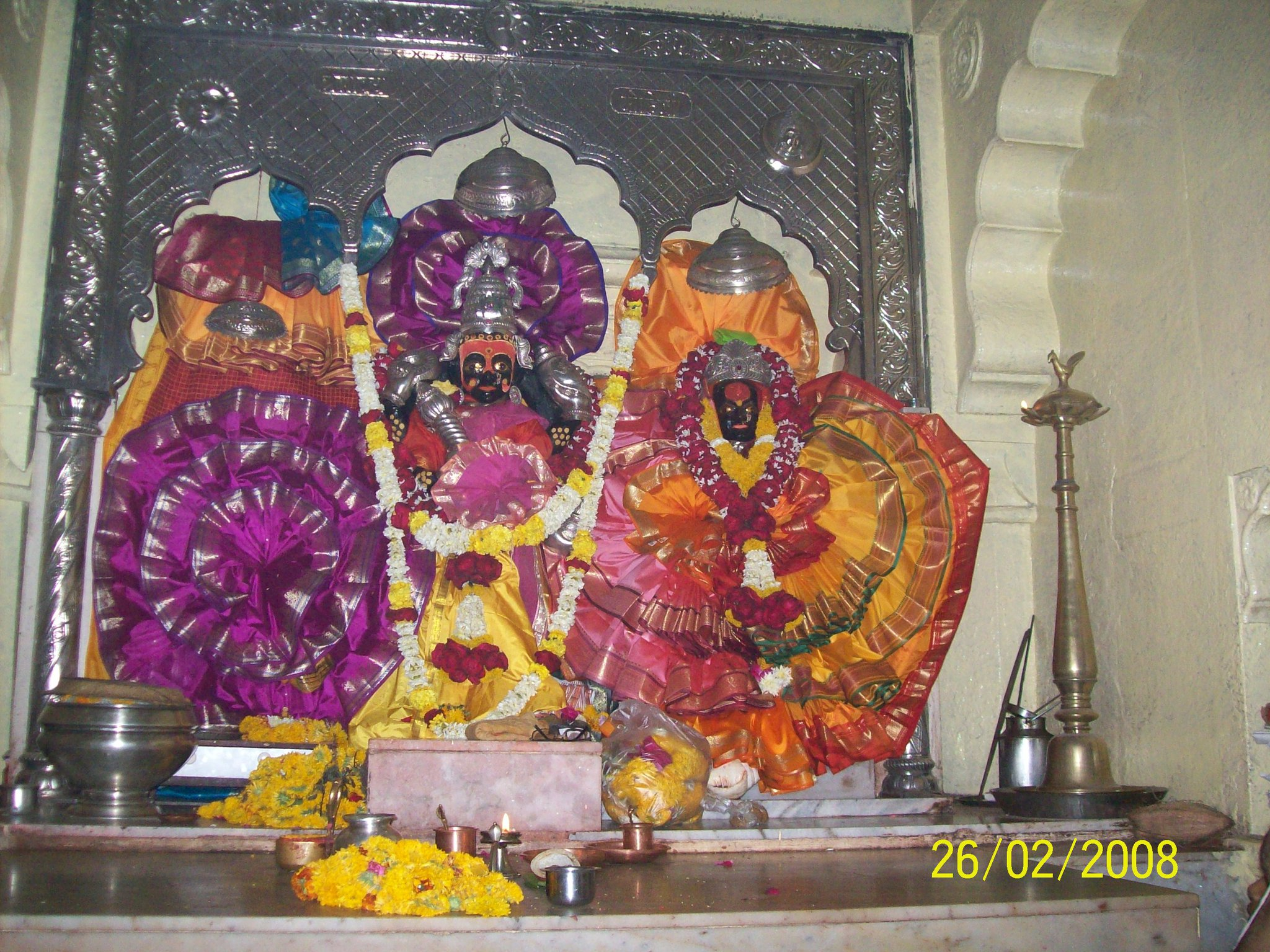
Mohini Raj, Lakshmi

== Other information ==
The remains of a multilevel settlement dating from the Paleolithic period to the Middle Ages have been discovered at Navasa. Excavations were conducted by H. D. Sankalia in the 1950s and by G. Karve-Corvinus in 1967. Nevasa's Aeneolithic layer reveals a settled agricultural culture characterized in the second millennium B.C. by implements (elongated plates) similar to those of the Harappa civilization, in modern-day Pakistan.
