= Taklibhan =

Village in Maharashtra

Coordinates: 19°37′N 74°48′E

Taklibhan is a village located in Ahilyanagar district, Maharashtra state in India. It was previously known as "Raja Bhanachi Takli" meaning Takli of king Bhan. The village is situated between Shrirampur and Nevasa.
