= Kakadwadi =

- village
- Location in Maharashtra, India Kakadwadi (India)
- Coordinates: 19.7116°N 74.2792°E
- Country: India
- State: Maharashtra
- District: सांगली
- Taluka: Miraj

Government
  - Body: Village Panchayat

Languages
  - Official: Marathi
- Time zone: UTC+5:30 ([[Indian Standa rd Time|IST]])
- Lok Sabha constituency: Miraj
- Vidhan Sabha constituency: सांगली

Kakadwadi is a village in Miraj Taluka in Sangli District of Maharashtra State, India. It belongs to Desh or Paschim Maharashtra region, belongs to Pune Division. It is located 14 km towards North from District headquarters Sangli, 13 km from Miraj, 348 km from State capital. Kakadwadi Local language is Marathi.

== Demographic ==
Kakadwadi Village Total population is 961 and number of houses are 184. Female Population is 48.8%. Village literacy rate is 78.6% and the Female Literacy rate is 34.4%.
