= Shrirampur taluka =

- Tehsil
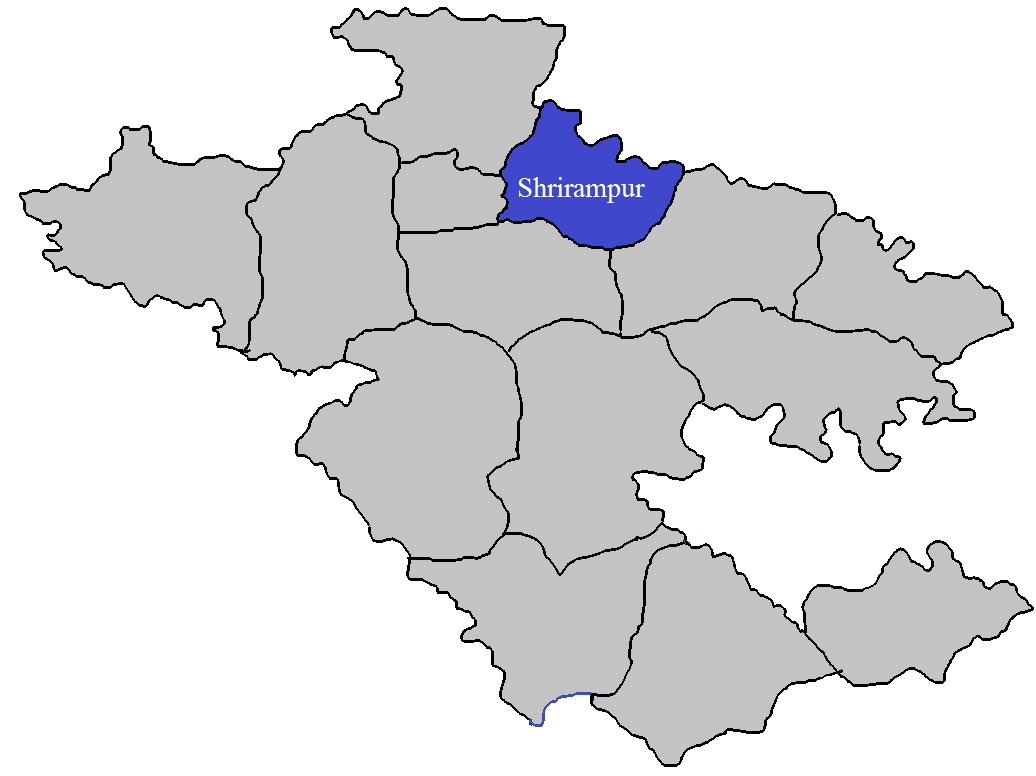
- Location of Shrirampur in Ahmednagar district in Maharashtra
- Country: India
- State: Maharashtra
- District: Ahmednagar
- Headquarters: Shrirampur

Area
  - Total: 569.87 km^{2} (220.03 sq mi)

Population (2011)
  - Total: 287,500
  - Density: 504.5/km^{2} (1,307/sq mi)

Demographics
  - Literacy rate: 68.95%

Shrirampur taluka, is a taluka in Shrirampur subdivision of Ahmednagar district in Maharashtra state of India.

== Area ==
The table below shows area of the taluka by land type.

Type of Land	Area (km^{2})	% of Total Area
Agriculture	507.34	89.03
Forest	0	0
Other	62.53	10.97
Total	569.87	100

== Villages ==
There are around 56 villages in Shrirampur taluka. For a list of villages see Villages in Shrirampur taluka. Belapur is one of the important places and a developed village in the taluka.

== Population ==
Religions in Shrirampur taluk (2011)
Religion	Percent
Hinduism	82.73%
Islam	12.94%
Buddhism	1.29%
Jainism	1.27%
Christianity	0.96%
Sikhism	0.51%
Other or not stated	0.30%

Shrirampur taluka has a population of 287,500 according to the 2011 census. Shrirampur had a literacy rate of 82.12% and a sex ratio of 962 females per 1000 males. 89,282 (31.05%) lived in urban areas. Scheduled Castes and Scheduled Tribes make up 19.29% and 6.80% of the population respectively.

Languages of Shrirampur taluk (2011)
1. Marathi (81.0%)
2. Hindi (6.99%)
3. Urdu (6.44%)
4. Marwari (1.40%)
5. Vadari (0.92%)
6. Others (3.21%)

At the time of the 2011 Census of India, 81.04% of the population in the district spoke Marathi, 6.99% Hindi, 6.44% Urdu, 1.40% Marwari and 0.92% Vadari as their first language.

== Rain Fall ==
The table below details rainfall from 1981 to 2004.

Year	Rainfall (mm)
1981	880
1982	373
1983	668
1984	350
1985	392
1986	335
1987	582
1988	546
1989	585
1990	752
1991	401
1992	456
1993	566
1994	463.9
1995	508
1996	611
1997	312
1998	819
1999	315
2000	354
2001	341
2002	391
2003	313
2004	485

Best places to visit in ukkalgaon==See also==

- Shrirampur
- Talukas in Ahmednagar district
- Villages in Shrirampur taluka
