= Savedi =

Savedi Savedi City
- Sub-Urban City of Ahmednagar
- Interactive map of Savedi
- Country: India
- State: Maharashtra
- District: Ahmednagar

Government
  - Body: Ahmednagar Municipal Corporation

Languages
  - Official: Marathi
- Time zone: UTC+5:30 (IST)
- PIN: 414003
- Telephone code: +91 241
- Vehicle registration: MH 16
- Nearest city: Ahmednagar
- Lok Sabha constituency: Ahmednagar
- Vidhan Sabha constituency: Ahmednagar City
- Civic agency: Ahmednagar Municipal Corporation
- Website: amc.gov.in

Savedi is a suburb in the northern part of Ahmednagar in the Indian state of Maharashtra. The All India Radio centre and the TV Centre of Prasar Bharati are located in this area.

== Geography ==
Savedi is located in Nagar-Manmad Road (State Highway 10) and Nagar-Aurangabad Road. The Aurangabad Road and Manmad Road pass through this area of the city.

== Population ==
The population numbers some 100,000.

== Culture ==
=== Temples ===
- Ayyappa Temple, Vaidu Wadi
- Dattatreya Temple, Premdan Chowk
- Shiv Mandir, Lekhanagar Road
- Datt Mandir, Lekhnagar

=== Cultural halls ===
- Raosaheb Patwardhan Smarak
- Shri. Swami samarth temple, Vrundawan colony, Rasane nagar.
- Durga Mata temple, Onkar colony, Rasane Nagar.

=== NGOs ===
- Apang sanjeevni societie's mukbadhir vidalaya

=== Marathi medium schools ===
- M.E.S. Renavikar Vidya Mandir
- Shri Samarth Vidya Mandir, Bhistbaug Road.
- Jai Bajrang Vidyalaya, Gulmohur Road.
- Anand Vidyalaya, Gulmohur Road.

=== English medium schools ===
- Swami Vivekanand School, Tarakpur
- St. Xavier's, Tarakpur
- Athare Patil Public Hospital
- Sree Sai English School
- Swami Vivekanand High School
- Indus World School
- Kidzee Preschool

=== Colleges ===
- Pemraj Sarda College
- Ahmednagar Homoeopathic Medical College, Manmad Road
- Shri Samarth Vidya Mandir (Junior College)
- Jai Bajrang Vidyalaya
- New Art & Science College

== Health ==
Hospitals include:

- Noble Hospital, Premdan Chowk
- Oberoi Hospital, Zopadi Canteen
- Surabhi Hospital, Gulmohar Road
- Mac Care Hospital, Ekveera Chwak
- Neoron Plus Hospital
- Medplus Hospital
- Athare Patil Hospital
- Daule Hospital
- Ruby Hall Hospital

== Entertainment ==
Savedi hosts cultural festivals including Ganapati Festival, Navaratri, Lord Balaji Festival, and lighting festivals at Datta Temple and Ayyappa Temple.

Ahmednagar Karandak is an annual stage competition.

Ahmednagar Film Festival is a newes film festival.

== Transport ==
It can be reached by bus. Ahmednagar Mahanagarpalika Transport (AMT) Bus Are Available.
