= Waddar language =

Telugu dialect spoken in South Asia

Waddar
- Native to: India, Nepal
- Region: Andhra Pradesh, Karnataka, Maharashtra
- Ethnicity: Waddar
- Native speakers: 200,000 (2011 census)
- Language family: Dravidian: Southern; Southern II; Teluguoid; Waddar
- Writing system: Telugu, Kannada, Devanagari

Language codes
- ISO 639-3: wbq
- Glottolog: wadd1237

Waddar, or Vadari (IPA: [ʋɐɖːɐr(i)]), is a Dravidian language which belongs to the Telugu branch of its South-Central family, spoken among social caste of Waddars scattered over South India, and Sri Lanka especially in Karnataka, where it has a status of Scheduled caste. 200,000 people reported their languages as 'Vadari' in the 2011 census. Ethnologue treats it as separate Dravidian language closely related to Telugu, but without clear grounds. Waddars show their close relevance to Kaikadis.

== Sources ==
- Zvelebil, Kamil (1990), Dravidian Linguistics: An Introduction, Pondicherry Institute of Linguistics and Culture, ISBN 978-81-8545-201-2
- Chandrashekhar Bhat. Ethnicity and Mobility: Emerging Ethnic Identity and Social Mobility Among the Waddars of South India. Concept Publishing Company, 1984.
