= List of talukas in Ahmednagar District =

Ahmednagar district is a district in state of Maharashtra in India. There are 14 talukas (talukas) in Ahmednagar.

== District Subdivisions ==
Ahmednagar district is divided into four district subdivisions.

Ahmednagar

- Nagar
- Parner
- Pathardi
- Shevgaon

Karjat

- Jamkhed
- Karjat
- Shrigonda

Sangamner

- Akole
- Kopargaon
- Sangamner

Shrirampur

- Nevasa
- Rahata
- Rahuri
- Shrirampur

== List of talukas in Ahmednagar district by area ==
The Table below list all 14 talukas of Ahmednagar district in the Indian state of Maharashtra along with district subdivision, area, largest city and location map in the district information.

Name of taluka	District Subdivision	Area (km^{2})	% of District Area	Largest City	Location on District Map
Akole	Sangamner	1505.08	8.64%	Akole	
Jamkhed	Karjat	878.62	5.05%	Jamkhed	
Karjat	Karjat	1503.61	8.64%	Karjat	
Kopargaon	Sangamner	725.16	4.16%	Kopargaon	
Nagar	Ahmednagar	1605.74	9.22%	Ahmednagar	
Nevasa	Shrirampur	1343.43	7.72%	Nevasa	
Parner	Ahmednagar	1930.28	11.09%	Parner	
Pathardi	Ahmednagar	1214.10	6.97%	Pathardi	
Rahata	Shrirampur	759.19	4.36%	Rahata	
Rahuri	Shrirampur	1035.11	5.94%	Rahuri	
Sangamner	Sangamner	1705.06	9.79%	Sangamner	
Shevgaon	Ahmednagar	1031.85	5.93%	Shevgaon	
Shrigonda	Karjat	1605.61	9.22%	Shrigonda	
Shrirampur	Shrirampur	569.87	3.27%	Shrirampur	

== List of talukas in Ahmednagar district by population ==
The table below lists important geographic and demographic parameters for all 14 talukas of Ahmednagar district. Population data is extracted from the 2001 Census of India.

taluka Name	Population (2001 census)	% of District Population	Male	Male(%)	Female	Female(%)	Sex Ratio	Literacy	Literacy(%)	Literate Male	Literate Male(%)	Literate Female	Literate Female(%)
Akole	271719	6.65	137617	50.65	134102	49.35	974	160734	59.15	95179	69.16	65555	48.88
Jamkhed	134238	3.28	68837	51.28	65401	48.72	950	58868	43.85	36270	52.69	22598	34.55
Karjat	205585	5.03	106347	51.73	99238	48.27	906	190227	92.53	109470	102.94	80757	81.38
Kopargaon	276937	6.77	143502	51.82	133435	48.18	930	177516	64.1	104488	72.81	73028	54.73
Nagar	651569	15.94	341864	52.47	309705	47.53	906	483736	74.24	274906	80.41	208830	67.43
Nevasa	326611	7.99	168561	51.61	158050	48.39	938	207717	63.6	122225	72.51	85492	54.09
Parner	246535	6.03	123902	50.26	122633	49.74	990	153625	62.31	89698	72.39	63927	52.13
Pathardi	214819	5.25	110075	51.24	104744	48.76	936	130993	60.98	78886	71.67	52107	49.75
Rahata	288003	7.04	148642	51.61	139361	48.39	938	196296	68.16	112294	75.55	84002	60.28
Rahuri	294748	7.21	152275	51.66	142473	48.34	936	193498	65.65	112350	73.78	81148	56.96
Sangamner	439806	10.76	226022	51.39	213784	48.61	946	286779	65.21	167277	74.01	119502	55.9
Shevgaon	203747	4.98	104342	51.21	99405	48.79	953	173398	85.1	99460	95.32	73938	74.38
Shrigonda	277319	6.78	143015	51.57	134304	48.43	939	176826	63.76	103101	72.09	73725	54.89
Shrirampur	256441	6.27	131500	51.28	124941	48.72	939	176826	68.95	103101	78.4	73725	59.01

== List of talukas in Ahmednagar district by rain fall ==
The Table below list all 14 talukas of Ahmednagar district in the Indian state of Maharashtra by average rain fall along with each year rainfall information from 1981 to 2004.

taluka	Average	1981	1982	1983	1984	1985	1986	1987	1988	1989	1990	1991	1992	1993	1994	1995	1996	1997	1998	1999	2000	2001	2002	2003	2004
Akole	508.9	404	396	445	374	184	244	296	734	444	503	544	404.5	636.3	509.8	374	620	587	814.5	403	439	473	445	489	1074
Jamkhed	583.3	527	555	1341	727	540	872	996	1040	920	523	480	603.2	823	583.3	570	922	427	1070	409	661	333	561	460	570
Karjat	493	542	552	779	532	456	637	432	689	864	597	391	352	651	493	498	514	328	920	405	400	495	436	281	565
Kopargaon	440.2	420	389	531	518	300	319	460	575	594	499	296	418	408	440.2	321	537	290	582	384	428	360	366	280	428
Nagar	531.1	639	520	786	497	400	498	827	772	914	1446	950	572	655	531.1	372	710	347	730	479	580	380	394	199	518
Nevasa	531.3	366	185	701	407	302	375	488	583	593	786	395	380	447	531.3	664	623	312	681	461	516	312	305	219	508
Parner	486.9	622	869	540	575	714	313	472	738	713	630	442	551	696	486.9	259	656	361	702	245	456	384	438	190	695
Pathardi	580.4	483	346	927.2	351	824	318	714	807	701	716	485	434.5	720	571.6	533	932	448	1095	360	471	332	502	476	595
Rahata	441.0	NA	NA	NA	NA	NA	NA	NA	NA	NA	NA	NA	NA	NA	NA	NA	NA	NA	NA	NA	525	413	385	249	490
Rahuri	455	639	434	665	427	301	242	533	725	524	788	466	407	548	455	642	555	345	585	581	587	358	302	299	509
Sangamner	416.6	459	315	363	204	204	260	306	461	558	445	450	342	435	416.6	290	566	402	489	348	528	337	459	380	570
Shevgaon	584.6	314	407	563	309	247	422	596	824	730	697	391	369	519	584.6	363	782	226	780	366	531	349	449	320	715
Shrigonda	448.6	614	438	521.6	496	359	460	497	531	610	614	438	521.6	496	359	460	497	531	610	571	392	352	334	87	527
Shrirampur	464	880	373	668	350	392	335	582	546	585	752	401	456	566	463.9	508	611	312	819	315	354	341	391	313	485

== See also ==
- Ahmednagar district
- talukas in Pune district
