= Ahmednagar district =

Coordinates: 19°05′53″N 74°43′57″E

- District
- Ahilyanagar district
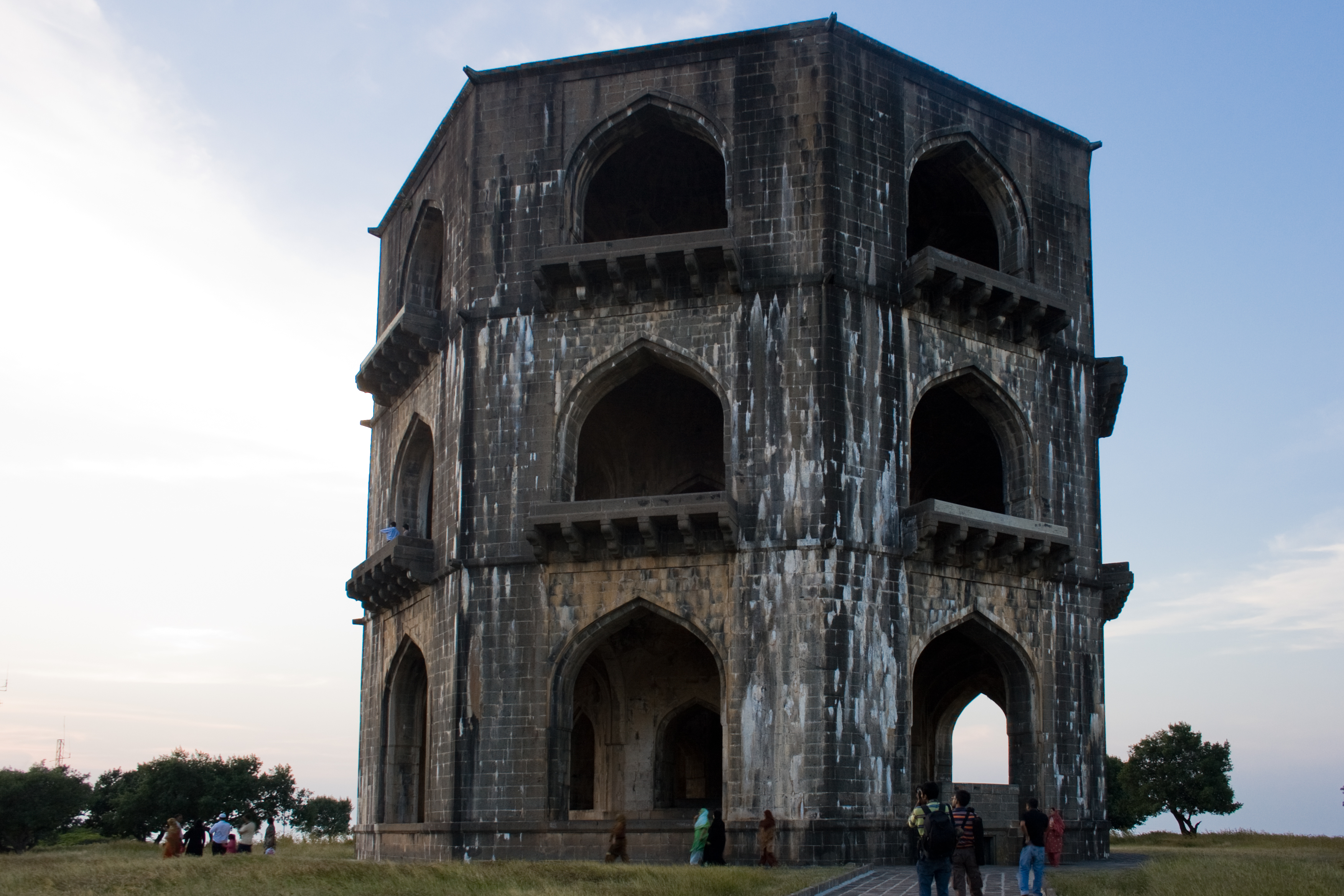
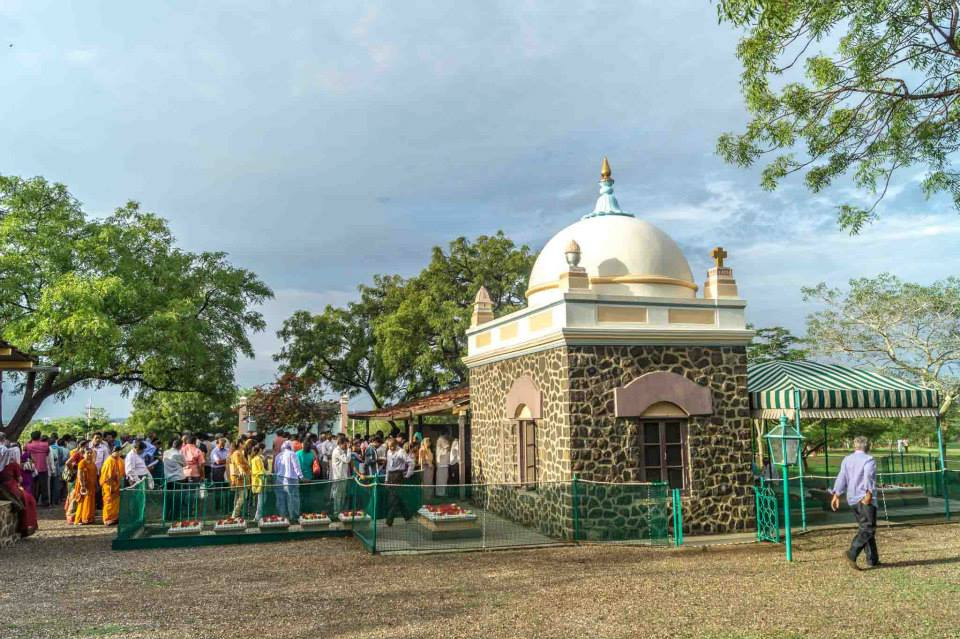
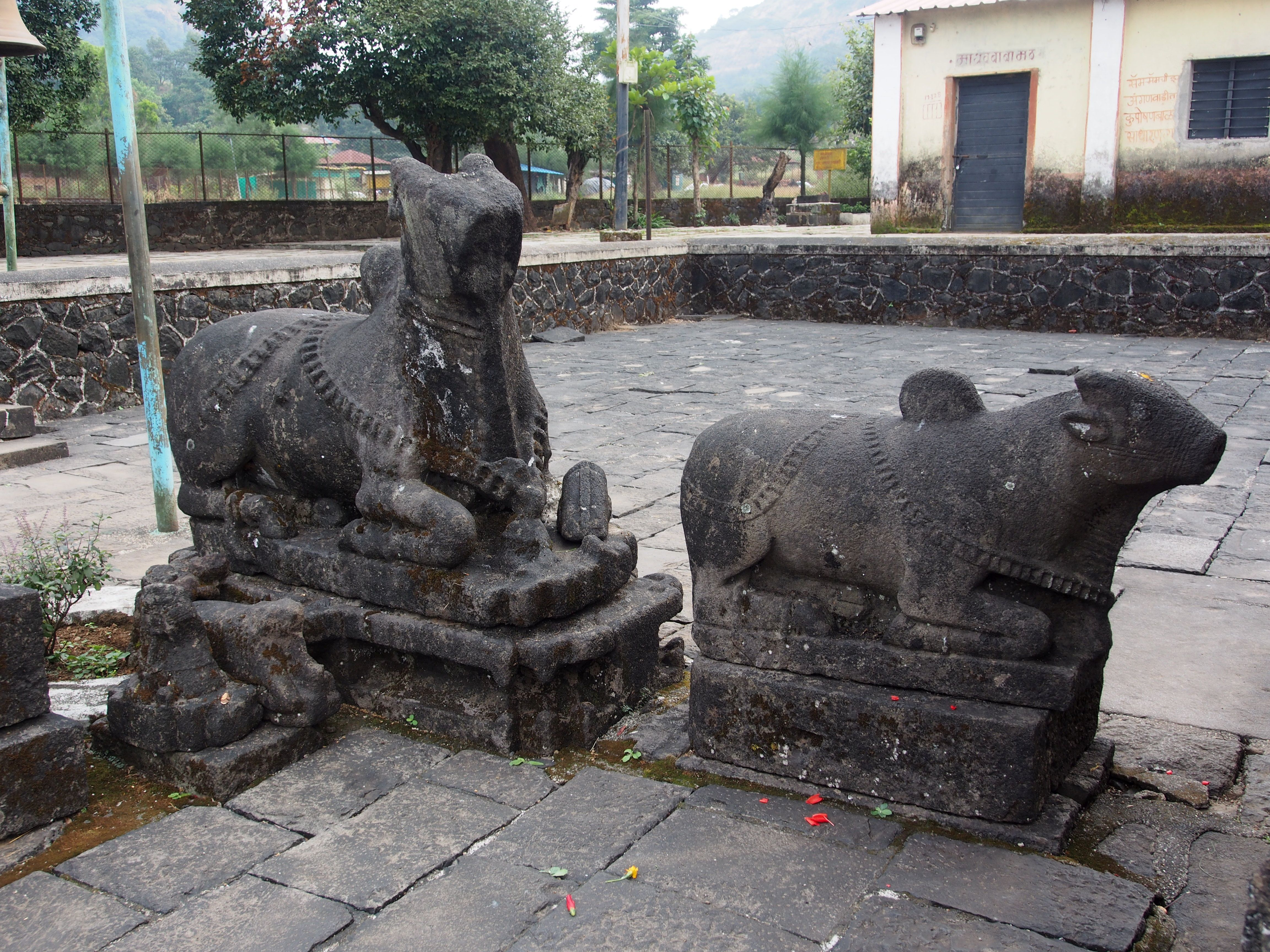
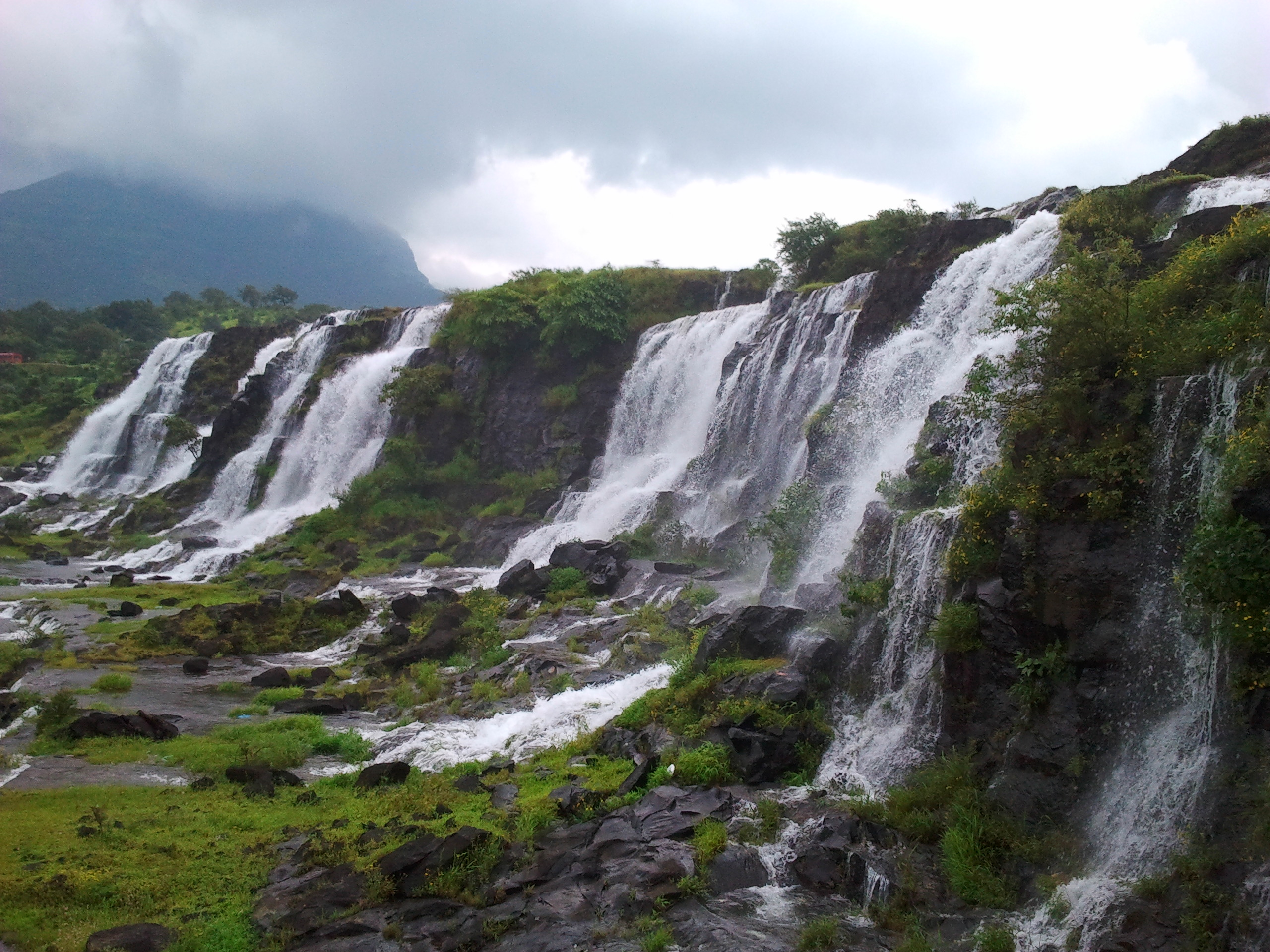
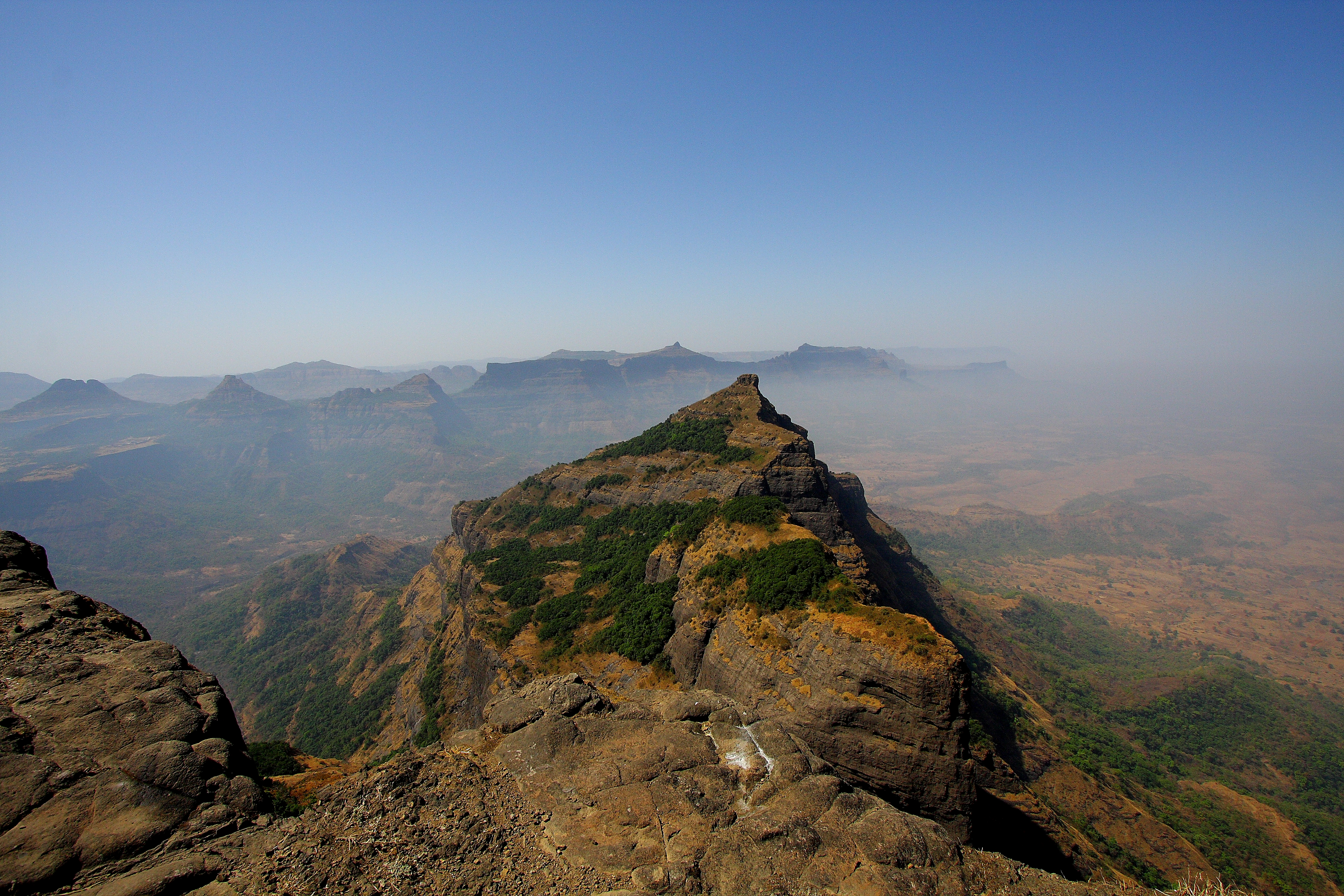
- Clockwise from top-left: Tomb of Salabat Khan II, tomb of Meher Baba, Arthur Lake at Bhandardara, Kalabhairav Pinnacle at Harishchandragad, Amruteshwar Temple at Ratangad

- Location in Maharashtra
- Country: India
- State: Maharashtra
- Division: Nashik
- Headquarters: Ahmednagar
- Tehsils: Akole, Jamkhed, Karjat, Kopargaon, Nagar, Nevasa, Parner, Pathardi, Rahata, Rahuri, Sangamner, Shevgaon, Shrigonda, Shrirampur

Government
  - Body: Ahmednagar Zilla Parishad
  - Guardian Minister: Radhakrishna Vikhe Patil (Cabinet Minister Mah)
  - President Zilla Parishad: President Vacant; Vice-President Vacant
  - District Collector: Siddharam Salimath (IAS)
  - CEO Zilla Parishad: Ashish Yerekar (IAS)
  - MPs: Nilesh Dnyandev Lanke (Ahmednagar); Bhausaheb Rajaram Wakchaure (Shirdi)

Area
  - Total: 17,048 km^{2} (6,582 sq mi)

Population (2011)
  - Total: 4,543,159
  - Density: 266.49/km^{2} (690.21/sq mi)
  - Urban: 17.67%

Demographics
  - Literacy: 80.22%
  - Sex ratio: 934
- Time zone: UTC+05:30 (IST)
- Vehicle registration: MH-16 MH-17 and MH-51
- Major highways: NH-50, NH-222 SH-10
- Average annual precipitation: 501 mm
- Website: ahmednagar.nic.in

Ahmednagar district (Marathi pronunciation: [əɦ(ə)məd̪nəɡəɾ]), officially Ahilyanagar district, is the largest district of Maharashtra state in western India. The historical city of Ahmednagar is the headquarters of the district. Ahmednagar and Sangamner are the largest cities in the district. It was the seat of the Ahmednagar Sultanate of late medieval period (1496–1636 CE). This district is known for the towns of Shirdi associated with Sai Baba, Meherabad associated with Meher Baba, Shani Shinganapur with Shanidev, and Devgad with Lord Dattatreya. Ahmednagar district is part of Nashik Division. The district is bordered by Aurangabad district to the northeast, Nashik district to the northwest, Thane and Pune districts to the southwest, Solapur district to the south and Beed district to the southeast.

== History ==
Although Ahmednagar district was created as early as 1818, modern history of Ahmednagar may be said to have commenced from 1869, the year when parts of Nashik and Solapur, which till then had comprised Nagar, were separated and the present Nagar district was formed. Ahmednagar District was created after the defeat of the Maratha Empire in the Third Anglo-Maratha War in 1818, when most of the Peshwa's domains were annexed to British India. The district remained part of the Central division of Bombay Presidency until India's independence in 1947, when it became part of Bombay State, and in 1960 the new state of Maharashtra.

== Economy ==
In 2006 the Ministry of Panchayati Raj named Ahmednagar one of the country's 250 most backward districts (out of a total of 640). It is one of the twelve districts in Maharashtra currently receiving funds from the Backward Regions Grant Fund Programme (BRGF).

The district has the maximum number of sugar factories in the state. The first cooperative sugar factory in Asia was established at Pravanagar. A role model of water conservation work can be seen at Ralegaon Siddhi, which is also called the Ideal Village.

=== Tourism ===
Newase where Dnyaneshwari was written, Shri Saibaba's Shirdi, one of Ashtavinayaks at Siddhatek, the famous Kanifnath temple, attract devotees. The Palace of Chand Bibi, the Bhandardara dam, Harishchandragad Fort, the Maldhok (Indian Bustard) sanctuary and the Rehkuri sanctuary are some of the places of tourist attraction.

- Ahmednagar Fort
- Bhandardara
- Harishchandragad
- Kalsubai
- Nighoj
- Shani Shingnapur
- Shirdi
- Siddhatek
- Devgad – Shree Datt Mandir
- Newasa – Pais Khamb Mandir

== Divisions ==
Ahmednagar district consists of fourteen talukas. These talukas are

- Akole
- Jamkhed
- Karjat
- Kopargaon
- Nagar
- Nevasa
- Parner
- Pathardi
- Rahata
- Rahuri
- Sangamner
- Shevgaon
- Shrigonda
- Shrirampur.

Ahmednagar district has twelve Vidhan Sabha constituencies, six in each of the two parliamentary constituencies.

For the Shirdi Parliamentary Constituency (SC)

- #216 Akole (ST)
- #217 Sangamner
- #218 Shirdi
- #219 Kopergaon
- #220 Shrirampur (SC)
- #221 Newasa.

For the Ahmednagar Parliamentary Constituency

- #222 Shevgaon
- #223 Rahuri
- #224 Parner
- #225 Ahmednagar City
- #226 Shrigonda
- #227 Karjat-Jamkhed.

The Ahmednagar district is under proposal to be divided and a separate Sangamner district and it can be carved out of existing Ahmednagar district with the inclusion of the northern parts of Ahmednagar district which include Rahata, Rahuri, Shrirampur, Sangamner, Akole, Kopargaon, and Nevasa talukas in the proposed district. Sangamner is geographically at centre for ease of administration and well connected by Roads. Sangamner having its separate Vana Vibhag, Bandhakam Vibhag Office, District Court etc.

Ralegaon Siddhi is a village in the district that is considered a model of environmental conservation.

== Demographics ==
Historical population
Year	Pop.	±% p.a.
1901	821,946	—
1911	927,795	+1.22%
1921	720,709	−2.49%
1931	971,296	+3.03%
1941	1,125,402	+1.48%
1951	1,413,446	+2.31%
1961	1,779,246	+2.33%
1971	2,273,223	+2.48%
1981	2,712,491	+1.78%
1991	3,372,935	+2.20%
2001	4,040,642	+1.82%
2011	4,543,159	+1.18%

In the 2011 census Ahmednagar district recorded a population of 4,543,159, roughly equal to the nation of Costa Rica or the US state of Louisiana. This gave it a ranking of 33rd among the districts of India (out of a total of 640). The district had a population density of 266 inhabitants per square kilometre (690/sq mi). Its population growth rate over the decade 2001–2011 was 12.43%. Ahmadnagar had a sex ratio of 934 females for every 1000 males, and a literacy rate of 80.22%. 20.09% of the population lives in urban areas. Scheduled Castes and Scheduled Tribes made up 12.63% and 8.63% of the population respectively.

Religions in Ahmednagar district (2011)
Religion	Percent
Hinduism	90.40%
Islam	7.06%
Jainism	0.85%
Buddhism	0.75%
Christianity	0.50%
Other or not stated	0.54%

In the 2011 census, the vast majority of the population in Ahmednagar was Hindu, but there was a significant population of Muslims. Jains and Buddhists are small minorities.

Languages of Ahmednagar district (2011)
1. Marathi (88.9%)
2. Hindi (4.74%)
3. Urdu (2.74%)
4. Others (3.63%)

At the time of the 2011 Census of India, 88.89% of the population in the district spoke Marathi, 4.74% Hindi and 2.74% Urdu as their first language. Other languages include Telugu and its dialect Waddar, as well as Marwari.

== Culture ==
Islam arrived in Ahmednagar during the Tughlaq dynasty. There are many Muslim monuments like salabat khan's Tomb known as chandbibi, Faria Baug, Ground Fort and many dargas (mosques), and they are found in main town and cities.

During the British era Ahmednagar was part of Bombay presidency. Christian missionaries, particularly from the United States of America, arrived in early 19th century when the British parliament allowed proselytising in areas under the control of the East India Company. In Ahmednagar Christians are a result of the American Marathi mission and the mission of the Church of England's Society for the Propagation of the Gospel.The first Protestant Christian mission in the district was opened in 1831.The Hume Memorial Congregational Church in Ahmednagar city was built in 1833 by WIDER CHURCH MINISTRIES OF USA later known as American Marathi Mission. Christianity has been Ahmednagar's third-largest religion, found all over the district except in the south-west. It is called as Jerusalem of Maharashtra. Every village has one or more resident families as Christian and every village has its own church for worship. Ahmednagar's Christians are called Marathi Christians and a majority of them are Protestants.

== Renaming as Ahilyanagar ==
At a public meeting at Choundi on 31 May 2023, the then deputy chief minister Devendra Fadnavis made a speech asking that both Ahmednagar and Ahmednagar district be renamed Ahilyanagar in honour of Ahilyabai Holkar, the Rani of Indore. Later at the same meeting, the then chief minister Eknath Shinde, seconded the proposal. The state cabinet approved the change of name on 13 March 2024. Other politicians criticised the move; Rais Shaikh said: "The Maha Yuti government is implementing the 'Yogi pattern' of creating an illusion of development by changing the names of cities without doing anything for development".

== Officer ==
=== Members of Parliament ===
- Nilesh Dnyandev Lanke (NCP(SP)) – Ahmednagar
- Bhausaheb Rajaram Wakchaure (SHS(UBT)) Shirdi

=== Guardian Minister ===
Guardian Minister Ahmednagar
- Emblem of India
- Incumbent; Radhakrishna Vikhe Patil since 27 September 2022
- Style: The Honourable
- Appointer: Chief Minister of Maharashtra
- Term length: 5 years / No time limit
- Website: ahilyanagar.maharashtra.gov.in/en/

==== list of Guardian Minister ====
Name	Term of office
Hasan Mushrif	9 January 2020 – 14 August 2022
Radhakrishna Vikhe Patil	27 September 2020 – Incumbent

=== District Magistrate/Collector ===
District Magistrate / Collector Ahmednagar
- Emblem of India
- Incumbent; Pankaj Ashiya (IAS) since March 2025
- Appointer: Government of Maharashtra
- Term length: No time limit
- Website: ahilyanagar.maharashtra.gov.in/en/

==== list of District Magistrate / Collector ====
Name	Term of office
Siddharm Salimath	15 February 2023 – 3 March 2025
Pankaj Ashiya	7 March 2025 - Incumbent

== Notable people ==
- Meher Baba – spiritualist, has Ashram's in Meherabad & Meherazad, Ahmednagar
- Balasaheb Bharde (1912–2006) – former Minister, former speaker of the State Legislative Assembly and Padma Bhushan recipient.
- Changdev - Saint from 13th century. His samadi is at Puntamba
- Gaur Gopal Das – Indian guru, motivational speaker and a well-known monk of ISKCON organisation, was born in Vambori village.
- Anna Hazare – social activist
- Zaheer Khan – Indian cricketer (born 1978), a key member of the Indian cricket team since 2000. He also played County Cricket for Worcestershire and plays for Mumbai in Indian domestic cricket.
- B. J. Khatal-Patil – Ex. Cabinet Minister of Maharashtra, a senior Maharashtra leader and a veteran Congressman.
- Indurikar Maharaj – comedian kirtankar, and social educator
- Balasaheb Vikhe Patil – member of parliament and a former minister, Padma Bhushan recipient
- Vithalrao Vikhe Patil – Indian industrialist, the founder of the first cooperative sugar factory at Loni, and a group of industries and institutions, Awarded the Padma Shri in 1961.
- Dagdu Maruti Pawar (1935–1996) – Marathi author and poet known for his contributions to Dalit literature. He was born in Dhamangaon, Akole taluka.
- Ajinkya Rahane – Indian cricketer born at Ashvi village, Sangmner on 6 June 1988.
- C. Ramchandra – music director and playback singer.
- Saibaba of Shirdi -Revered saint from the late 19th - early 20th century
- Balasaheb Thorat (1924–2010) – a farmers leader and Indian National Congress legislator. Founder of the Sangamner Cooperative Sugar Mill, and former president of the Sangamner taluka and State Cooperative Bank.

== Villages ==
- Dadh budruk
- Vambori
- Wadgaon Gupta
