= Nawalewadi =

Village in Maharashtra

- Village
- Location in Maharashtra, India Nawalewadi (India)
- Coordinates: 19°32′08″N 73°59′30″E
- Country: India
- State: Maharashtra
- District: Ahmednagar

Population (2011)
  - Total: 2,925

Languages
  - Official: Marathi
- Time zone: UTC+5:30 (IST)
- PIN: 422601
- Telephone code: 02424
- Vehicle registration: MH-17
- Nearest city: Akole
- Lok Sabha constituency: Shirdi
- Vidhan Sabha constituency: Akole
- Website: www.nawalewadi.com

Nawalewadi is a village in Ahmednagar district, Maharashtra, India.
