= Bhausaheb =

Bhausaheb is a given name. Notable people with the name include:

- Bhausaheb Bandodkar, the first Chief Minister of Goa, Daman and Diu
- Bhausaheb Babasaheb Nimbalkar (1919–2012), Indian cricketer
- Bhausaheb Phundkar, leader of opposition in Maharashtra Legislative Council in India
- Bhausaheb Ubale, (born 1936 in Bawchi, India), a Canadian human rights activist
- Shri Bhausaheb Maharaj Umdikar, Indian guru, initiated the Inchegeri Sampraday
- Bhausaheb Rajaram Wakchaure, member of the 15th Lok Sabha of India

== See also ==
- Late Bhausaheb Hiray Smaranik Samiti Trust, Indian college
- Shri Bhausaheb Hire Government Medical College, Dhule, Medical Institution located in Dhule, Maharashtra
