= Bhandardara =

- Village
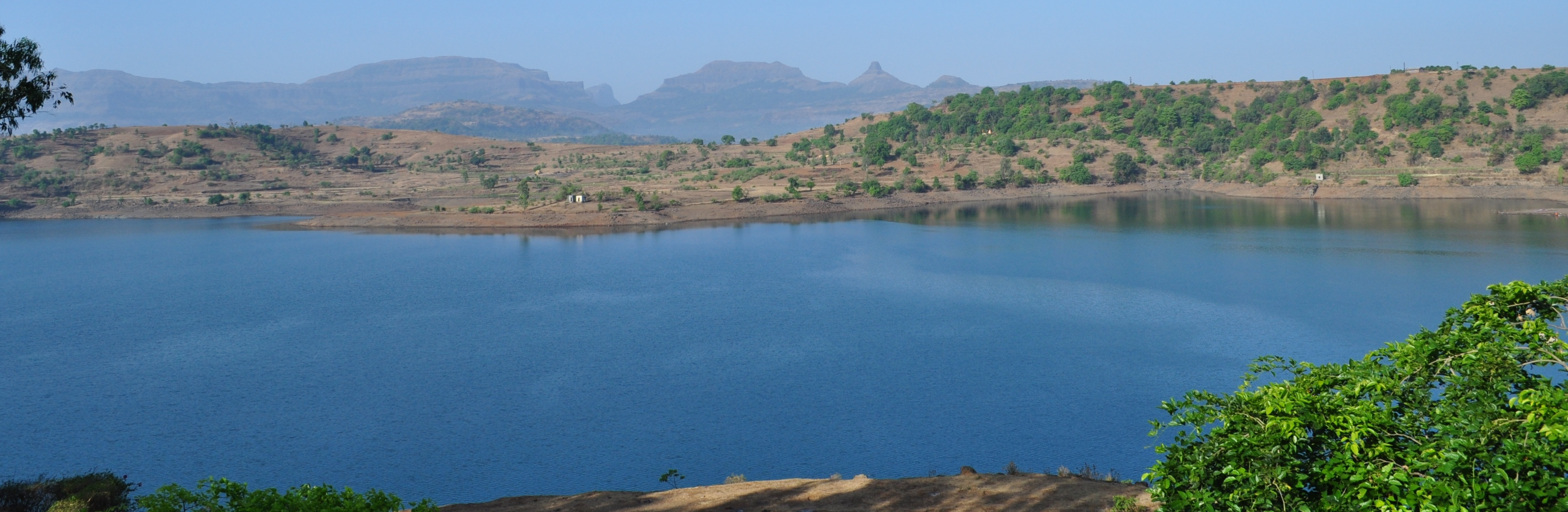
- Arthur Lake

- Location in Maharashtra, India
- Coordinates: 19°31′45″N 73°45′5″E
- Country: India
- State: Maharashtra
- District: Aahilyanagar

Government
  - Body: Government of Maharashtra
- Elevation: 740 m (2,430 ft)

Language
  - Official: Marathi
- Time zone: UTC+5:30 (IST)
- Telephone code: 02424
- Vehicle registration: MH-17
- Nearest city: Nashik Sangamner
- Lok Sabha constituency: Shirdi
- Vidhan Sabha constituency: Akole

Bhandardara is a holiday resort village on the Pravara River near Igatpuri, in the Western Ghats of India. The village is located in the Akole tehsil, Aahilyanagar district of the state of Maharashtra, about 185 kilometers (115 mi) from Mumbai, and 73 kilometers (45 mi) from Nashik.

Bhandardara attractions include Wilson Dam and Arthur Lake.

The Ratangad and Harishchandragad forts are above the town. The highest peak in Maharashtra, Mount Kalsubai, is 1646 m.
