= Vithe =

Village in Maharashtra

- Village
- Location in Maharashtra, India
- Coordinates: 19°31′16″N 73°54′54″E
- Country: India
- State: Maharashtra
- District: Ahmednagar

Language
  - Official: Marathi
- Time zone: UTC+5:30 (IST)
- Telephone code: 02424
- Vehicle registration: MH-17
- Nearest city: Nashik
- Lok Sabha constituency: Shirdi
- Vidhan Sabha constituency: akole

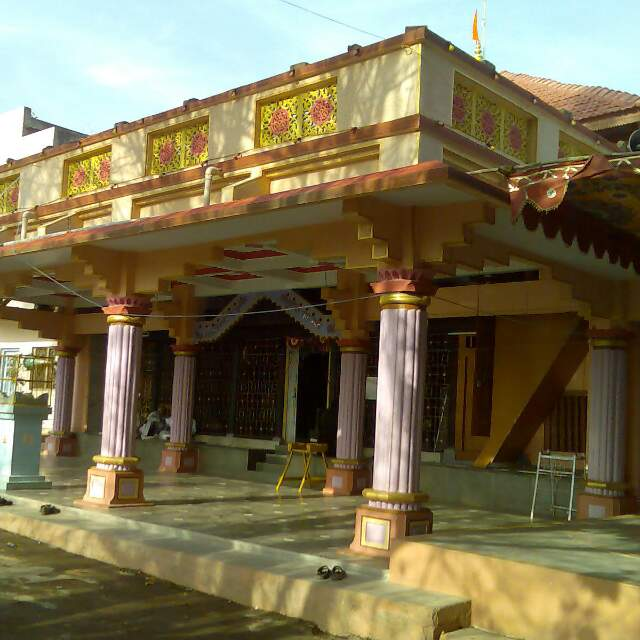
Vitthal Tempal, Vithe

Vithe is a village in Akole tehsil of Ahmednagar district in Maharashtra state of India. on the Pravara River.
