= Indurikar Maharaj =

Social educator from Maharashtra, India

- Born: Nivrutti Kashinath Deshmukh; 9 January 1972 (age 54); Indori, Akole taluka, Ahmednagar district, Maharashtra
- Education: Gokhale Education Society's College of Education
- Occupations: Kirtankar; social educator; teacher (formerly)
- Years active: 1994–present
- Known for: Kirtans (In Marathi)
- Spouse: Shalinitai Deshmukh
- Children: 2

Nivrutti Kashinath Deshmukh (born 9 January 1972) commonly known as Indurikar Maharaj, is an Indian kirtankar and social educator from Maharashtra, India. His shows typically involve humorous routines that poke fun at societal ills and malpractices.

== Early life and education ==
Indurikar was born on 9 January 1972 to a Kshatriya Maratha kirtankar family. He grew up in Indori village in Akole taluka of Ahmednagar district and adopted the demonym Indorikar/Indurikar as part of his stage name. Indurikar earned a B.Ed. degree from the Gokhale Education Society's College of Education in Sangamner, Ahmednagar district. He initially worked as a teacher and started performing Kirtans at the age of 22.

== Kirtan style ==
Indurikar is known for interlacing humorous relatable examples in his kirtans and thus is able to quickly strike a cord with the audience. First cassette of his kirtan was released in 2003 and soon became famous over the social media. Indurikar, along with a group of associates, employ musical instruments Taal and Mridang, but their usage is minimal.

According to Sadanand More, a historian as well as a kirtan writer, Indurikar does not fit within the hierarchy of Sant Parampara and Warkari sampradaya. He added that Indurikar's objectification of women and substandard jokes are indicative of base-level mediocrity.

He has been accused of promoting superstition.

== Controversies ==
Teachers unions in Maharashtra expressed displeasure at swipes taken by Indurikar accusing teachers of being lazy.

Indurikar has made several controversial statements about woman. Some examples of these statements are:

- "The wife of a man who does love marriage calls her husband by name. What a great shortcoming this is. We are men, men. Husband is husband. If my wife calls me single, why won't she gnash her teeth?"
- "No matter how heavy the sandals are, what do you wear around your neck? Where are the sandals? She is a wife. She must be of that size."
- "The less clothes there are on the body of the child, the more the child should be beaten."
- "Tell the maid's wives, what do you do? Shame on you."
- "Pori started dancing in front of Navradeva. At the wedding, check the family, who are yours?"
- "Parents, check your daughters' hands. See if there is a bangle. Or a drowned religion?"
- "Poryalabi was not left alone. She started falling in love with someone. We were in the same class and they said they fell in love. Kanphad (face) should be broken."

=== February 2020 case ===
In February 2020, Indurikar received strong backlash for one of his statements that his made during his sermon in Ozar (budruk) in Ahmednagar. The preacher had reportedly said that "If a woman has intercourse on the even date, a boy is born. If a woman is on an odd date, a girl is born .... If intercourse is done at an inauspicious time, the child that is born would bring a bad name to the family. If the timing (of intercourse) is missed, the quality of output (child) will be sub-standard."

An Anti-superstition NGO Maharashtra Andhashraddha Nirmoolan Samiti sought to file case against Indurikar claiming his remarks on timing of intercourse and gender of child violated the Pre-Conception and Pre-Natal Diagnostic Techniques (PCPNDT) Act as well as the anti Black-Magic Act. His kirtan in Kolhapur was abruptly cancelled. Women's rights activist Trupti Desai threatened to throw ink on his face if a case wasn't filed against him soon.

Indurikar apologized in a handwritten note saying he was tendering an apology if anyone's sentiments were hurt by his remarks. He added that some people unhappy with his work were causing additional trouble for him. While answering a notice from the health department, Indurikar flip-flopped claiming that he made no such statements and there was no event held on dates in question.

State minister Bachchu Kadu announced that there will be no charges filed against Indurikar.

On 19 June 2020, a First information report was registered in a Judicial Magistrate First Class (JMFC) court in Sangamner, Ahmednagar. He was summoned to be present in court in August.

== Personal life ==
Indurikar lives in Ozar (Bk) in Sangamner taluka in Ahmednagar district with his wife Shalinitai Deshmukh and two children. He is the founding president of Dnyaneshwar Mauil Bahu-uddesiya Sevabhavi Sanstha in Ozar (Bk), Sangamner. He runs a school in the village and is a known philanthropist in his region.

In 2019, there was a brief speculation that he may join politics with the Bharatiya Janta Party, but he quickly clarified that he won't ever contest in elections.
