= Nagar–Akola Assembly constituency =

Constituency of the Maharashtra legislative assembly in India

Nagar-Akola
- Former constituency for the Maharashtra Legislative Assembly

Constituency details
- Country: India
- Region: Western India
- State: Maharashtra
- Established: 1962
- Abolished: 2008
- Total electors: 216,871

Nagar-Akola Assembly constituency was an assembly constituency in the India state of Maharashtra.

== Members of the Legislative Assembly ==
Election	Member	Party
1962	Yeshwant Sakharam Bahangare	Indian National Congress
1967	B. K. Deshmukh	Communist Party of India
1972	Yeshwant Rao Bhangare	Indian National Congress
1978	Ashok Yashwant Bhangare	Indian National Congress
1980	Madhukar Pichad	Indian National Congress
1985	Madhukar Pichad	Indian National Congress
1990	Madhukar Pichad	Indian National Congress
1995	Madhukar Pichad	Indian National Congress
1999	Madhukar Pichad	Nationalist Congress Party
2004	Madhukar Pichad	Nationalist Congress Party

== Election results ==
=== Assembly Election 2004 ===
2004 Maharashtra Legislative Assembly election : Nagar-Akola
Party	Candidate	Votes	%	±%
NCP	Madhukar Pichad	73,405	47.97%	▲10.46
SS	Ashok Yashwant Bhangare	68,485	44.76%	▲24.79
CPI	Lahmate Yamaji Sakharam	5,064	3.31%	New
Independent	Barde Rajandra Pandhrinath	3,683	2.41%	New
BSP	Korade Khandu Ramaji	2,345	1.53%	New
Margin of victory		4,920	3.22%	▲1.31
Turnout		153,008	70.54%	▲6.05
Registered electors		216,871		▲15.55
NCP hold		Swing	▲10.46	

=== Assembly Election 1999 ===
1999 Maharashtra Legislative Assembly election : Nagar-Akola
Party	Candidate	Votes	%	±%
NCP	Madhukar Pichad	45,417	37.52%	New
INC	Ashok Yashwant Bhangare	43,107	35.61%	▼17.12
SS	Somnath Mhatarba Mengal	24,172	19.97%	▲15.52
Margin of victory		2,310	1.91%	▼20.49
Turnout		121,063	60.45%	▼15.37
Registered electors		187,690		▲1.66
NCP gain from INC		Swing	▼15.21	

=== Assembly Election 1995 ===
1995 Maharashtra Legislative Assembly election : Nagar-Akola
Party	Candidate	Votes	%	±%
INC	Madhukar Pichad	77,758	52.73%	▼2.89
Independent	Ashok Yashwant Bhangare	44,726	30.33%	New
SS	Deshmukh Vithalrao Deoram	6,552	4.44%	▲0.64
JD	Zade Dnyaneshwar Bhau	5,112	3.47%	▼29.97
Independent	Wayal Gopinath Janku	5,102	3.46%	New
BBM	Ghane Ramchandra Bhagaji	1,105	0.75%	New
Independent	Kondar Kisan Laxman	951	0.64%	New
Margin of victory		33,032	22.40%	▲0.22
Turnout		147,464	76.78%	▲17.31
Registered electors		184,625		▲11.82
INC hold		Swing	▼2.89	

=== Assembly Election 1990 ===
1990 Maharashtra Legislative Assembly election : Nagar-Akola
Party	Candidate	Votes	%	±%
INC	Madhukar Pichad	57,446	55.62%	▲6.08
JD	Ashok Yashwant Bhangare	34,539	33.44%	New
SS	Sable Kashinath Nagu	3,932	3.81%	New
Independent	Prakash Somnath Bhangare	2,103	2.04%	New
Doordarshi Party	Pawar Vikram Damu	842	0.82%	New
Independent	Wayal Gopinath Janku	726	0.70%	New
Margin of victory		22,907	22.18%	▲8.00
Turnout		103,290	60.89%	▲8.13
Registered electors		165,110		▲22.76
INC hold		Swing	▲6.08	

=== Assembly Election 1985 ===
1985 Maharashtra Legislative Assembly election : Nagar-Akola
Party	Candidate	Votes	%	±%
INC	Madhukar Pichad	36,261	49.53%	New
IC(S)	Rajaram Sakharam Bhahgare	25,883	35.36%	New
CPI	B. K. Deshmukh	5,890	8.05%	▼19.98
Independent	Narayan Ramji Deshmukh	1,922	2.63%	New
Independent	Korade Khandu Ramji	1,177	1.61%	New
Margin of victory		10,378	14.18%	▼1.07
Turnout		73,203	52.89%	▲7.95
Registered electors		134,501		▲7.41
INC gain from INC(I)		Swing	▲6.26	

=== Assembly Election 1980 ===
1980 Maharashtra Legislative Assembly election : Nagar-Akola
Party	Candidate	Votes	%	±%
INC(I)	Madhukar Pichad	25,182	43.27%	▲24.27
CPI	Mengal Sakru Budha	16,310	28.03%	▲8.09
INC(U)	Bhangare Yeshawantrao Sakharam	10,538	18.11%	New
Independent	Pawade Laxman Nanhu	2,727	4.69%	New
Independent	Talape Dattu Yamana	779	1.34%	New
Independent	Gabhale Maruti Dagadu	763	1.31%	New
Margin of victory		8,872	15.24%	▼2.37
Turnout		58,197	44.96%	▼13.23
Registered electors		125,218		▲10.50
INC(I) gain from INC		Swing	▲5.38	

=== Assembly Election 1978 ===
1978 Maharashtra Legislative Assembly election : Nagar-Akola
Party	Candidate	Votes	%	±%
INC	Ashok Yashwant Bhangare	25,636	37.89%	▼26.02
JP	Deshmukh Eknath Shankar	13,718	20.28%	New
CPI	Deshmukh Bapurao Krishnaji	13,487	19.94%	▼4.17
INC(I)	Pichand Madhukar Kashiath	12,852	19.00%	New
Margin of victory		11,918	17.62%	▼22.20
Turnout		67,652	57.97%	▲3.30
Registered electors		113,316		▲34.18
INC hold		Swing	▼26.02	

=== Assembly Election 1972 ===
1972 Maharashtra Legislative Assembly election : Nagar-Akola
Party	Candidate	Votes	%	±%
INC	Yeshwant Rao Bhangare	30,445	63.92%	▲25.46
CPI	Bapurao Deshmukh	11,482	24.11%	▼33.48
SSP	Nawali Narayan Ramaji	3,882	8.15%	New
Margin of victory		18,963	39.81%	▲20.69
Turnout		47,631	54.24%	▼11.85
Registered electors		84,451		▲10.45
INC gain from CPI		Swing		

=== Assembly Election 1967 ===
1967 Maharashtra Legislative Assembly election : Nagar-Akola
Party	Candidate	Votes	%	±%
CPI	B. K. Deshmukh	30,055	57.59%	▲23.57
INC	Y. S. Bhangare	20,073	38.46%	▲1.25
Margin of victory		9,982	19.13%	▲15.93
Turnout		52,190	65.56%	▲11.72
Registered electors		76,464		▲18.38
CPI gain from INC		Swing		

=== Assembly Election 1962 ===
1962 Maharashtra Legislative Assembly election : Nagar-Akola
Party	Candidate	Votes	%	±%
INC	Yeshwant Sakharam Bahangare	13,589	37.21%	New
CPI	Barku Alias Bapurao Krishnaji Deshmukh	12,421	34.01%	New
PSP	Eknath Shankar Deshmukh	5,973	16.36%	New
Independent	Narayan Ramji Navali	2,177	5.96%	New
Margin of victory		1,168	3.20%	
Turnout		36,517	52.88%	
Registered electors		64,593		
INC win (new seat)				
