= Lahit Khurd =

Village in Maharashtra

Coordinates: 19°24′18″N 74°3′12″E

Lahit Khurd is a village in Akole taluka of Ahmednagar district, Maharashtra State in Western India, situated on the Mula River. Khurd and Kalan are Persian language words which means small and big respectively when two villages have same name then it is distinguished as Kalan means Big and Khurd means Small with village Name.

It is located 120 km from Pune. The village has an area of 982.31 ha (1991). The population of Lahit Khurd is approximately 2,000.

Lahit Kh is approximately 24 km from Otur and around 55 km from Malshej ghat. Every year after 15 days of Gudi Padwa the festival(Jatra) of goddess Aai Muktai is performed. The rituals are religious, people from different parts of the city visit on this occasion to perform the blessing of goddess Aai muktai.

== See also ==
- Villages in Akole taluka
