= Babanrao Pachpute =

Indian politician

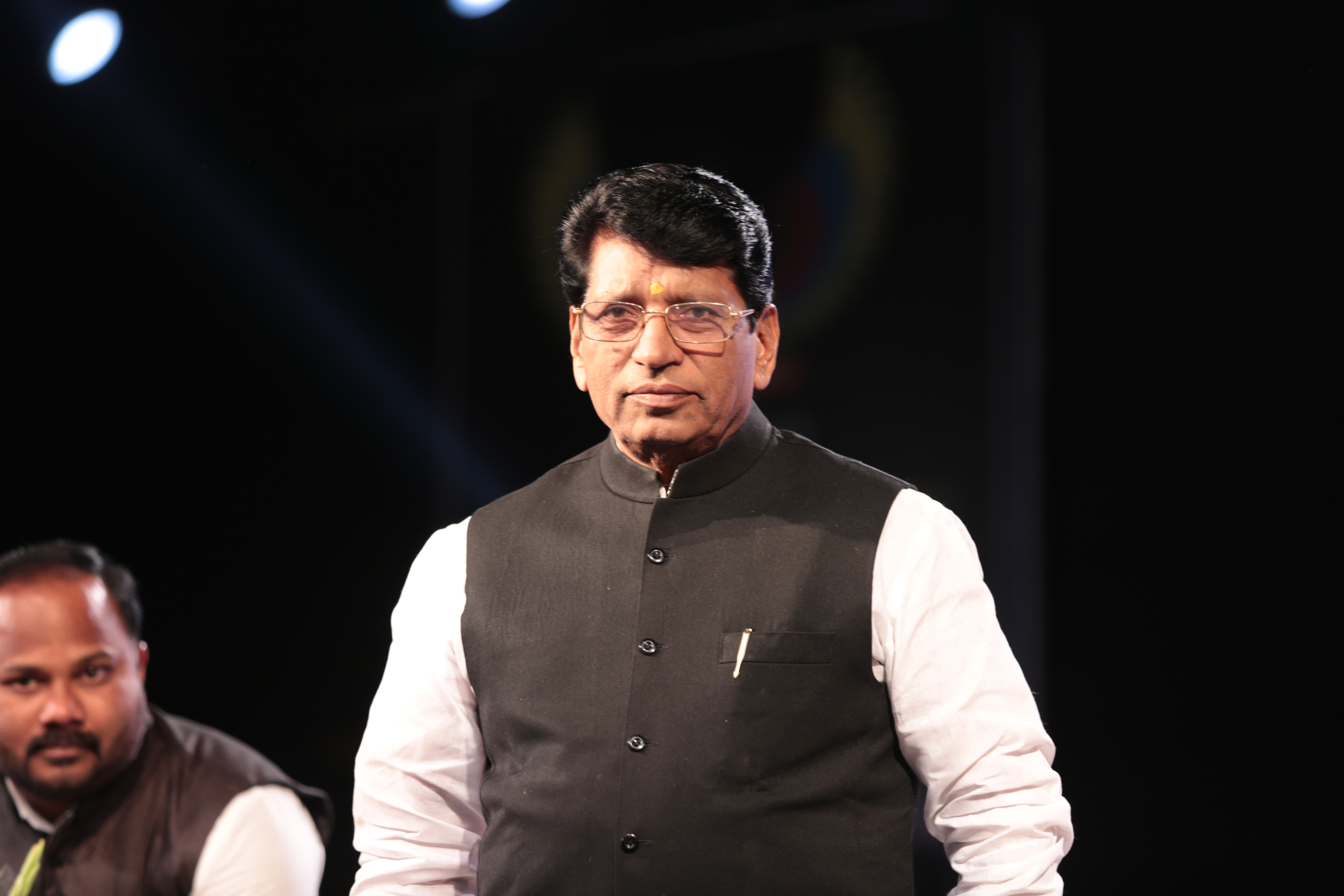

Ministry of Tribal Development Government of Maharashtra
- In office 07 Nov 2009 – 11 June 2013
- Preceded by: Vijaykumar Krishnarao Gavit
- Succeeded by: Madhukar Pichad

Ministry of Forest Government of Maharashtra
- In office 09 Nov 2004 – 06 Nov 2009
- Preceded by: R. R. Patil
- Succeeded by: Patangrao Kadam

Ministry of Home Affairs Government of Maharashtra
- In office 1991–1992

Member of the Maharashtra Legislative Assembly
- In office (1980-1985), (1985-1990), (1990-1995), (1995-1999), (2004-2009), (2009-2014), (2019 – 2024)
- Preceded by: Shivajirao Narayan Nagawade
- Succeeded by: Vikram Babanrao Pachpute
- Constituency: Shrigonda

Personal details
- Born: 9 September 1954 (age 72) Kashti Village, Shrigonda, Ahmednagar
- Party: Bhartiya Janata Party (2014-Present)
- Other political affiliations: Nationalist Congress Party (1999-2014); Indian National Congress (1995-1999); Janata Dal (1990-1995); Janata Party (1980-1990)
- Spouse: Dr. Pratibha Pachpute
- Children: Vikram Babanrao Pachpute, Pratapsinh Pachpute, Rupali Pachpute-Shirgaonkar Patil
- Parent(s): Bhikaji Pachpute & Tulsabai Pachpute
- Education: BA Honours
- Occupation: Politician

Babanrao Bhikaji Pachpute is an Indian politician from Bharatiya Janata Party. He represents the Shrigonda (Vidhan Sabha constituency) in the district of Ahmednagar, Maharashtra. His Son Vikram Babanrao Pachpute is MLA from Shrigonda since 24 November 2024.

== Early life ==
Babanrao Pachpute was born in a farmer's family in the village of Kashti, Shrigonda, Maharashtra. He is the son of Bhikaji Pachpute and Tulsabai. Since his primary education he was considered amongst the brightest students in the class. He participated extensively in extra-curricular activities such as elocution, debate and sports competitions. Family obligations deterred him from pursuing further education. But he managed to get admission into New Arts College, Ahmednagar. Along with education, he started participating in body building championship tournaments came first in Ahmednagar district and was honored with the 'Ahmednagar shree' award. His amicable nature won him many friends. While pursuing legal studies, National Emergency was declared and he actively participated in the non-co-operation movement and rose as a prominent figure in Shrigonda.

== Political career ==
1 January 1977 was his political debut. In the non-cooperation movement during emergency he raised the voice against the government. He inaugurated a branch of 'Janata Party' in Shrigonda. On 9 September 1977, he was elected as Local Body Member (Panchayat Samiti). In 1979 he established 'Shetkari Sanghatana' and was elected as member of legislative assembly in 1980. He fought for farmers' rights, started a huge movement in 1981. Babanrao Pachpute has filed nominations and has been a candidate for the Maharashtra Legislative Assembly elections nine times out of which he has won seven times. His followers give credit of this success because of the various socio-economic and educational welfare schemes he has implemented in his home turf of Shrigonda. He has been recognized as the candidate who has fought the elections every time on a different election symbol. In the assembly elections of 2019, he won and the lotus bloomed for the first time in the Shrigonda Constituency.

Maharashtra's Legislative Assembly elections journey of Babanrao Pachpute:

- In the consecutive years of 1980–85, 1985-90 he won the elections on behalf of Janata Party.
- In 1990-95 he filed nomination from Janata Dal and won the elections.
- In 1995-99 he entered the Indian National Congress Party and was victorious.
- In 1999-2004 he lost the elections but became the State President of the Nationalist Congress Party (NCP)
- In 2004-09 succeeded as an independent candidate and became the Forest Minister in the cabinet of Ministers of Maharashtra.
- In 2009-2014 won again and became the Tribal Development Minister
- In 2014 he joined the Bhartiya Janta Party (BJP), in the elections, he received more than 85,000 votes, but lost by 12,000 votes.
- In 2019, he has emerged victorious for the 7th time in the Shrigonda Constituency.
