= Wilson Dam (disambiguation) =

Wilson Dam is the name of several dams:

== India ==
- Wilson Dam (Pravara River)

== United States ==
- Wilson Dam (Alabama)
- Wilson Dam (Huerfano County, Colorado)
- Wilson Dam (Moffat County, Colorado)
- Wilson Dam (Rio Blanco County, Colorado)
- Wilson Dam (Teller County, Colorado)
- Wilson Dam (Georgia)
- Wilson Dam (Kansas)
- Wilson Dam (Missouri)
- Wilson Dam (Montana)
- Wilson Dam (North Dakota)
- Wilson Dam (Nebraska)
- Wilson Dam (Oregon)
- Wilson Dam (Pennsylvania)
- Wilson Dam (South Dakota)
- Wilson Dam (Texas)
- Wilson Dam (Virginia)
