= Shyam Jaju =

Indian politician

Ex - National Vice President of Bharatiya Janata Party

Personal details
- Born: 29 December 1957 (age 68) Ahmednagar, Maharashtra, India
- Party: Bharatiya Janata Party
- Spouse: Pratibha Jaju
- Children: 1 son 1 daughter
- Education: M.Com (Pune University) Maharastra, India
- Website: www.shyamjaju.org

Shyam Jaju (born 29 December 1957) is an Indian politician and the Ex-National Vice President of the Bharatiya Janata Party (BJP) since 2014. He hails from Maharashtra.

Shyam Jaju, born to Shri Shankar Lal and Smt. Leela Devi on 29 December 1957, belonged to Sangamner, located in Ahmednagar District of Maharashtra. Shyam Jaju completed his intermediate from Petite High School, Sangamner. He is a graduate from Sangamner College, Maharashtra. In 1977, he acquired a degree in B.Com. and in 1980 he did his Post-graduation M.Com. from BMCC, Pune.

== Early life ==
Since his school days, he is actively involved with Rashtriya Swayamsevak Sangh. He became a part of Rashtriya Swayamsevak Sangh (RSS) in 1967. He merged with Akhil Bharatiya Vidyarthi Parishad (ABVP) just after RSS. By seeing his motivation and work ethics, Shyam Jaju was appointed as the State Secretary, from 1981 to 1983 of Akhil Bharatiya Vidyarthi Parishad in the state of Maharashtra. He agitated against infiltration, on 2 October 1983, in Guwahati Satyagrah. In 1984, he became the Organizing Secretary of Delhi. From the year 1978 to 1984, Shyam Jaju was a full-time involved with Akhil Bharatiya Vidyarthi Parishad (ABVP).

Shyam Jaju married Pratibha Jaju, in Nashik, on 9 December 1987 and they had a son, Sandesh Jaju and daughter Sonali Rathi.

== Political career ==
He was always encouraged to do something beneficial for his native country. Galvanized with the tale of patriots, in the year 1988, he headed Satyagrah Andolan by the name “Goa ho ya Guwahati, apna desh apni maati” on behalf of BJP in the state of Maharashtra. He was the District President in BJP from Ahmednagar. A proficient leader, Shyam Jaju joined BJP in the year 1988 because of his expertise and administrative efficacy.

Shyam Jaju Served in organizational and training roles within Bharatiya Janata Party (BJP) in Maharashtra and was associated with cadre development efforts in regions including Ahmednagar

From 1992 to 1996, he was the District Secretary of Ahmednagar and remained as a District President of Ahmednagar from 1996 to 1998. Meanwhile, in the same year, Shyam Jaju also became the Director of Sangamner Merchants Cooperative Bank.

In the year 1998, his leadership qualities led him to be appointed as a Government Nominee Director of Pravara Rural Engineering College, Loni, Ahmednagar, North Maharashtra. Due to his charisma, in the same year, he was appointed as a member of Second Service Commission Recruitment Board.

From the year 1992 to 2002, Shyam Jaju remained at the position of State Executive Member, Maharashtra and worker training cell. He was always known to deal with complicated tasks with ease and because of such qualities, he became the Office Secretary of BJP headquarters in Delhi in the year 2002 and remained on the same post until 2005. He has been at the position of Director, since 2004, of Keshav Sehkari Cooperative Bank. Owing to his adherence and faithfulness towards his responsibility, from the year 2005 to 2011, he remained the Incharge Office Secretary of BJP headquarters. In the interest of the state of Himachal Pradesh, Shyam Jaju was appointed as the Incharge of that state from 2011 to 2013. From the year 2011 to 2014, he stayed at the post of All India National Secretary of BJP.

As a child, Shyam Jaju has always been interested in politics and due to his management skills, he came into the political field and since then, he has never looked back, instead he has moved forward in his political career. Shyam Jaju right from the year 2012 until present has stayed at the position of Vice President at All India International Vaish Federation.

Determined to enhance the governance for the benefit of nation on the grounds that he desires to do something for the nation, he was appointed as the Incharge of Punjab in the year 2013 to 2014. From the year 2014 until present, he is the Incharge of Uttarakhand state and his strong will made him the Incharge of Delhi as well. He is the Incharge of Delhi, the capital of India, since 2015.

From the year 2014 onwards, he is firmly anchored on his position of National Vice President.
