= Shrigonda Assembly constituency =

Constituency of the Maharashtra legislative assembly in India

Coordinates: 18.62°N 74.70°E

Shrigonda
- Constituency No. 226 for the Maharashtra Legislative Assembly

Constituency details
- Country: India
- Region: Western India
- State: Maharashtra
- District: Ahmednagar
- Lok Sabha constituency: Ahmednagar
- Established: 1952
- Total electors: 341,040
- Reservation: None

Member of Legislative Assembly
- 15th Maharashtra Legislative Assembly
- Incumbent Vikram Babanrao Pachpute
- Party: BJP
- Elected year: 2024

Shrigonda Assembly constituency is one of the 288 Vidhan Sabha (legislative assembly) constituencies of Maharashtra state, western India. This constituency is located in Ahmednagar district.

== Geographical scope ==
The constituency comprises Shrigonda taluka and Chichondi, Walki revenue circles of Ahmednagar taluka.

== Members of the Legislative Assembly ==
Election	Member	Party
1952	Baburao Mahadeo Bharaskar	Indian National Congress
1952	Shivrao Bhavanrao Thorat	Indian National Congress
1957	Navshervan Navrozaji Satha	Independent politician
1957	Ramchandra Devkaji Pawar	Independent politician
1962	Baburao Mahadeo Bharaskar	Indian National Congress
1967	Baburao Mahadeo Bharaskar	Indian National Congress
1972	Baburao Mahadeo Bharaskar	Independent politician
1978	Shivajirao Narayan Nagwade	Indian National Congress
1980	Babanrao Bhikaji Pachpute	Janata Party
1985	Babanrao Bhikaji Pachpute	Janata Party
1990	Babanrao Bhikaji Pachpute	Janata Dal
1995	Babanrao Bhikaji Pachpute	Indian National Congress
1999	Shivajirao Narayan Nagwade	Indian National Congress
2004	Babanrao Bhikaji Pachpute	Independent politician
2009	Babanrao Bhikaji Pachpute	Nationalist Congress Party
2014	Rahul Kundlikrao Jagtap Patil	Nationalist Congress Party
2019	Babanrao Bhikaji Pachpute	Bharatiya Janata Party
2024	Vikram Babanrao Pachpute	Bharatiya Janata Party

== Election results ==
=== Assembly Election 2024 ===
2024 Maharashtra Legislative Assembly election : Shrigonda
Party	Candidate	Votes	%	±%
BJP	Vikram Babanrao Pachpute	99,820	39.57%	▼9.66
Independent	Rahul Kundlikrao Jagtap Patil	62,664	24.84%	New
SS(UBT)	Anuradha Rajendra Nagawade	54,151	21.47%	New
VBA	Annasaheb Sitaram Shelar	28,070	11.13%	▲9.62
Independent	Suvarna Sachin Pachpute	1,725	0.68%	New
NOTA	None of the above	1,033	0.41%	▼0.34
Margin of victory		37,156	14.73%	▲12.47
Turnout		253,290	74.27%	▲6.47
Total valid votes		252,257		
Registered electors		341,040		▲9.31
BJP hold		Swing	▼9.66	

=== Assembly Election 2019 ===
2019 Maharashtra Legislative Assembly election : Shrigonda
Party	Candidate	Votes	%	±%
BJP	Babanrao Bhikaji Pachpute	103,258	49.23%	▲9.57
NCP	Ghanshyam Prataprao Shelar	98,508	46.97%	▲1.00
VBA	Machindra Pandurang Supekar	3,175	1.51%	New
NOTA	None of the above	1,575	0.75%	▲0.24
Margin of victory		4,750	2.26%	▼4.05
Turnout		211,546	67.80%	▼5.94
Total valid votes		209,736		
Registered electors		311,992		▲5.86
BJP gain from NCP		Swing	▲3.26	

=== Assembly Election 2014 ===
2014 Maharashtra Legislative Assembly election : Shrigonda
Party	Candidate	Votes	%	±%
NCP	Rahul Kundlikrao Jagtap Patil	99,281	45.97%	▲3.87
BJP	Babanrao Bhikaji Pachpute	85,644	39.66%	▲11.93
SS	Shashikant Madhavrao Gade (Sir)	22,054	10.21%	New
INC	Hemant Bhujangrao Ogale	5,113	2.37%	New
NOTA	None of the above	1,111	0.51%	New
Margin of victory		13,637	6.31%	▼8.06
Turnout		217,309	73.74%	▲1.01
Total valid votes		215,955		
Registered electors		294,710		▲12.10
NCP hold		Swing	▲3.87	

=== Assembly Election 2009 ===
2009 Maharashtra Legislative Assembly election : Shrigonda
Party	Candidate	Votes	%	±%
NCP	Babanrao Bhikaji Pachpute	80,418	42.10%	New
BJP	Rajendra Shivajirao Nagwade	52,973	27.73%	New
Independent	Annasaheb Sitaram Shelar	34,626	18.13%	New
JSS	Babasaheb Sahadu Bhos	10,543	5.52%	New
Independent	Subhash Namdeo Nimbalkar	2,695	1.41%	New
Independent	Sasane Nandu Shravan	1,871	0.98%	New
SWP	Anil Jaysing Veer	1,265	0.66%	New
BSP	Borude Banshi Baburao	1,247	0.65%	▼0.19
Margin of victory		27,445	14.37%	▲2.75
Turnout		191,208	72.73%	▼0.07
Total valid votes		191,030		
Registered electors		262,910		▲15.33
NCP gain from Independent		Swing	▲5.00	

=== Assembly Election 2004 ===
2004 Maharashtra Legislative Assembly election : Shrigonda
Party	Candidate	Votes	%	±%
Independent	Babanrao Bhikaji Pachpute	61,573	37.10%	New
INC	Shivajirao Narayanrao Nagwade	42,288	25.48%	▼21.32
Independent	Babasaheb Sahadu Bhos	39,190	23.62%	New
SBP	Anil Jaysing Ghanwat	10,772	6.49%	New
RSPS	Borude Nandkumar Sahadu	6,347	3.82%	New
Independent	Waghmare Shivaji Nana	3,092	1.86%	New
BSP	Bhade Waman Rohidas	1,396	0.84%	New
Independent	Darekar Dattatrya Mohan	1,286	0.77%	New
Margin of victory		19,285	11.62%	▲5.78
Turnout		165,965	72.80%	▼1.55
Total valid votes		165,944		
Registered electors		227,963		▲15.85
Independent gain from INC		Swing	▼9.70	

=== Assembly Election 1999 ===
1999 Maharashtra Legislative Assembly election : Shrigonda
Party	Candidate	Votes	%	±%
INC	Shivajirao Narayanrao Nagwade	64,738	46.80%	▲3.54
NCP	Babanrao Bhikaji Pachpute	56,663	40.96%	New
BJP	Kailash Shankar Shevale	15,248	11.02%	▼11.37
Independent	Pachpute Baban Jagannath	892	0.64%	New
Margin of victory		8,075	5.84%	▼6.50
Turnout		146,310	74.35%	▼6.69
Total valid votes		138,327		
Registered electors		196,782		▲3.60
INC hold		Swing	▲3.54	

=== Assembly Election 1995 ===
1995 Maharashtra Legislative Assembly election : Shrigonda
Party	Candidate	Votes	%	±%
INC	Babanrao Bhikaji Pachpute	64,957	43.26%	▲1.03
Independent	Babasaheb Sahadu Bhos	46,433	30.93%	New
BJP	Ghanshyam Prataprao Shelar	33,620	22.39%	▲17.84
Doordarshi Party	Patil Nandu Bhimrao	1,437	0.96%	▲0.34
Independent	Shaikh Amin Husen	941	0.63%	New
Margin of victory		18,524	12.34%	▲11.67
Turnout		153,931	81.04%	▲9.82
Total valid votes		150,147		
Registered electors		189,936		▲7.90
INC gain from JD		Swing	▲0.36	

=== Assembly Election 1990 ===
1990 Maharashtra Legislative Assembly election : Shrigonda
Party	Candidate	Votes	%	±%
JD	Babanrao Bhikaji Pachpute	52,738	42.90%	New
INC	Shivajirao Narayanrao Nagwade	51,920	42.23%	▲3.67
Independent	Ajinath Baburao Chede	10,376	8.44%	New
BJP	Jamdar Bapusaheb Shankarrao	5,596	4.55%	New
Doordarshi Party	Kolhe Suresh Barsu	766	0.62%	New
Margin of victory		818	0.67%	▼18.50
Turnout		125,369	71.22%	▼0.59
Total valid votes		122,935		
Registered electors		176,028		▲24.15
JD gain from JP		Swing	▼14.83	

=== Assembly Election 1985 ===
1985 Maharashtra Legislative Assembly election : Shrigonda
Party	Candidate	Votes	%	±%
JP	Babanrao Bhikaji Pachpute	57,258	57.73%	New
INC	Shivajirao Narayanrao Nagwade	38,244	38.56%	New
Independent	Anbhule Pandurang	1,946	1.96%	New
Margin of victory		19,014	19.17%	▲16.87
Turnout		101,822	71.81%	▲16.52
Total valid votes		99,185		
Registered electors		141,787		▲15.03
JP gain from JP		Swing	▲15.28	

=== Assembly Election 1980 ===
1980 Maharashtra Legislative Assembly election : Shrigonda
Party	Candidate	Votes	%	±%
JP	Babanrao Bhikaji Pachpute	27,992	42.45%	New
INC(I)	Shivajirao Narayanrao Nagwade	26,473	40.15%	New
INC(U)	Kundalikrao Ramrao Jagtap Patil	11,052	16.76%	New
JP(S)	Sarode Babasaheb Laxman	418	0.63%	New
Margin of victory		1,519	2.30%	▼16.65
Turnout		68,153	55.29%	▼10.22
Total valid votes		65,935		
Registered electors		123,264		▲12.91
JP gain from INC		Swing	▼15.79	

=== Assembly Election 1978 ===
1978 Maharashtra Legislative Assembly election : Shrigonda
Party	Candidate	Votes	%	±%
INC	Shivajirao Narayanrao Nagwade	40,102	58.24%	▲17.02
JP	Mohanrao Abaji Gade	27,054	39.29%	New
Independent	Phadnis Babasaheb	1,705	2.48%	New
Margin of victory		13,048	18.95%	▲6.30
Turnout		71,518	65.51%	▲17.97
Total valid votes		68,861		
Registered electors		109,174		▲35.97
INC gain from Independent		Swing	▲4.38	

=== Assembly Election 1972 ===
1972 Maharashtra Legislative Assembly election : Shrigonda
Party	Candidate	Votes	%	±%
Independent	Baburao Mahadeo Bharaskar	19,853	53.86%	New
INC	Shinde Prabhakar Bhaurao	15,192	41.22%	▼10.37
RPI	Ohol Wakoba Dagadoba	1,814	4.92%	▼20.90
Margin of victory		4,661	12.65%	▼13.12
Turnout		38,175	47.54%	▲3.74
Total valid votes		36,859		
Registered electors		80,294		▲17.17
Independent gain from INC		Swing	▲2.27	

=== Assembly Election 1967 ===
1967 Maharashtra Legislative Assembly election : Shrigonda
Party	Candidate	Votes	%	±%
INC	Baburao Mahadeo Bharaskar	14,263	51.59%	▼2.15
RPI	A. G. Shinde	7,139	25.82%	New
Independent	D. D. Shinde	2,670	9.66%	New
Independent	R. K. Sonagra	2,221	8.03%	New
Independent	W. D. Wakchoure	1,107	4.00%	New
Margin of victory		7,124	25.77%	▼1.31
Turnout		30,012	43.80%	▲2.67
Total valid votes		27,649		
Registered electors		68,526		▲7.60
INC hold		Swing	▼2.15	

=== Assembly Election 1962 ===
1962 Maharashtra Legislative Assembly election : Shrigonda
Party	Candidate	Votes	%	±%
INC	Baburao Mahadeo Bharaskar	12,961	53.74%	▲21.08
RPI	Prabhakar Janardhan Rohan	6,429	26.66%	New
Independent	Wakoba Dagadoba Ohol	2,860	11.86%	New
Independent	Shrawan Sawaleram Ghodke	1,869	7.75%	New
Margin of victory		6,532	27.08%	▲15.30
Turnout		26,194	41.13%	▼33.87
Total valid votes		24,119		
Registered electors		63,684		▼38.51
INC gain from Independent		Swing	▲24.35	

=== Assembly Election 1957 ===
1957 Bombay State Legislative Assembly election : Shrigonda
Party	Candidate	Votes	%	±%
Independent	Satha Navshervan Navrozaji	22,826	29.39%	New
Independent	Pawar Ramchandra Devkaji	18,703	24.08%	New
INC	Bharaskar Baburao Mahadev	13,676	17.61%	▼24.67
INC	Nimbalkar Eknath Buvasakele	11,693	15.05%	▼27.23
Independent	Patil Manikrao Narsangrao	6,428	8.28%	New
Independent	Mote Vithal Dada	4,349	5.60%	New
Margin of victory		9,150	11.78%	▲5.30
Turnout		77,675	75.00%	▲43.07
Total valid votes		77,675		
Registered electors		103,570		▼14.98
Independent gain from INC		Swing	▲5.92	

=== Assembly Election 1952 ===
1952 Bombay State Legislative Assembly election : Shrigonda
Party	Candidate	Votes	%	±%
INC	Baburao Mahadeo Bharaskar	18,254	23.47%	New
INC	Thorat Shivrao Bhavanrao	14,633	18.81%	New
Kamgar Kisan Paksha	Bhingardive Sakharam Balaji	13,217	16.99%	New
Kamgar Kisan Paksha	Bhapkar Prabhakar Kondaji	12,919	16.61%	New
PWPI	Nimbalkar Eknathrao Buwasaheb	8,433	10.84%	New
SCF	Rupwate Damodar Tatyaba	6,790	8.73%	New
Independent	Dalvi Dagdu Kondaji	2,165	2.78%	New
Independent	Shah Rajkumar Rupchand	1,378	1.77%	New
Margin of victory		5,037	6.48%	
Turnout		77,789	31.93%	
Total valid votes		77,789		
Registered electors		121,825		
INC win (new seat)				
