= Satral =

Village in Maharashtra

Satral is a village located in Rahuri Tehsil of Ahmadnagar district, Maharashtra, India. It lies on the bank of the Pravara River, a major tributary of the Godavari River. It is a gram panchayat.

Satral has a population of 4,485 in approximately 961 households.
