= Vaibhav Madhukar Pichad =

Indian politician

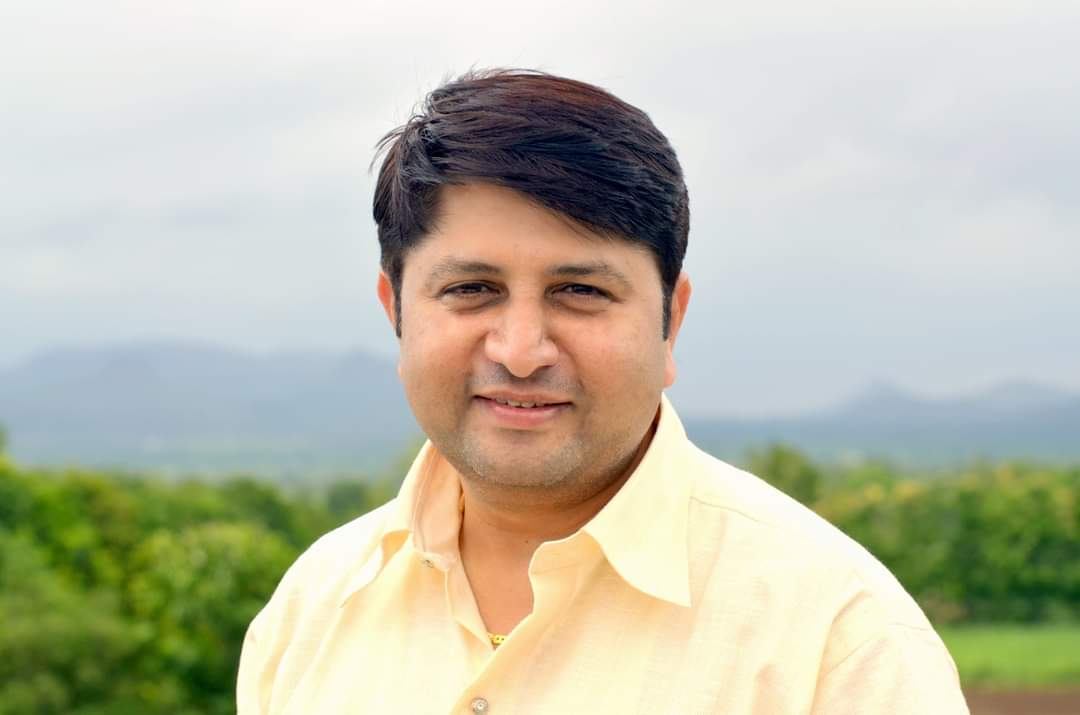

Member Of Legislative Assembly of Maharashtra
- In office 19 October 2014 – 24 October 2019
- Preceded by: Madhukar Pichad
- Succeeded by: Kiran Lahamate
- Constituency: Akole

Personal details
- Born: 27 April 1974 (age 52)
- Party: Bhartiya Janata Party

Vaibhav Madhukar Pichad is an Indian politician from Ahmednagar district. He was a Member of the 13th Maharashtra Legislative Assembly from Akole Vidhan Sabha constituency which is reserved for the candidates belonging to the Schedule Tribes. He was a Member of the Legislative Assembly in Maharashtra from Nationalist Congress Party. In 2019 he left Nationalist Congress Party and joined Bhartiya Janata Party. Currently, he is working as National Minister BJP Scheduled Tribes Morcha.

== Early life ==
Vaibhav Pichad was born on 27 April 1974. His father Madhukar Pichad was also a Member of the Legislative Assembly in Maharashtra from Akole Assembly Constituency and Tribal Minister of Maharashtra. Vaibhav Pichad is a key figure in the cooperative movement and is the chairman of a Co-Operative Milk Union Amrutsagar. Pichad was also a former member of Ahmednagar Zila Parishad.

== Political career ==
Vaibhav Pichad began his political career in the year 2000 as Youth President of the Nationalist Congress Party in Akole. In the year 2002, Vaibhav Pichad was elected as a Member of Zila Parishad Ahmednagar. In 2014, Pichad won Maharashtra State Legislative Assembly Election. Vaibhav Pichad was appointed National Minister BJP Scheduled Tribes Morcha (2021).

== Political statistics ==
Sr.No.	Year	Constituency	Opponent	Votes	Difference	Result
1	2014	Akole	Talpade Madhukar Shankar (SHS)	67696-47643	20053	Won

== Positions held ==
- 2000 - Youth President of Nationalist Congress Party Akole
- 2002 - Member of Ahmednagar Zila Parishad.
- 2014 - 2019 - Member Maharashtra State Legislative Assembly
- 2021 - National Minister Bhartiya Janata Party Scheduled Tribes Morcha
- 2022 - Director of Maharashtra State Cooperative Milk Federation(Mahananda)
- 2022 - Chairman of Co-Operative Milk Union Amrutsagar
