= Pravara =

Pravara is Sanskrit for "excellent" or "best". It may also refer to:

- Sanskrit term for the call to a Brahmin to assume priestly functions; see Upanayanam
- an invocation of Agni at the beginning of sacrifice
- Pravaras, an invocation of ancestors
- Pravara River, a river, a tributary of Godavari River in the Indian state of Maharashtra
- Pravara Rural Engineering College, Maharashtra, India
- Pravara a Hindu name
