= Nilwande Dam =

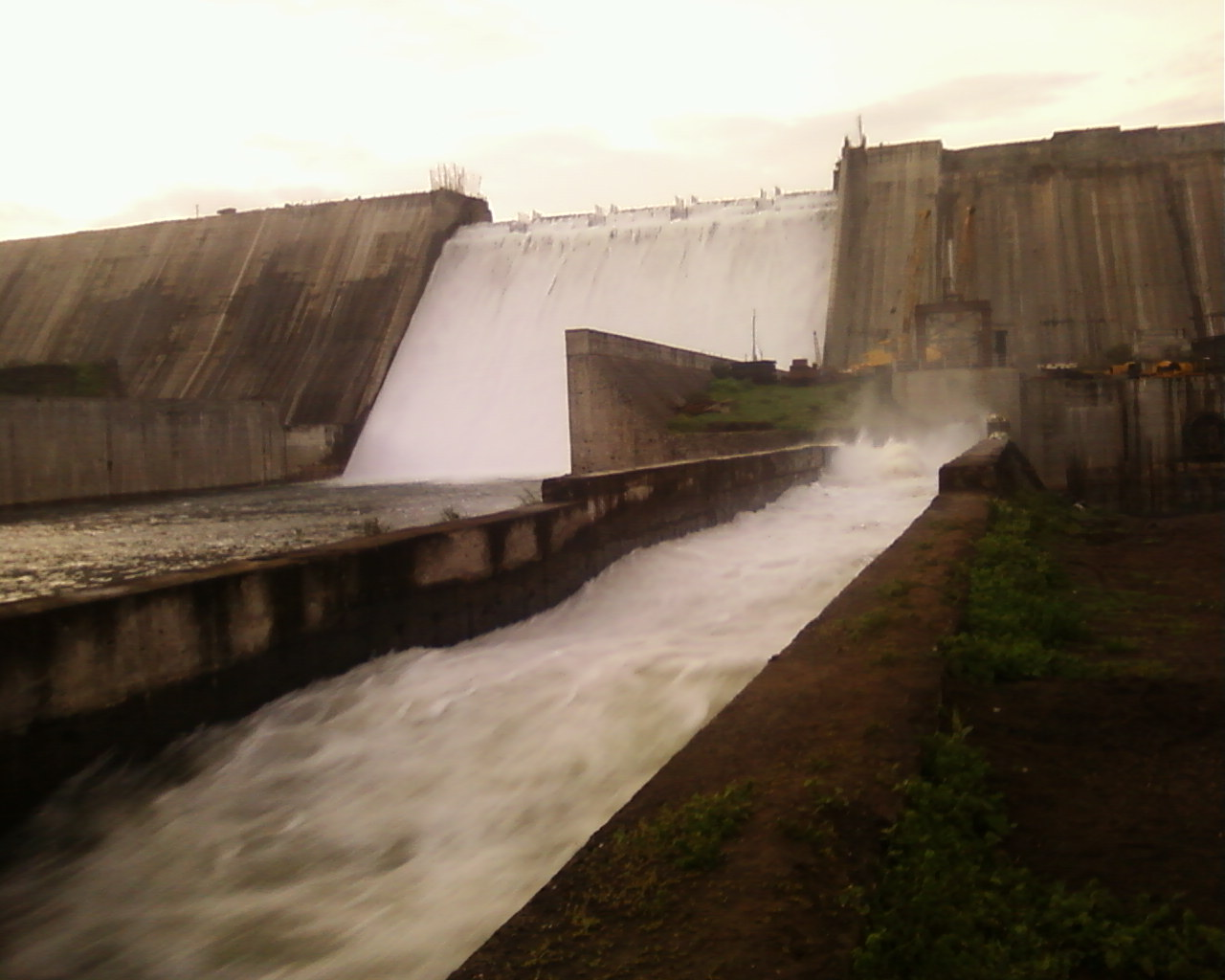
- Nilwande Dam in 2011

- Location within Maharashtra
- Official name: Upper Pravara Nilwande Dam D02986
- Location: Akole, Akole taluka, India
- Coordinates: 19°32′46″N 73°54′05″E
- Construction began: 1999
- Opening date: 2011
- Owners: Government of Maharashtra, India
- Operators: Command Area Development Authority (CADA), Ahmednagar

Dam and spillways
- Type of dam: RCC
- Impounds: Pravara River
- Height: 73.91 m (242.5 ft)
- Length: 583 m (1,913 ft)

Reservoir
- Creates: Upper Pravara Reservoir
- Catchment area: 202 km^{2} (78 sq mi)

Nilwande dam, also called Upper Pravara dam, in the Indian state of Maharashtra is the second largest dam on the Pravara river. The dam is located near Akole, Ahmednagar district.

== Specifications ==
The height of the dam above lowest foundation is 73.91 m (242.5 ft) while the length is 583 m (1,913 ft).

== Purpose ==
- Irrigation
- Domestic use

== See also ==
- List of dams and reservoirs in Maharashtra
- List of dams and reservoirs in India
