= Vikram Babanrao Pachpute =

Indian politician

Vikramsinh Babanrao Pachpute
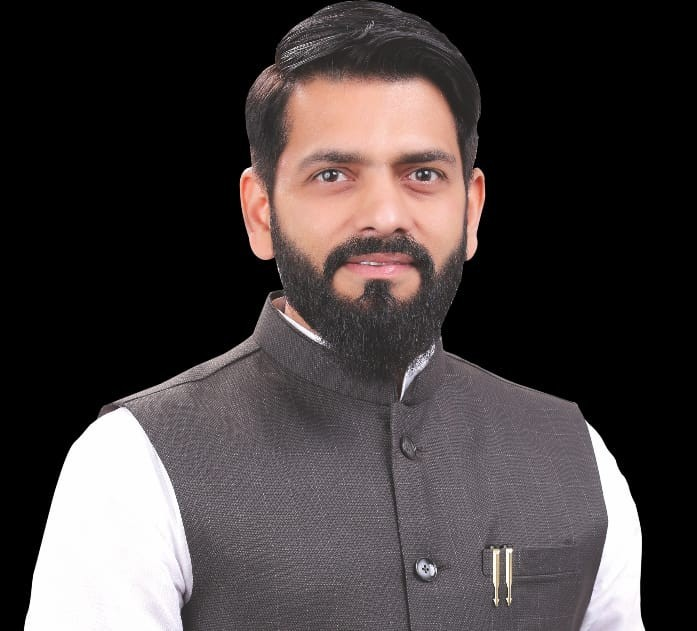

Member of the Maharashtra Legislative Assembly for Shrigonda
- Incumbent
- Assumed office 24 November 2024
- Preceded by: Babanrao Pachpute

Personal details
- Born: 2 July 1985 (age 40) Kashti Village, Shrigonda, Ahmednagar
- Citizenship: Indian
- Party: Bhartiya Janata Party
- Spouse: Dr Pallavi Naik-Pachpute
- Children: 1 Daughter Eva
- Parent: Babanrao Pachpute
- Education: MBA Finance
- Occupation: Politician

Vikram Babanrao Pachpute is an Indian politician from Bharatiya Janata Party. He is serving as a member of the Maharashtra Legislative Assembly from the Shrigonda Assembly constituency in the district of Ahmednagar, Maharashtra since 20 November 2024.

He is Secretary of Parikram Group Institution (Hon Babanrao Pachpute Vichardhara Trust) He is the son of Babanrao Pachpute, a prominent political figure. His political journey is shaped by his commitment to rural development, education, and the welfare of farmers. He aims to build upon the social, educational, and infrastructure reforms initiated by his father.

== Early life ==
Vikramsihn Pachpute was born in a farmer's family in the village of Kashti, Shrigonda, Maharashtra. He is the son of Babanrao Pachpute.

== Personal life ==
He is married to Dr. Pallavi Naik Daughter of Mansing Fattesingrao Naik a senior leader of Nationalist Congress Party (SP) and former 2 term MLA representing Shirala Assembly constituency of Sangli District.

== Legislative work ==
As a member of the Maharashtra Legislative Assembly, Vikram Pachpute has raised issues related to agriculture, farmers' welfare, rural infrastructure, electricity supply for agriculture, education, and employment. In the Maharashtra Legislative Assembly, Vikram Pachpute is known for submitting questions, calling attention motions, and discussions related to rural development and agricultural reforms. He has emphasized the need for practical implementation of government schemes at the village level.The issue of alleged sale and distribution of fake paneer and cheese products in Maharashtra was raised in the Maharashtra Legislative Assembly, drawing attention to food safety and public health concerns. Pointed that banned gutkha is easily accessible in Maharashtra

== Party positions ==
BJYM State Vice President, June 2022
