= Govindrao Adik =

Indian politician

President of Maharashtra Pradesh Congress Committee
- In office 2000–2003
- Preceded by: Prataprao Baburao Bhosale
- Succeeded by: Ranjeet Deshmukh

Member of Maharashtra Legislative Assembly
- In office 1972–1980
- Preceded by: J.W. Bankar
- Succeeded by: Bhanudas Kashinath Murkute
- Constituency: Shrirampur

Member of Maharashtra Legislative Assembly
- In office 1980–1985
- Preceded by: Uttamrao Keshavrao Patwari ( Bhalerao )
- Succeeded by: Ramkrishna Baba Patil
- Constituency: Vaijapur

Member of Parliament, Rajya Sabha
- In office 1993-2000
- Constituency: Maharashtra
- In office 2009-2012

Member of Maharashtra Legislative Council
- In office 2000–2009

Personal details
- Born: 4 January 1939 Khanapur, Bombay Province, British India
- Died: 7 June 2015 (aged 76) Mumbai, Maharashtra, India
- Party: Nationalist Congress Party
- Other political affiliations: Indian National Congress

Govindrao Wamanrao Adik (4 January 1939 – 7 June 2015) was an Indian politician. He was a member of the Nationalist Congress Party and served as a Member of Parliament in the Rajya Sabha. He began his political career as a Member of the Legislative Assembly (MLA) and he is brother of Adv. Ramrao Adik 3rd Deputy Chief Minister of Maharashtra.

On June 7, 2015, Govindrao Adik died at Bombay Hospital in Mumbai.

== Early life ==
Govindrao Wamanrao Adik was born in Khanapur village of Shrirampur Taluka on January 4, 1939, in the family of Smt. Jankibai Adik and Shri. Wamanrao Adik. Adik was the youngest in the family and had four brothers and one sister. His brothers were Adv. Ramrao Wamanrao Adik (ex. deputy chief minister of Maharashtra), Adv. Laxmanrao Wamanrao Adik, Keshavrao Wamanrao Adik, and his sister was Smt. Shantabai Rajaram Varkad. His son Avinash Govindrao Adik is the spokesperson and general secretary of NCP and his daughter Anuradha Govindrao Adik is the president of Shrirampur Municipal Council.

== Political career ==
He was instrumental in the formation of Mula Pravara Electric Cooperative Society along with late Shri. Baburao dada Tanpure of Rahuri, a senior leader in the state co-operative movement. The two were co-promoters of this electric co-operative society, which was one of five similar proposals nationally. Late Shri. Annasaheb Shinde (Former Minister of state, Agriculture, GOI) was the guiding force and supported them.

Adik become a member of the state cabinet in Maharashtra for the first time in 1978-80 and served as Minister for Irrigation, Command Area Development, and Law and Judiciary in the Progressive Democratic Front, government under the chief Ministership of Shri. Sharad Pawar. In 1989, he was appointed chairman of MSRTC (Maharashtra State Road Transport Corporation) and given status of a state cabinet minister. Adik turned the loss-making corporation into a profitable enterprise.

Adik was elected to the Rajya Sabha (Indian National Congress) from Maharashtra Legislative Assembly Constituency in a by election for the first time in 1993. He was then reelected.

At various times, he served as President of Maharashtra Pradesh Congress committee, President of Indian National Trade Union Congress (INTUC), President of Rashtriya Mill Mazdoor Sangh (RMMS), President of Maharashtra Rajya Rashtriya Sakhar Kamgar Sanghatana, and President of Maharashtra Maharashtra Rajya Rashtriya S. T. Kamgar Sanghatana.

=== Switch to Nationalist Congress Party ===
He served as Agriculture Minister in Maharashtra Cabinet from 2003 to 2005. He was an associate of Sharad Pawar before Pawar split from INC to form NCP. Adik remained in the INC. He commanded support in rural areas, especially western Maharashtra. Adik welcomed the appointment of Ashok Chavan as Chief Minister of Maharashtra and expressed hope that he would retain his clean image and restore the party's reputation. In 2009 Adik expected to be inducted into the state cabinet by Chavan. Instead, the post went to Shri Radhekrishna Vikhe Patil. This disappointed Adik, who had been expecting a berth since 2005. He then resigned from INC membership to join NCP. He later was elected again in 2009, representing NCP. He served as NCP National General Secretary.

== Electoral History ==
Position	Party	Constituency	From	To	Tenure
Member of Parliament, Rajya Sabha (1st Term)	INC	Maharashtra	3 August 1993	2 April 1994	242 days
Member of Parliament, Rajya Sabha (2nd Term)	INC	Maharashtra	3 April 1994	2 April 2000	5 years, 365 days
Member of Parliament, Rajya Sabha (3rd Term)	NCP	Maharashtra	4 August 2009	2 April 2012	2 years, 242 days
