= Akole =

- City
- Location in Maharashtra, India
- Country: India
- State: Maharashtra
- District: Ahmednagar District

Government
  - Body: Nagarpanchaayat
- Elevation: 593 m (1,946 ft)

Population (2011)
  - Total: 18,278

Languages
  - Official: Marathi
- Time zone: UTC+5:30 (IST)
- PIN: 422 601
- Telephone code: 02424
- Vehicle registration: MH-17
- Coastline: 0 kilometres (0 mi)
- Nearest city: Sangamner
- Lok Sabha constituency: Shirdi
- Civic agency: Nagarpanchaayat

Akole is a city and taluka in the Akole tehsil of Ahmednagar District, Maharashtra, India. It is situated within the Sahyadri Mountains of the Western Ghats. The city has several historical sites that reflect its connection to the history and culture of Maharashtra.

== History ==
According to local beliefs, Lord Rama visited Akole during his 14-year exile, known as Vanvaas. Additionally, it is said that King Harishchandra built the Harishchandragad fort for his wife, Taramati, in the Akole tehsil. Great Maratha emperor Shivaji Maharaj visited Vishramgad in Akole after his campaign in Surat, where he stayed for 30 days to recuperate from the exhaustion of his tour.

== Geography ==
Kalsubai is the highest peak in Maharashtra, with an elevation of 1,646 meters (5,400 feet). Ghatghar, located 22 kilometers (14 miles) from Bhandardara, offers views of the Sahyadri range and is the site of the Udanchan Hydro-power project's first installation, which has a capacity of 250 MW. Additionally, Kokan Kada, situated near Harishchandragad, is known for its flat, sharp, and deeply edged mountainous terrain.

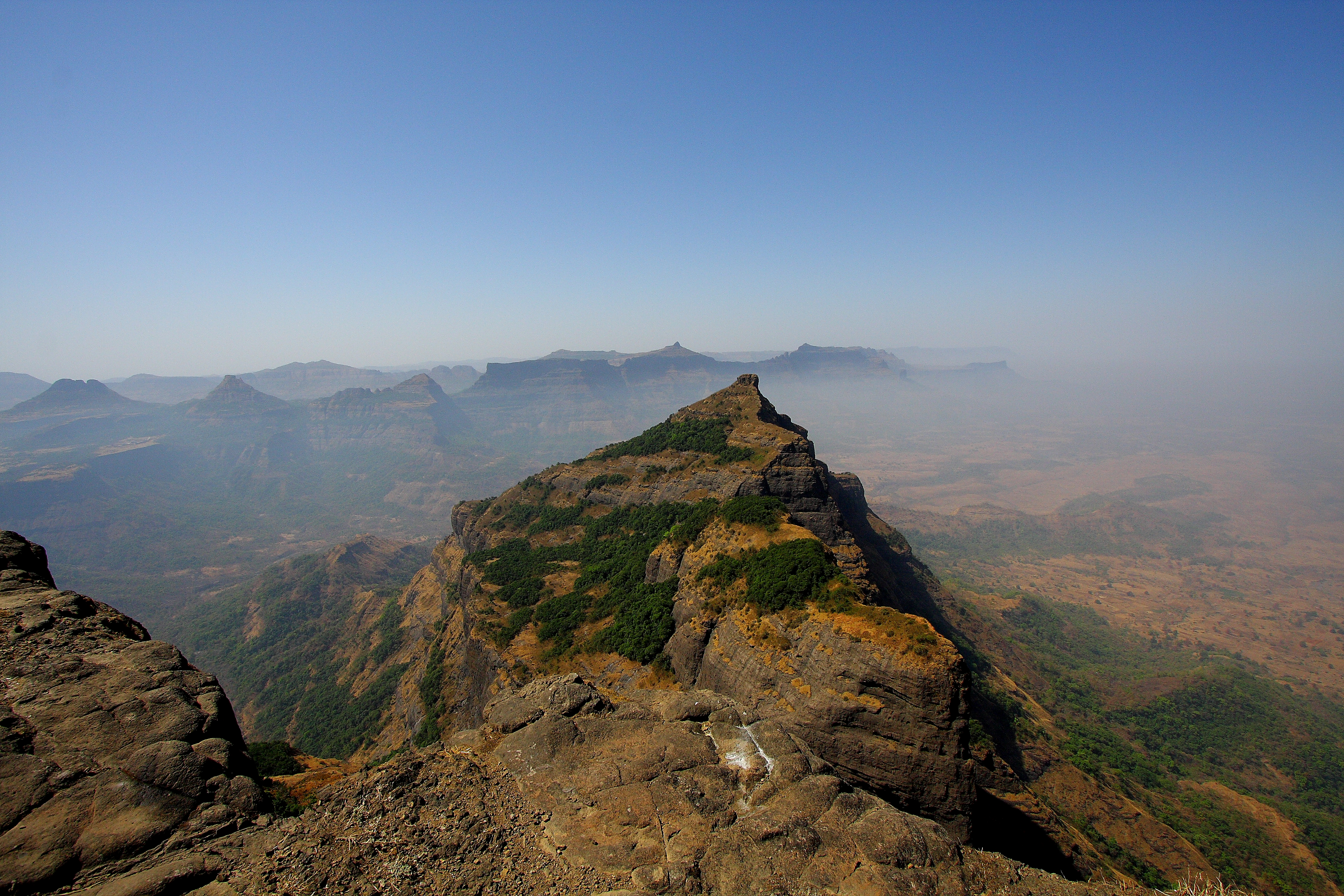
Konkan Kada

=== River and irrigation projects ===
The Pravara River, a major tributary of the Godavari River, flows through the region and holds both historical and mythological significance. The Mula River originates on the eastern slopes of the Sahyadris, between Ratangad and Harichandragad, and for the first 20 miles, it flows parallel to the Pravara, draining the southern part of Akole taluka.

The Bhandardara Dam, also known as Wilson Dam, was constructed in 1910 and is situated approximately 150 meters (490 feet) above sea level. Nearby, Umbrella Falls, named for its resemblance to an umbrella, is a local waterfall.

Randha Falls, standing 45 meters (148 feet) high, is about 11 kilometers (6.8 miles) from Wilson Dam. It serves as a source of hydroelectricity and is a popular tourist destination in Bhandardara, having been featured in Bollywood films such as Maine Pyaar Kiya and Raju Chacha. The Nilwande Dam, built on the Pravara River, is also used for generating hydroelectricity.

== Historical sites ==
Agasti Rishi Ashram, located on the banks of the Pravara River, is associated with the Ramayana, where it is believed that Lord Ram, Lakshman and Sita visited Sage Agastya. The sage reportedly provided Lord Ram with a miraculous arrow used to kill Ravan.

The Amruteshwar Temple, at the entrance of Ratanwadi, is over 1,200 years old and dedicated to Lord Shiva. Constructed in the Hemadpanthi architectural style, it features rock carvings on the main shrine.

The Jagdamba Temple in Tahakari village is a Hemadpanthi temple known for its wooden sculpture of the deity Apsaras. Located on the bank of the Aadhala River, it is one of the notable temples in Ahmednagar District. The temple hosts the Jagdamba Mata festival twice annually: Chaitra Pournima, a two-day Yatra attracting visitors from nearby areas, and Navratri, a nine-night festival dedicated to Goddess Jagdamba.

Patta Fort, also known as Vishramgad, and the Kalseshwar Temple in Kalas Bk near Akole, situated on a mountain surrounded by the Pravara River, are popular trekking destinations. Koltembhe, a village at the foothills of Ghanchakkar Peak, and Deothan, 12 kilometers (7.5 miles) from Akole, are near several scenic locations and temples.

The Shree Gangadhareshwar Temple, built in 1782 by Sardar Potnis from Gwalior, is designed in the Hemadpanti style and situated on a 30-foot-high platform in Akole, a short walk from the ST stand.

== Villages ==
Akole taluka encompasses several small and large villages, including Mehenduri, Balthan, Maveshi, Rumbhodi, Rajur, Kotul, Lingdev, Lahit Khurd, Dhamangaon Awari, Nawalewadi, Dhumalwadi, Virgaon, Samsherpur, Unchakhadak, Indori, Ambad, Dhamangaon P, Brahmanwada, and Sugaon.

== Places of interest ==
=== Sandhan Valley ===
Sandhan Valley, often referred to as "The Great Canyon" of the Sahyadri ranges, is a combination of a canyon and a valley. Situated near Samrad village in the Akole tehsil of Punya Shlok Ahilyadevi Nagar district, close to Ratangad Fort, it is also known as the Valley of Shadows. Surrounded by the Ratangad and Kalsubai mountains, the valley is located at an elevation of 4,255 feet above sea level. The trek through Sandhan Valley involves navigating a 200-foot-deep and 2-kilometer-long gorge carved by water between narrow walls. In the film Tanhaji: The Unsung Warrior, Sandhan Valley was recreated to depict a battle scene between the Mughal army and the Marathas.
