= Ghatghar Dam =

Dam in India

Ghatghar Dams
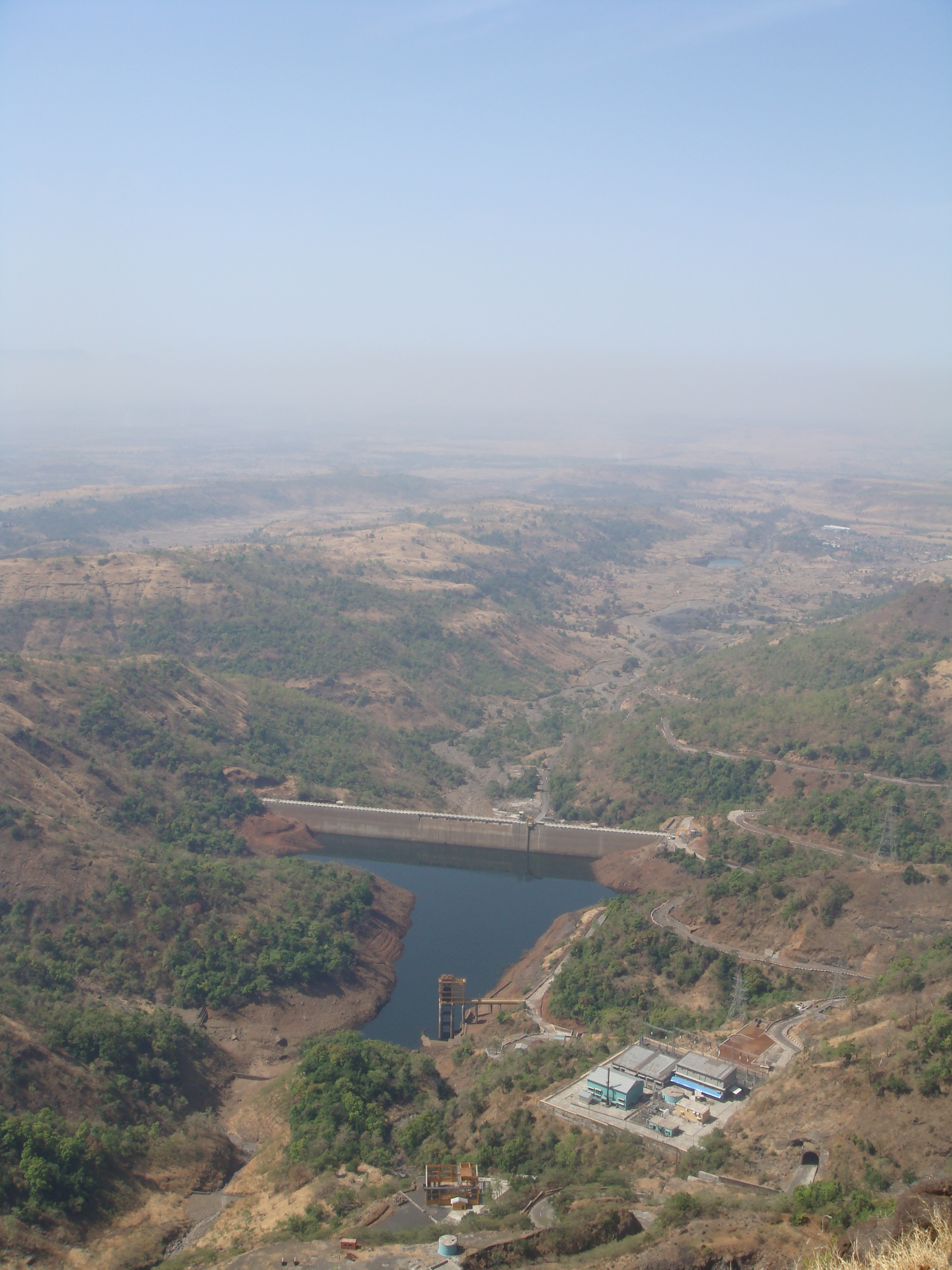

- Location within India
- Country: India
- Location: chonde
- Coordinates: 19°32′34.44″N 73°39′53.31″E
- Purpose: Power
- Status: Operational
- Construction began: 1995
- Opening date: 2006; 20 years ago

Dam and spillways
- Type of dam: Gravity, roller-compacted concrete
- Impounds: Upper: Pravara River; Lower: Shahi Nalla River
- Height: Upper: 15 m (49 ft); Lower: 86 m (282 ft)
- Length: Upper: 503 m (1,650 ft); Lower: 447 m (1,467 ft)

Power Station
- Commission date: 2008
- Turbines: 2 x 125 MW reversible Francis-type
- Installed capacity: 250 MW

Ghatghar Dam refers to two associated gravity dams built using roller-compacted concrete, the first use in India. They are situated in Ghatghar village, in Ahmednagar district Maharashtra, India. Both dams create a lower and upper reservoir for the 250 MW pumped-storage hydroelectric power station. The upper Ghatghar Dam is 15 m (49 ft) tall and is on the Pravara River, a tributary of the Godavari River. The lower Ghatghar Dam is 86 m (282 ft) tall and located on the Shahi Nalla which is a tributary of Ulhas River to the southwest of the upper reservoir in a steep valley. The hydro power project diverts Godavari River basin water outside the basin area to a west flowing river of Western Ghats.

The power station is located between both the upper and lower reservoirs. During peak electricity demand hours, water from the upper reservoir turns two 125 MW reversible Francis turbine-generators. When energy demand is low, such as at night, the turbines reverse direction and pump water from the lower reservoir back to the upper. Construction on the project began in 1995, the dams were placed beginning in 2001 and were complete by 2006. The power station was commissioned in 2008.

== Power Plant ==
The dam's power plant has an installed capacity of 250 MW.

Stage	Unit Number	Installed Capacity (MW)	Date of Commissioning	Status
1	1	125	2008	Operational
1	2	125	2008	Operational

== See also ==
Middle Vaitarna Dam
