= Lahu Kanade =

Indian politician

Member of Maharashtra Legislative Assembly
- In office 2019–2024
- Preceded by: Bhausaheb Malhari Kamble
- Succeeded by: Hemant Ogale
- Constituency: Shrirampur

Personal details
- Party: Indian National Congress
- Occupation: Politician

Lahu Natha Kanade is a leader of Indian National Congress and a member of the Maharashtra Legislative Assembly elected from Shrirampur Assembly constituency in Ahmednagar city.

== Positions held ==
- 2019: Elected to Maharashtra Legislative Assembly.
