= Sadashiv Lokhande =

Indian politician

Member of Parliament, Lok Sabha
- In office 14 May 2014 – 04 June 2024
- Preceded by: Bhausaheb Rajaram Wakchaure
- Constituency: Shirdi

Member of Maharashtra Legislative Assembly
- In office 1995–2009
- Preceded by: Vittal Bhailume
- Succeeded by: Ram Shinde
- Constituency: Karjat Jamkhed

Personal details
- Born: 1 June 1962 (age 64) Ahmadnagar, Maharashtra, India
- Party: Shiv Sena
- Spouse: Nanda (m. 1984)
- Children: 3 sons, Dr. Chetan Sadashiv Lokhande Prashant Sadashiv Lokhande Raj Sadashiv Lokhande
- Parents: Kisan Lokhande (father); Kerabai Lokhande (mother)
- Occupation: Politician

Sadashiv Kisan Lokhande is a member of the 17th Lok Sabha of India. He represents the Shirdi constituency of Maharashtra and is a member of the Shiv Sena political party. After the split in Shiv Sena, Sadashiv Lokhande left Uddhav Thackeray's team and went with Eknath Shinde's.

He was also elected to the Maharashtra Legislative Assembly from Karjat Vidhan Sabha constituency in Ahmednagar district for three consecutive terms in 1995, 1999 and 2004 as a BJP candidate.

== Positions held ==
- 1995: Elected to Maharashtra Legislative Assembly (1st term)
- 1999: Re-elected to Maharashtra Legislative Assembly (2nd term)
- 2004: Re-elected to Maharashtra Legislative Assembly (3rd term)
- 2014: Elected to 16th Lok Sabha (1st Term)
- 2019: Re-Elected to 17th Lok Sabha (2nd Term)
