= Shrirampur Assembly constituency =

Constituency of the Maharashtra legislative assembly in India

Coordinates: 19.62°N 74.66°E

Shrirampur
- Constituency No. 220 for the Maharashtra Legislative Assembly

Constituency details
- Country: India
- Region: Western India
- State: Maharashtra
- District: Ahilyanagar
- Lok Sabha constituency: Shirdi
- Established: 1962
- Total electors: 309,518
- Reservation: SC

Member of Legislative Assembly
- 15th Maharashtra Legislative Assembly
- Incumbent Hemant Ogale
- Party: INC
- Alliance: MVA
- Elected year: 2024

Shrirampur Assembly constituency is one of the 288 Vidhan Sabha (legislative assembly) constituencies of Maharashtra state, western India. This constituency is located in Ahilyanagar district.

== Geographical scope ==
The constituency comprises Shrirampur taluka and Deolali revenue circle and Deolali Pravara Municipal Council belonging to Rahuri taluka.

== Members of the Legislative Assembly ==
Year	Member	Party
1962	Baburao Chaturbhuj	Indian National Congress
1967	J. W. Bankar	Indian National Congress
1972	Govindrao Adik	Indian National Congress
1978	Govindrao Adik	Indian National Congress
1980	Bhanudas Murkute	Indian National Congress (I)
1985	Daulatrao Pawar	Indian Congress (Socialist)
1990	Bhanudas Murkute	Janata Dal
1995	Bhanudas Murkute	Indian National Congress
1999	Jayant Sasane	Indian National Congress
2004	Jayant Sasane	Indian National Congress
2009	Bhausaheb Kamble	Indian National Congress
2014	Bhausaheb Kamble	Indian National Congress
2019	Lahu Kanade	Indian National Congress
2024	Hemant Ogale	Indian National Congress

== Election results ==
=== Assembly Election 2024 ===
2024 Maharashtra Legislative Assembly election : Shrirampur
Party	Candidate	Votes	%	±%
INC	Hemant Bhujangrao Ogale	66,099	30.31	▼21.15
SHS	Bhausaheb Malhari Kamble	52,726	24.18	▼16.88
Independent	Sagar Ashok Beg	47,860	21.95	New
NCP	Lahu Kanade	42,571	19.52	New
VBA	Anand Alias Annasaheb Appaji Mohan	2,222	1.02	New
MSP	Jitendra Ashok Torane	1,973	0.90	New
MNS	Raju Natha Kapse	1,324	0.61	▼0.30
NOTA	None of the Above	675	0.31	▼0.86
Margin of victory		13,373	6.13	▼4.28
Turnout		218,755	70.68	▲7.03
Total valid votes		218,080		
Registered electors		309,518		
INC hold		Swing	▼21.15	

=== Assembly Election 2019 ===
2019 Maharashtra Legislative Assembly election : Shrirampur
Party	Candidate	Votes	%	±%
INC	Lahu Kanade	93,906	51.46	▲19.92
SS	Bhausaheb Malhari Kamble	74,912	41.05	▲20.30
Independent	Dr. Sudhir Radhaji Kshirsagar	5,539	3.04	New
Independent	Jadhav Ramchandra Namdeo	2,148	1.18	New
NOTA	None of the Above	2,133	1.17	▲0.43
MNS	Pagare Bhausaheb Shankar	1,647	0.90	New
Margin of victory		18,994	10.41	▲4.07
Turnout		184,672		▼4.91
Total valid votes		182,473		
Registered electors		287,700		
INC hold		Swing	▲19.92	

=== Assembly Election 2014 ===
2014 Maharashtra Legislative Assembly election : Shrirampur
Party	Candidate	Votes	%	±%
INC	Bhausaheb Malhari Kamble	57,118	31.54	▼7.27
BJP	Bhausaheb Rajaram Wakchaure	45,634	25.20	New
SS	Lahu Kanade	37,580	20.75	▼4.50
NCP	Gaikwad Sunita Milind	35,095	19.38	New
BSP	Jadhav Swapnil Ramchandra	1,450	0.80	New
NOTA	None of the Above	1,342	0.74	New
Margin of victory		11,484	6.34	▼7.22
Turnout		182,496		▲4.65
Total valid votes		181,074		
Registered electors		264,965		
INC hold		Swing	▼7.27	

=== Assembly Election 2009 ===
2009 Maharashtra Legislative Assembly election : Shrirampur
Party	Candidate	Votes	%	±%
INC	Bhausaheb Malhari Kamble	59,819	38.81	▼10.90
SS	Dolas Bhausaheb Karbhari	38,922	25.25	▼18.67
Independent	Shinde Vijay Prabhakar	20,237	13.13	New
RPI(A)	Kapase Genu Natha	19,659	12.76	New
Independent	Pagare Bahusaheb Shankar	2,503	1.62	New
Independent	Chhaya Dagdu Sarode	1,704	1.11	New
Independent	Bagul Ashok Nivrutti	1,416	0.92	New
Margin of victory		20,897	13.56	▲7.77
Turnout		154,262	63.75	▼10.51
Total valid votes		154,118		
Registered electors		241,973		▲45.09
INC hold		Swing	▼10.90	

=== Assembly Election 2004 ===
2004 Maharashtra Legislative Assembly election : Shrirampur
Party	Candidate	Votes	%	±%
INC	Jayant Murlidhar Sasane	61,521	49.71	▲11.92
SS	Murkute Bhanudas Kashinath	54,358	43.92	▲21.62
Independent	Sasane Dilip Munjaba	1,707	1.38	New
Independent	Solanki Raju Dadu	1,677	1.36	New
BSP	Vijayrao Govindrao Khajekar	1,650	1.33	New
Independent	Shelke Simon Dagadu	801	0.65	New
Margin of victory		7,163	5.79	▲5.09
Turnout		123,785	74.22	▲7.93
Total valid votes		123,758		
Registered electors		166,780		▲15.86
INC hold		Swing	▲11.92	

=== Assembly Election 1999 ===
1999 Maharashtra Legislative Assembly election : Shrirampur
Party	Candidate	Votes	%	±%
INC	Jayant Murlidhar Sasane	36,053	37.79	▼13.84
NCP	Murkute Bhanudas Kashinath	35,384	37.09	New
SS	Anil Shamrao Kamble	21,280	22.31	▲18.86
CPI	Thorat Annasaheb Laxman	1,111	1.16	▼1.96
ABS	Rajendra Ramrao Pathade	1,015	1.06	New
Margin of victory		669	0.70	▼16.60
Turnout		101,261	70.35	▼8.17
Total valid votes		95,396		
Registered electors		143,946		▲1.47
INC hold		Swing	▼13.84	

=== Assembly Election 1995 ===
1995 Maharashtra Legislative Assembly election : Shrirampur
Party	Candidate	Votes	%	±%
INC	Murkute Bhanudas Kashinath	54,522	51.63	▲5.30
Independent	Kamble Anil Shamrao	36,256	34.33	New
SS	Thore Ashokrao Alias Mhatardeo Dnyanoba	3,635	3.44	▲1.78
CPI	Bawake Bhimaji Rabhaji	3,295	3.12	New
BSP	Labade Appasaheb Rangnath	2,627	2.49	▲1.98
Independent	Kale Yeshwant Rambhau	1,599	1.51	New
JD	Kshirsagar Janardan Tukaram	1,428	1.35	▼48.20
Margin of victory		18,266	17.30	▲14.08
Turnout		108,363	76.39	▲10.81
Total valid votes		105,596		
Registered electors		141,859		▲1.67
INC gain from JD		Swing	▲2.08	

=== Assembly Election 1990 ===
1990 Maharashtra Legislative Assembly election : Shrirampur
Party	Candidate	Votes	%	±%
JD	Murkute Bhanudas Kashinath	43,993	49.55	New
INC	Govindrao Wamanrao Adik	41,139	46.33	▲6.69
SS	Vani Vimal Vishwanath	1,473	1.66	New
Independent	Alhat Ashok Vithalrao	742	0.84	New
Margin of victory		2,854	3.21	▼6.07
Turnout		90,222	64.66	▲3.26
Total valid votes		88,787		
Registered electors		139,532		▲25.18
JD gain from IC(S)		Swing	▲0.61	

=== Assembly Election 1985 ===
1985 Maharashtra Legislative Assembly election : Shrirampur
Party	Candidate	Votes	%	±%
IC(S)	Daulatrao Malhari Pawar	32,929	48.94	New
INC	Jathar Suresh Govindrao	26,680	39.65	New
Independent	Kolase Narayanrao Sahebrao	2,992	4.45	New
Independent	Bavake Bhimaji Rabhaji	2,737	4.07	New
Independent	Gaikwad Dnyaneshwar Anandrao	590	0.88	New
Margin of victory		6,249	9.29	▼26.04
Turnout		68,443	61.41	▼3.45
Total valid votes		67,291		
Registered electors		111,461		▲8.70
IC(S) gain from INC(I)		Swing	▼15.39	

=== Assembly Election 1980 ===
1980 Maharashtra Legislative Assembly election : Shrirampur
Party	Candidate	Votes	%	±%
INC(I)	Murkute Bhanudas Kashinath	42,097	64.32	New
INC(U)	Govindrao Wamanrao Adik	18,975	28.99	New
Independent	Ranshur Vasant Bajirao	4,374	6.68	New
Margin of victory		23,122	35.33	▲26.90
Turnout		66,780	65.12	▼12.79
Total valid votes		65,446		
Registered electors		102,542		▲11.79
INC(I) gain from INC		Swing	▲14.51	

=== Assembly Election 1978 ===
1978 Maharashtra Legislative Assembly election : Shrirampur
Party	Candidate	Votes	%	±%
INC	Govindrao Wamanrao Adik	35,009	49.81	▼3.51
JP	Tekawade Janardanrao Yashwantrao	29,086	41.39	New
Independent	Ranshur Vasant Bajirao	5,456	7.76	New
CPI	Shinde Pandurang Ganpat	730	1.04	New
Margin of victory		5,923	8.43	▼5.53
Turnout		72,616	79.16	▲10.04
Total valid votes		70,281		
Registered electors		91,731		▲7.57
INC hold		Swing	▼3.51	

=== Assembly Election 1972 ===
1972 Maharashtra Legislative Assembly election : Shrirampur
Party	Candidate	Votes	%	±%
INC	Govindrao Wamanrao Adik	30,276	53.33	▼2.94
Independent	Bhaskarrao Galande	22,350	39.37	New
RPI	Wamanrao Wakchaure	3,716	6.55	New
RPI(K)	Kharat Pavalasshankarrao	433	0.76	New
Margin of victory		7,926	13.96	▼10.30
Turnout		58,833	68.99	▲8.19
Total valid votes		56,775		
Registered electors		85,278		▲21.47
INC hold		Swing	▼2.94	

=== Assembly Election 1967 ===
1967 Maharashtra Legislative Assembly election : Shrirampur
Party	Candidate	Votes	%	±%
INC	J. W. Bankar	23,066	56.27	▼3.45
PSP	G. J. Ogale	13,120	32.01	New
ABJS	S. R. Wajadame	4,807	11.73	New
Margin of victory		9,946	24.26	▼8.77
Turnout		44,963	64.04	▲8.64
Total valid votes		40,993		
Registered electors		70,207		▲6.31
INC hold		Swing	▼3.45	

=== Assembly Election 1962 ===
1962 Maharashtra Legislative Assembly election : Shrirampur
Party	Candidate	Votes	%	±%
INC	Baburao Sawleram Chaturbhuj	19,619	59.72	New
RPI	Waman Damodhar Wakchaure	8,769	26.69	New
Independent	Ambadas Gangaram Shinde	4,463	13.59	New
Margin of victory		10,850	33.03	
Turnout		34,813	52.72	
Total valid votes		32,851		
Registered electors		66,037		
INC win (new seat)				
