= Adgaon Kh =

Village in Maharashtra, India

Adgaon Kh, is a small village in the Indian state of Maharashtra. Adgaon Kh village is 548898. It is located in Aurangabad Tehsil of Aurangabad district, Maharashtra, India.

== Geography ==
It is located 35 km away from sub-district headquarter Aurangabad. The total geographical area of Adgaon Kh is 1063.17 hectares. The village has a total population of 2,473.

== See also ==
- List of villages in Akole taluka
- Aurangabad district, Maharashtra
