= Patta Fort =

Fort in Maharashtra, India

- Part of Kalsubai Hill Range
- Ahmednagar district, Maharashtra
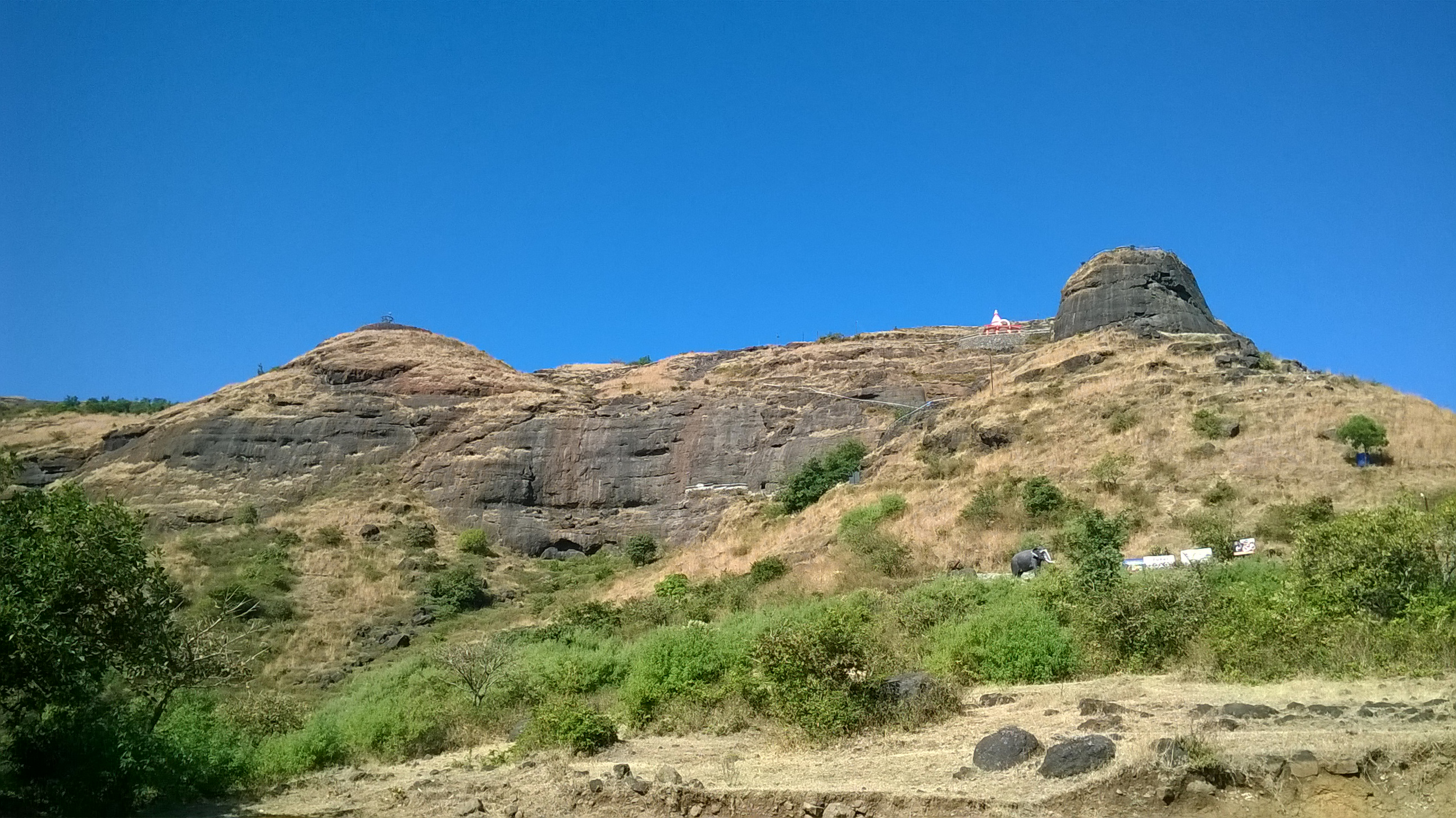
- Patta fort from Pattewadi village

Site information
- Type: Hill fort
- Owner: Government of India
- Open to the public: Yes
- Condition: Good condition

Location
- Shown within Maharashtra
- Coordinates: 19°42′26.2″N 73°50′10.6″E
- Height: 4562 Ft.

Site history
- Materials: Stone

Patta Fort, or Patta Killa, also known as Vishramgad, is a fort situated between Nasik and Ahmadnagar in Maharashtra, India. The Indian ruler Chatrapati Shivaji I Maharaj once visited and rested there. The residents of Patta Killa are known as Pattekar, meaning "residents of Fort Patta". Patta Fort stands approximately 1,392 metres (4,567 ft) above sea level.

== History ==
The fort was located in the Bahmani Sultanate. In 1490, when the Bahamani Empire was divided, the fort was taken over by Nizam of Ahmednagar. In 1627, it was conquered by the Mughals. In 1671, Moropant Pingale seized the fort, but the Mughals retook it again in 1672. In 1675, the fort was taken over by Moropant Pingale.

Patta was once at the border of the Swarajya. Shivaji Maharaj arrived at this fort in November 1679 after fleeing the battle at Jalnapur. The Mughal army trapped him on three sides. Thanks to Bahirji Naik, a spy and military commander, Shivaji was able to reach Patta safely.

On 11 January 1688, the fort was occupied by the Mughul army headed by Matabar Khan. He appointed Govindsingh of Bhagur as the fort's chief. Peshwas later seized the fort in 1761. In 1818, the fort was conquered by the British army.

== Places to See ==
Patta Fort is straightforward to climb. During the full moon (Poornima), the disciples of Laxmangiri gather at these caves. The 'Ambarkhana' is a large, newly reconstructed hall which can accommodate about 200 visitors for overnight stays.

A rock-cut cistern exists near Ambarkhana. With villagers' help, the forest department has developed pathways, steps, and a gazebo around the fort.

Many wind turbines have been erected on the way to Pattewadi, constructed by Enercon.

In the Bhavarth Ramayana written by Eknath, Patta Fort and Aundha Fort are mentioned.
