= Bhausaheb Malhari Kamble =

Indian politician

Bhausaheb Kamble

Member of Maharashtra Legislative Assembly
- In office 2009–2019
- Preceded by: Jayant Murlidhar Sasane
- Succeeded by: Lahu Kanade
- Constituency: Shrirampur

Personal details
- Party: Shiv Sena

Bhausaheb Kamble is an Indian politician from Maharashtra and member of the Shiv Sena. He is a two term Member of the Maharashtra Legislative Assembly from Shrirampur constituency.

== Positions held ==
- 2009: Elected as Member of Maharashtra Legislative Assembly
- 2014: Re-Elected as Member of Maharashtra Legislative Assembly
