= Shirdi Lok Sabha constituency =

Lok Sabha constituency in Maharashtra

Coordinates: 19.8°N 74.5°E

Shirdi
- Lok Sabha constituency
- Shirdi Lok Sabha Constituency map

Constituency details
- Country: India
- Region: Western India
- State: Maharashtra
- Assembly constituencies: Akole; Sangamner; Shirdi; Kopargaon; Shrirampur; Nevasa
- Established: 2008
- Total electors: 16,77,335 (2024)
- Reservation: SC

Member of Parliament
- 18th Lok Sabha
- Incumbent Bhausaheb Rajaram Wakchaure
- Party: SHS
- Alliance: NDA
- Elected year: 2024
- Preceded by: Sadashiv Lokhande

Shirdi is one of the 48 Lok Sabha (lower house of Indian parliament) constituencies of the Indian state of Maharashtra. This constituency was created on 19 February 2008 as a part of the implementation of the Presidential notification based on the recommendations of the Delimitation Commission of India constituted on 12 July 2002. This constituency is one of the two Lok Sabha constituencies in Ahmednagar district. It first held elections in 2009 and its first member of parliament (MP) was Bhausaheb Rajaram Wakchaure of Shiv Sena. As of the 2024 elections, its current MP is Bhausaheb Rajaram Wakchaure also of Shiv Sena (UBT) .

== Assembly segments ==
Currently, the Shirdi Lok Sabha constituency comprises six Vidhan Sabha (legislative assembly) segments. These segments are:

No	Name	District	Member	Party	Winning (in 2024)
216	Akole (ST)	Ahmednagar	Kiran Lahamate	NCP	SS(UBT)
217	Sangamner	Ahmednagar	Amol Khatal	SHS	SS(UBT)
218	Shirdi	Ahmednagar	Radhakrishna Vikhe Patil	BJP	SHS
219	Kopargaon	Ahmednagar	Ashutosh Kale	NCP	SHS
220	Shrirampur (SC)	Ahmednagar	Hemant Ogle	INC	SHS
221	Nevasa	Ahmednagar	Vitthal Langhe	SHS	SHS

== Members of Parliament ==
Year	Name	Party
Before 2008 : See Kopargaon
2009	Bhausaheb Wakchaure	Shiv Sena
2014	Sadashiv Lokhande	Shiv Sena
2019	Sadashiv Lokhande	Shiv Sena
2024	Bhausaheb Wakchaure	Shiv Sena (Uddhav Balasaheb Thackeray)

== Election results ==
=== 2024 ===
2024 Indian general elections: Shirdi
Party	Candidate	Votes	%	±%
SS(UBT)	Bhausaheb Rajaram Wakchaure	476,900	45.00	New
SS	Sadashiv Lokhande	4,26,371	40.23	▼7.06
VBA	Utkarsha Rupwate	90,929	8.58	▲2.43
Independent	Bhausaheb Ramnath Wakchaure	14,006	1.32	N/A
BSP	Ramchandra Namdev Jadhav	7,040	0.66	N/A
Independent	Ravindra Kallayya Swamy	5,537	0.52	N/A
NOTA	None of the above	5,380	0.51	N/A
Majority		50,529	4.77	▼6.40
Turnout		10,60,418	63.12	▼1.81
SS(UBT) gain from SS		Swing		

=== 2019 ===
2019 Indian general elections: Shirdi
Party	Candidate	Votes	%	±%
SS	Sadashiv Lokhande	486,820	47.29	
INC	Bhausaheb Malhari Kamble	3,66,625	35.62	
VBA	Sanjay Laxman Sukhdan	63,287	6.15	
Independent	Pradip Sunil sarode	12,946	1.26	
CPI	Adv. Bansi Satpute	20,300	1.97	
Majority		1,20,195	11.67	
Turnout		10,30,502	64.93	
SS hold		Swing		

=== General election 2014 ===
2014 Indian general elections: Shirdi
Party	Candidate	Votes	%	±%
SS	Sadashiv Lokhande	532,936	57.14	+2.93
INC	Bhausaheb Rajaram Wakchaure	3,33,014	35.71	N/A
AAP	Nitin Udmale	11,580	1.24	N/A
BSP	Mahendra Dadasaheb Shinde	10,381	1.11	−0.16
BMP	Santosh Madhukar Roham	9,296	1.00	N/A
Margin of victory		1,99,922	21.43	+1.44
Turnout		9,32,893	63.80	+13.43
SS gain from INC		Swing		

=== General election 2009 ===
2009 Indian general elections: Shirdi
Party	Candidate	Votes	%	±%
SS	Bhausaheb Wakchaure	359,921	54.21	N/A
RPI(A)	Ramdas Athawale	2,27,170	34.22	N/A
Independent	Premanand Rupawate	22,787	3.43	N/A
BSP	Kacharu Nagu Waghmare	8,408	1.27	N/A
Margin of victory		1,32,751	19.99	N/A
Turnout		6,63,881	50.37	N/A
SS gain from RPI(A)		Swing		

== See also ==
- Kopargaon Lok Sabha constituency
- Ahmednagar district
- List of constituencies of the Lok Sabha
