= Madhukar Pichad =

Indian politician (1941–2024)

Madhukar Kashinath Pichad
- मधुकर काशिनाथ पिचड
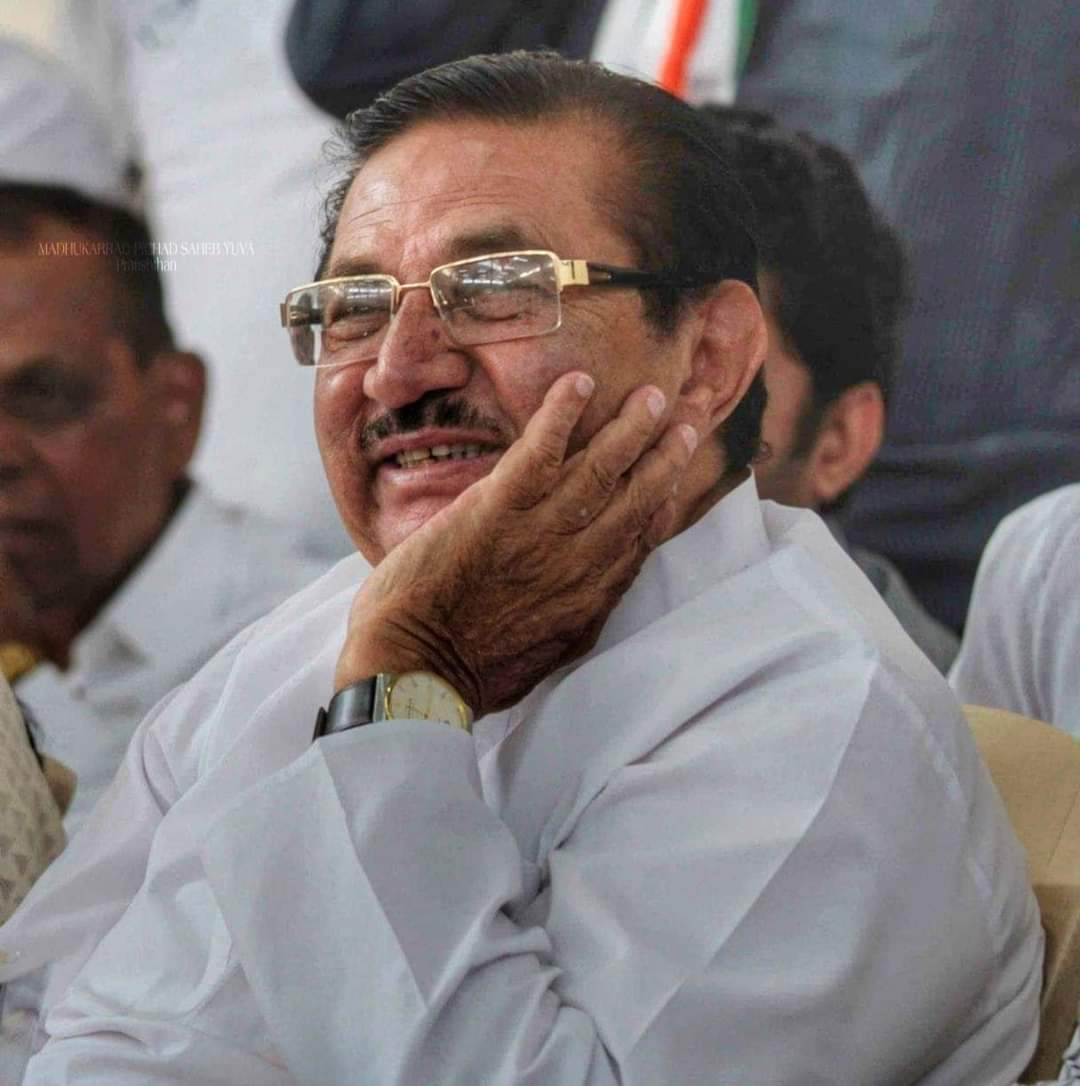

Member of the Maharashtra Legislative Assembly
- In office 1980–2014
- Preceded by: Yashwant S. Bhangare
- Succeeded by: Vaibhav Madhukar Pichad
- Constituency: Akole

15th Leader of Opposition Maharashtra Legislative Assembly
- In office 25 March 1995 – 15 July 1999
- Preceded by: Gopinath Munde
- Succeeded by: Narayan Rane

Personal details
- Born: 1 June 1941 Akole, Ahmednagar district, Bombay Province, British India
- Died: 6 December 2024 (aged 83)
- Party: Bharatiya Janata Party
- Other political affiliations: Indian National Congress (till 1999); Nationalist Congress Party (till 2019)
- Children: 3 (including Vaibhav Madhukar Pichad)
- Parent: Kashinath Bhikaji Pichad
- Occupation: Politician
- Nickname: Pichad Bhau

Madhukar Kashinath Pichad (1 June 1941 – 6 December 2024) was an Indian politician, social worker and cabinet minister in Government of Maharashtra. He served as the Member of the Maharashtra Legislative Assembly from the Akole Assembly constituency from 1980 to 2009. He was leader of opposition in the Maharashtra Legislative Assembly from March 1995 to July 1999.

Pichad was a member of Nationalist Congress Party since the inception of his political career but in 2019 he joined Bharatiya Janata Party along with his son Vaibhav Pichad. He served as the President of Nationalist Congress Party Maharashtra.

He founded Amrutsagar Milk Co-operative Akole in 1961. He was founding president of Agasti Sahakari Sugar Factory, the first cooperative sugar factory in India, founded in 1993.

== Life and career ==
Pichad was born on 1 June 1941 into a Tribal family of Mahadeo Koli to Kashinath Pichad, a Teacher and Kamalbai Kashinath Pichad, a housewife at Rajur, Ahmednagar district, Maharashtra.

He completed B. A. LLB from Ferguson College Pune, where he entered into the Students politics.

Pichad started his career on being elected as the Zila Parishad Member in 1972, and as the Chairman of Panchayat Samiti Akole Taluka in 1972, serving until 1980.

Pichad died on 6 December 2024, at the age of 83.

=== Positions held ===
- Elected as the Member of the Maharashtra Legislative Assembly from Akole Assembly constituency in 1980 Maharashtra Legislative Assembly election as a candidate of Indian National Congress (I) and served till 1985.
- Elected as the Member of the Maharashtra Legislative Assembly from Akole Assembly constituency for the second consecutive term in 1985 Maharashtra Legislative Assembly election as a candidate of Indian National Congress and served till 1990.
- Elected as the Member of the Maharashtra Legislative Assembly from Akole Assembly constituency for the third consecutive term in 1990 Maharashtra Legislative Assembly election as a candidate of Indian National Congress and served till 1995.
- Nominated as the Cabinet Minister for Ministry of Tribal Development on 25 June 1991 and served till 3 November 1992 in the Sudhakarrao Naik ministry.
- Nominated as the Cabinet Minister for Ministry of Tribal Development, Ministry of Dairy Development, Ministry of Travel Development and Ministry of Animal, Husbandry and Fisheries on 6 March 1993 and served till 14 March 1995 in the Fourth Pawar ministry.
- Elected as the Member of the Maharashtra Legislative Assembly from Akole Assembly constituency for the fourth consecutive term in 1995 Maharashtra Legislative Assembly election as a candidate of Indian National Congress and served till 2000.
- Nominated as the Cabinet Minister for Ministry of Tribal Development for the third term on 27 October 1999 and served till 16 January 2003 in the First Deshmukh ministry.
- Elected as the Member of the Maharashtra Legislative Assembly from Akole Assembly constituency for the fifth consecutive term in 1999 Maharashtra Legislative Assembly election as a candidate of Nationalist Congress Party and served till 2004.
- Elected as the Member of the Maharashtra Legislative Assembly from Akole Assembly constituency for the sixth consecutive term in 2004 Maharashtra Legislative Assembly election as a candidate of Nationalist Congress Party and served till 2009.
- Elected as the Member of the Maharashtra Legislative Assembly from Akole Assembly constituency for the seventh consecutive term in 2009 Maharashtra Legislative Assembly election as a candidate of Nationalist Congress Party and served till 2014.
- Nominated as the Cabinet Minister for Ministry of Tribal Development, Ministry of Tribal Development, Ministry of Nomadic Tribes and Other Backward Class Welfare on 11 June 2013 and served till 26 September 2014 in the Prithviraj Chavan ministry.
