= Bhausaheb Ubale =

Canadian human rights activist (1936–2012)

Bhausaheb Ubale, OOnt (b. 1936 in the Satara district, Maharashtra, India – d. 14 March 2012, Pune, India) was an Indian-born Canadian human rights activist.

== Education ==
Dr. Bhausaheb Ubale

Ubale received a Master of Arts degree in 1971 from the University of Leeds and a Ph.D. in 1975 from the University of Bradford.

== Work ==
From 1978 to 1985, he was a Commissioner on the Ontario Human Rights Commission. From 1986 to 1989, he was a Commissioner on the Canadian Human Rights Commission.

He is the author of Equal Opportunity and Public Policy (1978), a report submitted to the Attorney General of Ontario, and Politics of Exclusion: Multiculturalism or Ghettoism (1992, ISBN 0-9696103-0-0).

In 2001, he was awarded the Order of Ontario in recognition of his being "a renowned human rights activist whose work has made Ontario and Canada, a better place to live for people of all backgrounds".
