= Akole Assembly constituency =

Constituency of the Maharashtra legislative assembly in India

Coordinates: 19°32′32.06″N 74°0′19.88″E

Akole
- Constituency No. 216 for the Maharashtra Legislative Assembly

Constituency details
- Country: India
- Region: Western India
- State: Maharashtra
- District: Ahmednagar
- Lok Sabha constituency: Shirdi
- Established: 1962
- Total electors: 268,040
- Reservation: ST

Member of Legislative Assembly
- 15th Maharashtra Legislative Assembly
- Incumbent Kiran Lahamate
- Party: NCP
- Alliance: NDA
- Elected year: 2024

Akole Assembly constituency is one of the seats in Maharashtra Legislative Assembly in India. It is a segment of Shirdi Lok Sabha seat. The borders of Akole Assembly constituency were changed after the constituency map of India was redrawn in 2008.

== Overview ==
Akole (constituency number 216) is one of the twelve Vidhan Sabha constituencies located in the Ahmednagar district. It comprises part of Sangamner tehsil and the entire Akole tehsil of the district.

Akole is part of the Shirdi Lok Sabha constituency along with five other Vidhan Sabha segments in this district, namely Sangamner, Shirdi, Kopargaon, Shrirampur and Nevasa. It is reserved for the candidates belonging to the Scheduled tribes.

== Members of Vidhan Sabha ==
Year	Member	Party
1962	Yashawantrao Sakharam Bhangare	Indian National Congress
1967	Bapurao K. Deshmukh	Communist Party of India
1972	Yashawantrao Sakharam Bhangare	Indian National Congress
1978	Ashok Yashawantrao Bhangare	Indian National Congress
1980	Madhukar Pichad	Indian National Congress (I)
1985	Madhukar Pichad	Indian National Congress
1990	Madhukar Pichad	Indian National Congress
1995	Madhukar Pichad	Indian National Congress
1999	Madhukar Pichad	Nationalist Congress Party
2004	Madhukar Pichad	Nationalist Congress Party
2009	Madhukar Pichad	Nationalist Congress Party
2014	Vaibhav Madhukar Pichad	Nationalist Congress Party
2019	Dr. Kiran Lahamate	Nationalist Congress Party
2024	Dr. Kiran Lahamate	Nationalist Congress Party

== Election results ==
=== Assembly Election 2024 ===
2024 Maharashtra Legislative Assembly election : Akole
Party	Candidate	Votes	%	±%
NCP	Dr. Kiran Lahamate	73,958	38.36%	New
NCP-SP	Amit Ashok Bhangare	68,402	35.48%	New
Independent	Vaibhav Madhukar Pichad	32,783	17.00%	New
Independent	Maruti Deoram Mengal	10,830	5.62%	New
RSPS	Pathve Pandurang Nanasaheb	2,797	1.45%	New
NOTA	None of the Above	2,606	1.35%	▲0.02
Independent	Madhukar Shankar Talpade	1,747	0.91%	New
Independent	Vilas Dhondiba Ghode	1,457	0.76%	New
Margin of victory		5,556	2.88%	▼30.66
Turnout		195,413	72.90%	▲4.43
Total valid votes		192,807		
Registered electors		268,040		▲5.22
NCP gain from NCP		Swing	▼27.59	

=== Assembly Election 2019 ===
2019 Maharashtra Legislative Assembly election : Akole
Party	Candidate	Votes	%	±%
NCP	Dr. Kiran Lahamate	113,414	65.95%	▲23.38
BJP	Vaibhav Madhukar Pichad	55,725	32.40%	▲15.15
NOTA	None of the Above	2,298	1.34%	New
VBA	Dipak Yashwant Pathave	1,817	1.06%	New
Margin of victory		57,689	33.55%	▲20.93
Turnout		174,281	68.41%	▲0.80
Total valid votes		171,970		
Registered electors		254,749		▲6.85
NCP hold		Swing	▲23.38	

=== Assembly Election 2014 ===
2014 Maharashtra Legislative Assembly election : Akole
Party	Candidate	Votes	%	±%
NCP	Vaibhav Madhukar Pichad	67,696	42.57%	▼1.20
SS	Talpade Madhukar Shankar	47,634	29.95%	▼7.20
BJP	Ashok Yashwant Bhangare	27,446	17.26%	New
CPI(M)	Bhangre Namdev Ganga	11,861	7.46%	▲2.02
INC	Bhangare Satish Namdeo	4,391	2.76%	New
NOTA	None of the Above	2,051	1.29%	New
Margin of victory		20,062	12.62%	▲6.00
Turnout		161,301	67.65%	▲1.29
Total valid votes		159,028		
Registered electors		238,420		▲13.69
NCP hold		Swing	▼1.20	

=== Assembly Election 2009 ===
2009 Maharashtra Legislative Assembly election : Akole
Party	Candidate	Votes	%	±%
NCP	Madhukar Pichad	60,043	43.77%	New
SS	Talpade Madhukar Shankar	50,964	37.15%	New
Independent	Ashok Yashwant Bhangare	17,016	12.40%	New
CPI(M)	Katore Tulshiram Manga	7,455	5.43%	New
BSP	Barde Ahilaji Vithal	1,707	1.24%	▼1.03
Margin of victory		9,079	6.62%	▲0.89
Turnout		137,264	65.45%	▲7.73
Total valid votes		137,185		
Registered electors		209,714		▼8.01
NCP gain from BJP		Swing	▲7.21	

=== Assembly Election 2004 ===
2004 Maharashtra Legislative Assembly election : Akole
Party	Candidate	Votes	%	±%
BJP	Govardhan Mangilal Sharma	48,073	36.55%	▼9.73
INC	Khetan Ramakant Umashankar	40,545	30.83%	▼13.20
BBM	Balmukund Pandurangji Bhirad	18,252	13.88%	New
Independent	Alimchandani Harish Ratanlal	8,577	6.52%	New
SP	Ahmad Mukeem Ab. Rashid	7,932	6.03%	New
BSP	Patil Suresh Jagannath	2,985	2.27%	New
Independent	Azadkhan Aliyarkhan	1,616	1.23%	New
Margin of victory		7,528	5.72%	▲3.47
Turnout		131,532	57.70%	▲3.81
Total valid votes		131,514		
Registered electors		227,978		▲10.06
BJP hold		Swing	▼9.73	

=== Assembly Election 1999 ===
1999 Maharashtra Legislative Assembly election : Akole
Party	Candidate	Votes	%	±%
BJP	Govardhan Mangilal Sharma	51,646	46.28%	▼0.28
INC	Azhar Husain	49,131	44.02%	▲24.18
NCP	Arun Vishnuji Diwekar	7,708	6.91%	New
Independent	Mobinoor Rehman Qureshi	1,593	1.43%	New
Independent	Anil Devidas Garad	1,221	1.09%	New
Margin of victory		2,515	2.25%	▼24.46
Turnout		115,507	55.76%	▼12.90
Total valid votes		111,598		
Registered electors		207,147		▲8.03
BJP hold		Swing	▼0.28	

=== Assembly Election 1995 ===
1995 Maharashtra Legislative Assembly election : Akole
Party	Candidate	Votes	%	±%
BJP	Govardhan Mangilal Sharma	59,614	46.56%	New
INC	Arun Vishnuji Diwekar	25,412	19.85%	▼17.73
JD	Wali Mohmmad Abdul Aziz	15,913	12.43%	▲5.31
BBM	Patnaik Subhash Bhagawatprasad	12,127	9.47%	New
AIML	Adv. Quazi Mohammad Ali	8,761	6.84%	New
Independent	Ranjitsinh Gulabsing Chungade	2,197	1.72%	New
Margin of victory		34,202	26.71%	▲21.39
Turnout		130,084	67.84%	▲11.24
Total valid votes		128,034		
Registered electors		191,749		▲10.71
BJP gain from INC		Swing	▲8.98	

=== Assembly Election 1990 ===
1990 Maharashtra Legislative Assembly election : Akole
Party	Candidate	Votes	%	±%
INC	Arun Vishnuji Diwekar	36,146	37.58%	▼10.83
SS	Kelkar Deepak Kamlakar	31,023	32.25%	New
BRP	Patnaik Subash Bhagwat	13,982	14.54%	New
JD	Nanasaheb Choudhari	6,849	7.12%	New
Independent	Ramdas Shankarrao Gaikwad	2,647	2.75%	New
Independent	Aziz Ahmad Gulam Rasool	1,649	1.71%	New
Independent	Gadgil Chandrashekhar Shambhurao	1,581	1.64%	New
Margin of victory		5,123	5.33%	▼15.57
Turnout		97,212	56.13%	▼1.44
Total valid votes		96,186		
Registered electors		173,196		▲34.80
INC hold		Swing	▼10.83	

=== Assembly Election 1985 ===
1985 Maharashtra Legislative Assembly election : Akole
Party	Candidate	Votes	%	±%
INC	Gaikwad Ramdas Shankarrao	35,436	48.41%	New
Independent	Qazi Mohammed Ali Ibrahim Ali	20,138	27.51%	New
BJP	Pramila W/O Vishnu Tople	14,479	19.78%	▼14.48
Independent	Abdul Jabsar Abdul Raheman	1,213	1.66%	New
RPI	Mhesram Tukaram Maroti	1,212	1.66%	New
Margin of victory		15,298	20.90%	▲12.81
Turnout		73,847	57.48%	▼0.02
Total valid votes		73,203		
Registered electors		128,479		▲10.62
INC gain from INC(I)		Swing	▲6.07	

=== Assembly Election 1980 ===
1980 Maharashtra Legislative Assembly election : Akole
Party	Candidate	Votes	%	±%
INC(I)	Khan Mohammod Ajhar Hussein	28,027	42.34%	▼8.80
BJP	Tople Pramila W/O Asgar Husen	22,674	34.25%	New
AIML	Kaji Mohammadali Ibrahimali	6,494	9.81%	New
Independent	Sahare Devidas Sitaram	4,419	6.68%	New
Independent	Sawant Kashinath Tatyaba	1,391	2.10%	New
JP	Garge Dattatraya Ganesh	828	1.25%	▼31.85
INC(U)	Bhojane Shashikant Sambhaji	794	1.20%	New
Margin of victory		5,353	8.09%	▼9.95
Turnout		67,155	57.82%	▼9.31
Total valid votes		66,193		
Registered electors		116,140		▲6.86
INC(I) hold		Swing	▼8.80	

=== Assembly Election 1978 ===
1978 Maharashtra Legislative Assembly election : Akole
Party	Candidate	Votes	%	±%
INC(I)	Khan Mohammod Ajhar Hussein	36,853	51.14%	New
JP	Jain Pramila W/O Shripal	23,856	33.10%	New
INC	Goenkajamanlal Shriramji	6,832	9.48%	▼51.81
CPI	Utkhade Madhukarrao Narayanrao	1,283	1.78%	▼2.49
Independent	Mirza Unusbeg Mirza Hussainibeg	1,086	1.51%	New
Independent	Mishra Onkar Prasad Nand Gopal	996	1.38%	New
Independent	Rahate Dyandeo Zyngoji	610	0.85%	New
Margin of victory		12,997	18.03%	▼27.01
Turnout		74,100	68.18%	▲9.83
Total valid votes		72,067		
Registered electors		108,687		▲10.63
INC(I) gain from INC		Swing	▼10.15	

=== Assembly Election 1972 ===
1972 Maharashtra Legislative Assembly election : Akole
Party	Candidate	Votes	%	±%
INC	Jamanlal Shriramji Geonka	34,006	61.29%	▲13.43
RPI	Meshram Tokaram Maroti	9,013	16.24%	New
ABJS	W. Shankar Rao Deshmukh	8,528	15.37%	▼17.31
CPI	Sadashiv Mannu Pande	2,369	4.27%	New
AIFB	Shridhar Mukund Deo	1,162	2.09%	New
Margin of victory		24,993	45.04%	▲29.87
Turnout		59,742	60.81%	▼4.40
Total valid votes		55,486		
Registered electors		98,241		▲18.72
INC hold		Swing	▲13.43	

=== Assembly Election 1967 ===
1967 Maharashtra Legislative Assembly election : Akole
Party	Candidate	Votes	%	±%
INC	Jamanlal Shriramji Geonka	24,113	47.86%	▲3.27
ABJS	M. U. Lahane	16,466	32.68%	▲10.31
CPI(M)	B. J. Mukharjee	8,072	16.02%	New
Independent	P. R. Mahajan	1,382	2.74%	New
Margin of victory		7,647	15.18%	▼7.04
Turnout		53,687	64.88%	▼3.11
Total valid votes		50,381		
Registered electors		82,753		▲27.97
INC hold		Swing	▲3.27	

=== Assembly Election 1962 ===
1962 Maharashtra Legislative Assembly election : Akole
Party	Candidate	Votes	%	±%
INC	Madhusudhan Atmaram Vairale	18,452	44.59%	New
ABJS	Harihar Krishnarao Puradu Pandhya	9,258	22.37%	New
CPI	Bupendranath Jagdishchandra Mukarjee	8,980	21.70%	New
Independent	Balasa Vyankatsa Bharote	3,741	9.04%	New
Independent	Abbasali Manohali	747	1.81%	New
Margin of victory		9,194	22.22%	
Turnout		44,441	68.72%	
Total valid votes		41,382		
Registered electors		64,667		
INC win (new seat)				

== See also ==
- Akole
- List of constituencies of Maharashtra Legislative Assembly
