= Kiran Lahamate =

Indian politician from Maharashtra

Dr. Kiran Yamaji Lahamate
- डॉ किरण यमाजी लहामटे

Member Of Legislative Assembly of Maharashtra
- Incumbent
- Assumed office 21 October 2019
- Preceded by: Vaibhav Madhukar Pichad
- Constituency: Akole

Personal details
- Party: Nationalist Congress Party
- Profession: Politician, Doctor

Kiran Yamaji Lahamate is an Indian politician from Maharashtra. He was elected as Member of the Legislative Assembly from Akole Vidhan Sabha constituency reserved for Schedule Tribe in Ahmednagar. He received 112830 votes as a member of Nationalist Congress Party and defeated the Vaibhav Pichad of Bharatiya Janata Party.
