= Akole taluka =

- Tehsil
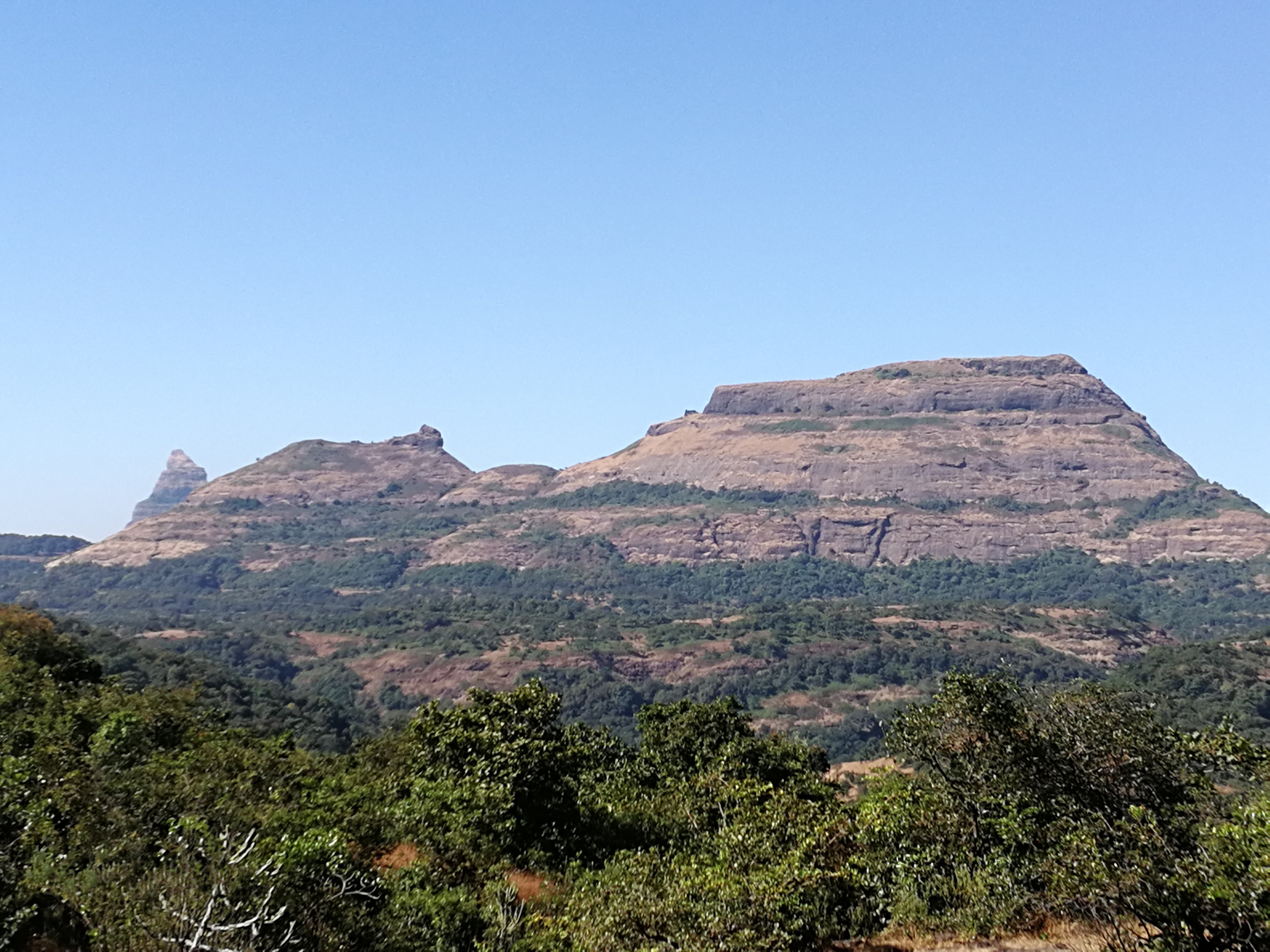
- Kalad Gadh

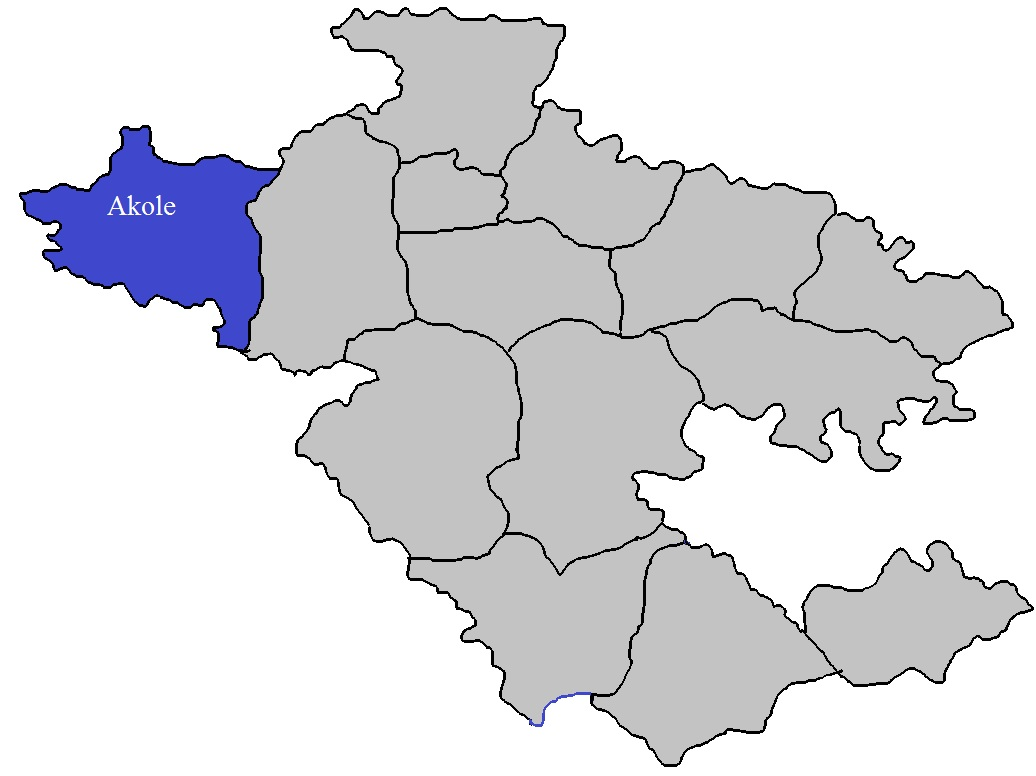
- Location of Akole in Ahmednagar district in Maharashtra
- Coordinates: 19°32′32.06″N 74°0′19.88″E
- Country: India
- State: Maharashtra
- District: Ahmednagar
- Headquarters: Akole

Government
  - Lok Sabha constituency: Shirdi (Lok Sabha constituency)
  - Assembly constituency: Akole (Vidhan Sabha constituency)
  - MLA: Dr. Kiran Yamaji Lahamate

Area
  - Total: 1,505.0 km^{2} (581.1 sq mi)

Population (2011)
  - Total: 291,950
  - Density: 193.99/km^{2} (502.42/sq mi)

Demographics
  - Literacy rate: 74.86%
  - Sex ratio: 974
- Rain: 1058 mm
- Website: www.akolemaza.com

Akole taluka is a taluka in Ahmednagar district in Maharashtra state of India. Akole consists of many places like Harishchandragad, Kalsubai, Bhandardara (Wilson) Dam, Sandhan Valley, Vishramgad etc. which attract tourists. Akole is not only famous for its natural scenery but, many historical events are also associated with it. The Western Akole is a part of Sahyadri ranges which increase its important.

== Area ==
The table below shows area of the taluka by land type.

Type of Land	Area (km^{2})	% of Total Area
Agriculture	987.12	65.59
Forest	416.98	27.7
Other	100.98	6.71
Total	1505.08	100

== Villages ==
There are around 191 villages in Akole taluka. For list of villages see Villages in Akole taluka.

== Demographics ==
Religions in Akole taluk (2011)
Religion	Percent
Hinduism	95.66%
Islam	2.39%
Buddhism	1.57%
Other or not stated	0.38%

Akole taluka has a population of 291,950 according to the 2011 census. Akole had a literacy rate of 74.86% and a sex ratio of 974 females per 1000 males. 10,046 (3.44%) lived in urban areas. Scheduled Castes and Scheduled Tribes make up 4.56% and 47.86% of the population respectively.

Languages of Akole taluk (2011)
1. Marathi (96.7%)
2. Hindi (2.02%)
3. Others (1.30%)

At the time of the 2011 Census of India, 96.68% of the population in the district spoke Marathi and 2.02% Hindi as their first language.

== Rain Fall ==
The table details rainfall from 1981 to 2004.

Year	Rainfall (mm)
1981	404
1982	396
1983	445
1984	374
1985	184
1986	244
1987	296
1988	734
1989	444
1990	503
1991	544
1992	404.5
1993	636.3
1994	509.8
1995	374
1996	620
1997	587
1998	814.5
1999	403
2000	439
2001	473
2002	445
2003	489
2004	1074

== Notable people ==
- Indurikar Maharaj - comedian kirtankar, and social educator

== See also ==
- Talukas in Ahmednagar district
- Villages in Akole taluka
