= Bhausaheb Rajaram Wakchaure =

Indian politician

Member of Parliament, Lok Sabha
- Incumbent
- Assumed office 4June 2024
- Preceded by: Sadashiv Lokhande
- Constituency: Shirdi

Personal details
- Born: 4 January 1950 (age 76) Akole, Ahmadanagar District, ( Maharashtra
- Party: Shiv Sena (June 2026-Present), (Till 2022)
- Other political affiliations: Shiv Sena(UBT) (2022-2026)
- Spouse: Saraswati Bhausaheb Wakchaure
- Children: 3
- Parent(s): Rajaram Govind Wakchaure, Godabai

Bhausaheb Rajaram Wakchaure is a member of the Lok Sabha of India. He represents Shirdi of Maharashtra and is a member of the Shiv sena (UBT) political party.
