= Hemant Ogale =

Indian politician

Member of the Maharashtra Legislative Assembly
- Incumbent
- Assumed office 2024
- Preceded by: Lahu Kanade
- Constituency: Shrirampur

Personal details
- Born: Ahmednagar, Maharashtra
- Party: Indian National Congress
- Parent: Bhujangrao Tukaram Ogale
- Profession: Politician

Hemant Bhujangrao Ogale is an Indian politician from Maharashtra. He is a member of the Maharashtra Legislative Assembly from 2024, representing Shrirampur Assembly constituency as a member of the Indian National Congress.

== See also ==
- List of chief ministers of Maharashtra
- Maharashtra Legislative Assembly
