= Sangamner =

- city
- Location in Maharashtra, India
- Coordinates: 19.57°N 74.22°E
- Country: India
- State: Maharashtra
- District: Ahmadnagar
- Elevation: 549 m (1,801 ft)

Population (2011)
  - Total: 65,804

Languages
  - Official: Marathi
- Time zone: UTC+5:30 (IST)
- PIN: 422605
- Telephone code: 02425
- Vehicle registration: MH 17
- Website: sangamnermc.gov.in

Sangamner is a city and a municipal council located in the Ahmednagar District (Ahilya Nagar) of Maharashtra state in India.

It derives its name from the site of the sangam (confluence) of three rivers in the area: the Pravara, Mhalungi, and Adhala.

Sangamner is one of the most developed and largest cities in the nearby area and is famous for its markets. It has become an industrial hub in recent years, with industry in the city including clothing, sugar, and tobacco factories. Its market is famous for clothes, jewellery and even electronics. The city is also a hub for milk-processing units and has one of the district's biggest marketplaces.

Sangamner has become an educational centre with numerous colleges and schools. Most of the colleges are affiliated with Pune University and have numerous libraries in the city itself. The city boasts good school education and has amazing facilities for higher education in law, medicine, engineering, pharmaceuticals, dentistry and etc.

The city enjoys a central location (at the centre of Mumbai, Pune, nashik and Aurangabad) & is only 2 hours from Nashik, 3 hrs from pune & 4 hrs from Mumbai.

== Geography ==
Sangamner is located at 19.57°N 74.22°E, on the banks of the Pravara River. It has an average elevation of 549 metres (1,801 ft)from mean sea level. Sangamner is the biggest settlement on NH 50 (New NH-60) between Pune (143 km distance) and Nashik (69 km distance). It is about 230 km from financial capital of India, Mumbai. On 15 August 2014, newly constructed by-pass was opened for traffic (9.5 km) which saves about 30.0 min of commute time. In recent years, the city outskirts has been developed tremendously. Kalsubai, the highest peak in Maharashtra is 68 km from Sangamner. It is the most developed city, largest marketplace (bazarpeth) in district after Ahmednagar city.

== Demographics ==
As of 2011 India census, Sangamner had a population of 65,804. Males constituted 51% of the population and females 49%. Sangamner has an average literacy rate of 90.86%, higher than the state average of 82.34%: male literacy is 94%, and female literacy is 87%.Current estimated population of Sangamner Municipal Council in 2026 is approximately 95,000.https://www.census2011.co.in/data/town/802822-sangamner-maharashtra.html
