= Pravara River =

Pravara
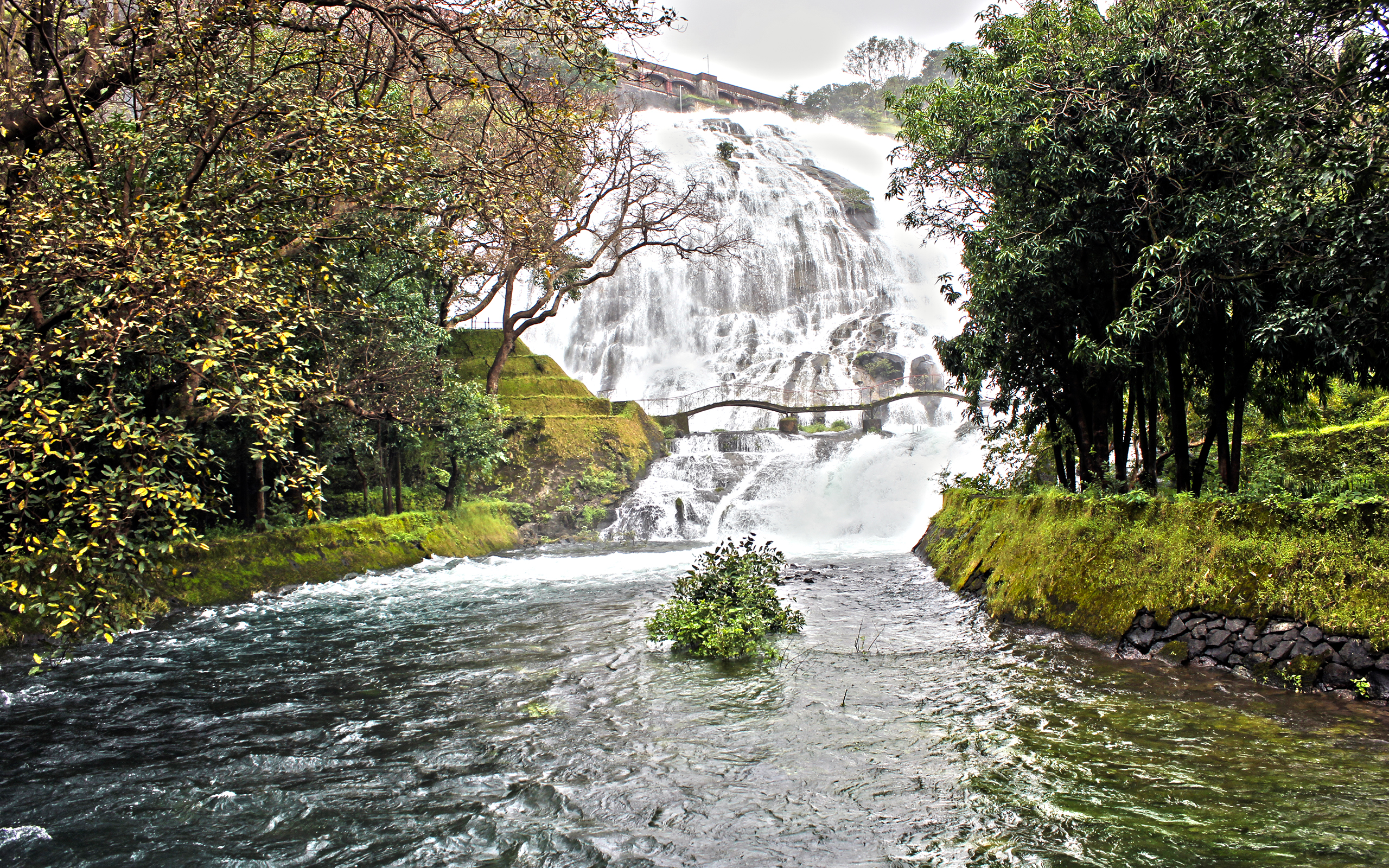
- Umbrella falls on Pravara river

Location
- Country: India
- State: Maharashtra
- District: Ahmednagar
- Cities: Sangamner, Nevasa

Physical characteristics
- Source: Sahayadris
  - location: Ahmednagar, Nahik Subdivision, Maharashtra, India
  - coordinates: 19°31′45″N 73°45′5″E
  - elevation: 750 m (2,460 ft)
- Mouth: Godavari River
  - location: Pravara Sangam, Ahmednagar, Nahik Subdivision, Maharashtra, India
  - coordinates: 19°37′00″N 75°01′00″E
  - elevation: 531 m (1,742 ft)
- Length: 208 km (129 mi)
- Basin size: 6,537 km^{2} (2,524 sq mi)

Basin features
- Tributaries
  - left: Waki, Mahalungi
  - right: Mula

The Pravara is the smallest of the major tributaries of Godavari river located in Maharashtra, India. Among the Godavari's 7 major tributaries, the Pravara is the only tributary which originates in the Western Ghats akin to the Godavari. Also, it is the only major tributary of Godavari to have both its source and confluence located within the same district - Ahmednagar.

== Etymology ==
As per Indian Vedas, Sage Agastya meditated by consuming only water and air for a long tenure. Due to his incredible devotion, Lord Shiva appeared, blessed him, and left a stream of Ganga that came to be known as the Pravara River.

== Origin ==
The Pravara rises on the eastern slopes of the Sahayadris between Kulang and Ratangad mountains in the Ahmednagar District of Maharashtra.

== Course ==
Close to its origin the river flows into the town of Bhandardara. Here, the Bhandardara Dam is constructed across the river forming the Arthur Lake. The gates of the dam are periodically opened, to allow drownstream flow of the Pravara, giving rise to the Umbrella Falls. From hereon the river takes an east ward course and 58 km downstream, reaches another city- Sangamner, where the river Mahalungi converges with it. This is the second largest city within the Ahmednagar District. Continuing eastwards, the river is joined by another tributary, this time on its right bank: River Mula. The river then, reaches the town of Nevasa and flows 12 km to the east where it finally empties itself into the Godavari River at Pravara Sangam located 208 km (129 mi) from its source of origin.

== Tributaries ==
In its short run, the river acquires water from two main tributaries : Mahalungi and Mula.

- Mahalungi : It rises on the southern and eastern slopes of Patta and Aundha. After the course of three miles (4.8 km), it passes east into the Sinnar taluka of Nashik. It reenters Ahmednagar, after taking a bend towards south, it ends at Sangamner, where it converges with Pravara at its left-bank.
- Mula : This river rises on the eastern slopes of the Sahayadris between Ratangad and Harichandragad. For the first twenty miles, it flows parallel to Pravara, draining the southernmost or Kotul valley of Akole taluka. Passing the town of Kotul it takes a bend to Baleshvar. It then crosses through Sangamner, Parner. The Dam Mula is constructed across the river at Baragaon Nandur. The river drains into Pravara just before the town Nevasa.
- Adhala : It originates in north of Akole on the Slopes of Patta and Mahakali. Merges with the Pravara 3 km (2 miles) west of Sangamner.

== Dams ==
- Bhandardara Dam
- Nilwande Dam
