= List of villages in Pathardi taluka =

In the 2001 census there were 137 villages in Pathardi tehsil of Ahmednagar district of state of Maharashtra. However the 2011 census only listed 134 villages. The list of village in Pathardi taluka:

== A ==
- Adgaon
- Agaskhand
- Aakola
- Alhanwadi
- Ambikanagar (Ambika Nagar)
- Aurangpur (Auranjpur)

== B ==
- Badewadi
- Bhalgaon
- Bharajwadi
- Bhawarwadi
- Bhilwade
- Bhose
- Bhutetakali
- Bondarwadi
- Borsewadi

== C ==
- Chekewadi
- Chichondi
- Chinchpur Ijade (Chinchpur Eejade)
- Chinchpur Pangul
- Chitali
- Chitalwadi
- Chumbhali

== D ==
- Dagadwadi
- Damalwadi
- Damalwadi
- Dangewadi
- Devrai
- Dhakanwadi
- Dhakanwadi
- Dhamangaon
- Dhangarwadi
- Dharwadi
- Dhawalewadi
- Dongarwadi
- Dulechandgaon

== E ==
- Ekanathwadi (Eknathwadi)

== G ==
- Ghaitadakwadi
- Ghatshiras
- Ghumatwadi
- Gitewadi

== H ==
- Hakewadi
- Hanuman Takali
- Hatra

== J ==
- Jambhali
- Jatdeole
- Jawakhede Dumala
- Jawakhede Khalsa
- Jawalwadi
- Jirewadi
- Jogewadi
- Joharwadi

== K ==
- Kadgaon
- Kalas Pimpri
- Kalegaon Fakir
- Kalewadi
- Kamat Shingave
- Karadwadi
- Karanji
- Karegaon
- Karodi
- Kasalwadi
- Kasar Pimpalgaon
- Kasarwadi
- Kaudgaon
- Kelwandi
- Khandgaon
- Kharwandi
- Kherde
- Kolhar
- Kolsangavi
- Kopare
- Koradgaon
- Kuttarwadi

== L ==
- Landakwadi
- Lohasar

== M ==
- Madhi
- Malegaon
- Malewadi
- Malibabhulgaon
- Mandave
- Manewadi
- Manik Daundi
- Midsangavi
- Miri
- Mohari
- Mohate
- Mohoj Bk.
- Mohoj Devadhe
- Mohoj Kh.
- Munguswade

== N ==
- Nandur Nimba Daitya (Nandur Nimbadaitya)
- Nimbodi
- Nipani Jalgaon
- Nivadunge (Nivdunge)

== P ==
- Padali
- Pagori Pimpalgaon
- Palavewadi
- Parewadi
- Pattryacha Tanda (Patryacha Tanda)
- Pimpalgaon Tappa
- Pimpalgavhan (Pimapalgavan)
- Pirewadi
- Prabhupimpri

== R ==
- Raghohivre
- Ranjani
- Renukaiwadi
- Rupnarwadi

== S ==
- Saidapur
- Sakegaon
- Sangavi Bk.
- Sangavi Kh.
- Satwad
- Shankarwadi
- Shekate
- Shindewadi
- Shingave Keshav
- Shiral
- Shirapur
- Shirasathwadi
- Somthane Bk.
- Somthane Kh.
- Somthane Nalwade
- Sonoshi
- Susare

== T ==
- Takali Manur
- Tinkhadi
- Tisgaon
- Tondoli
- Tribhuwanwadi

== V ==
- Vaiju Babhulgaon (Viajubabhulgaon)

== W ==
- Wadgaon (Vadgaon)
- Walunj
- Wasu

== Y ==
- Yeli

== See also ==
- Rahata tehsil
- Tehsils in Ahmednagar
- Villages in Akole tehsil
- Villages in Jamkhed tehsil
- Villages in Karjat tehsil
- Villages in Kopargaon tehsil
- Villages in Nagar tehsil
- Villages in Nevasa tehsil
- Villages in Parner tehsil
- Villages in Rahata taluka
- Villages in Rahuri tehsil
- Villages in Sangamner tehsil
- Villages in Shevgaon tehsil
- Villages in Shrigonda tehsil
- Villages in Shrirampur tehsil
