= Dadh budruk =

Village in Maharashtra

Dadh Budruk
- village
- Location in Maharashtra, India
- Coordinates: 19°31′28″N 74°25′09″E
- Country: India
- State: Maharashtra
- District: Ahmednagar
- Taluka: Rahata

Government
  - Type: Panchayati raj
  - Body: Grampanchayat

Population (2011)
  - Total: 7,622

Languages
  - Official: Marathi
- Time zone: UTC+5:30 (IST)
- PIN: 413714
- Telephone code: 02423
- Vehicle registration: MH-17

Dadh Budruk is a village in Rahata taluka of the Ahmednagar district in Maharashtra, India. The village is known for its temples, particularly Sant Mukund Das Maharaj Samadhi Temple on the Pravara river, and Shiv Temple. The village is 28 km from Shirdi, a town known as the home of Shri Sai Baba.

== Population ==
As per 2011 census, population of village is 7622, of which 3988 are males and 3634 are females.

== Economy ==
Main occupation of village resident is agriculture and allied works. The primary crops of the village are sugar cane, wheat and cotton.

== Transport ==
=== Road ===
Dadh budruk is connected to nearby villages Durgapur, Hasnapur, Dhanore and Chinchpur by village roads.

=== Rail ===
Shrirampur (Belapur) is the nearest railway station to a village.

=== Air ===
Shirdi Airport is the nearest airport to a village.

== See also ==
- List of villages in Rahata taluka
