= Shingave =

Village in Maharashtra

- village
- Location in Maharashtra, India
- Coordinates: 19°47′56″N 74°33′23″E
- Country: India
- State: Maharashtra
- District: Ahmednagar
- Taluka: Rahata

Government
  - Type: Panchayati raj
  - Body: Grampanchayat

Population (2011)
  - Total: 4,258
- Demonym: Shingavekar

Languages
  - Official: Marathi
- Time zone: UTC+5:30 (IST)
- PIN: 413708
- Telephone code: 02423
- Vehicle registration: MH-17
- Website: http://www.shingave-rahata.mahapanchayat.gov.in

Shingave is a village in Rahata taluka of Ahmednagar district in the Indian state of Maharashtra. It is one of the largest village by area in Rahata.

== Location ==
Shingave is situated on the bank of Godavari River in the northern region of Ahmednagar District and Rahata taluka.

Puntamba, Pimpalwadi, Sade, Rui and Wari are the nearby villages to Shingave. Shirdi, Rahata and Kopargaon are the nearby cities.

== Demographics ==
=== Population ===
The population of Shingave village is 4258 as of the 2011 census. Males constitute 2194 whereas females constitute 2064.

=== Literacy ===
Literacy rate of village is 67.52% which is below national and state average rates.

== Economy ==
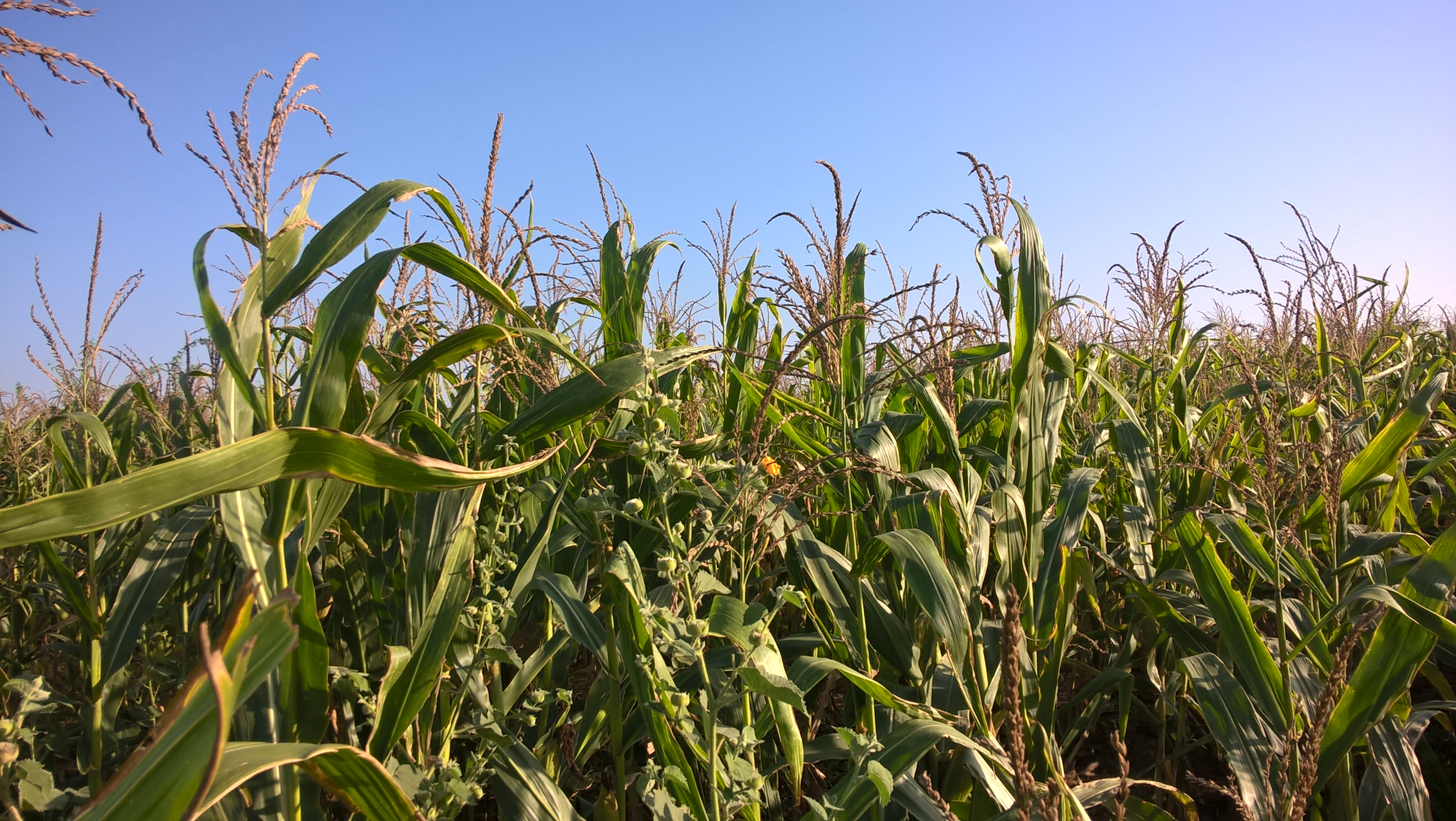
Maize Field in village

Agriculture is a backbone of a village. Most of the people are farmers who are engaged farming and allied work like Dairy farming, Goat farming. Many youths are employed in near city Shirdi. Some people are marginal workers.
Following table shows crops cultivated in village.

| Type | Crops |
|---|---|
| Kharif | Pearl millet, Sorghum, Maize, Soybean |
| Rabi | Wheat, Gram |
| Cash Crops | Sugarcane, Onion |

== Education ==
Shingave has three Zilla Parishad primary schools and one secondary school.

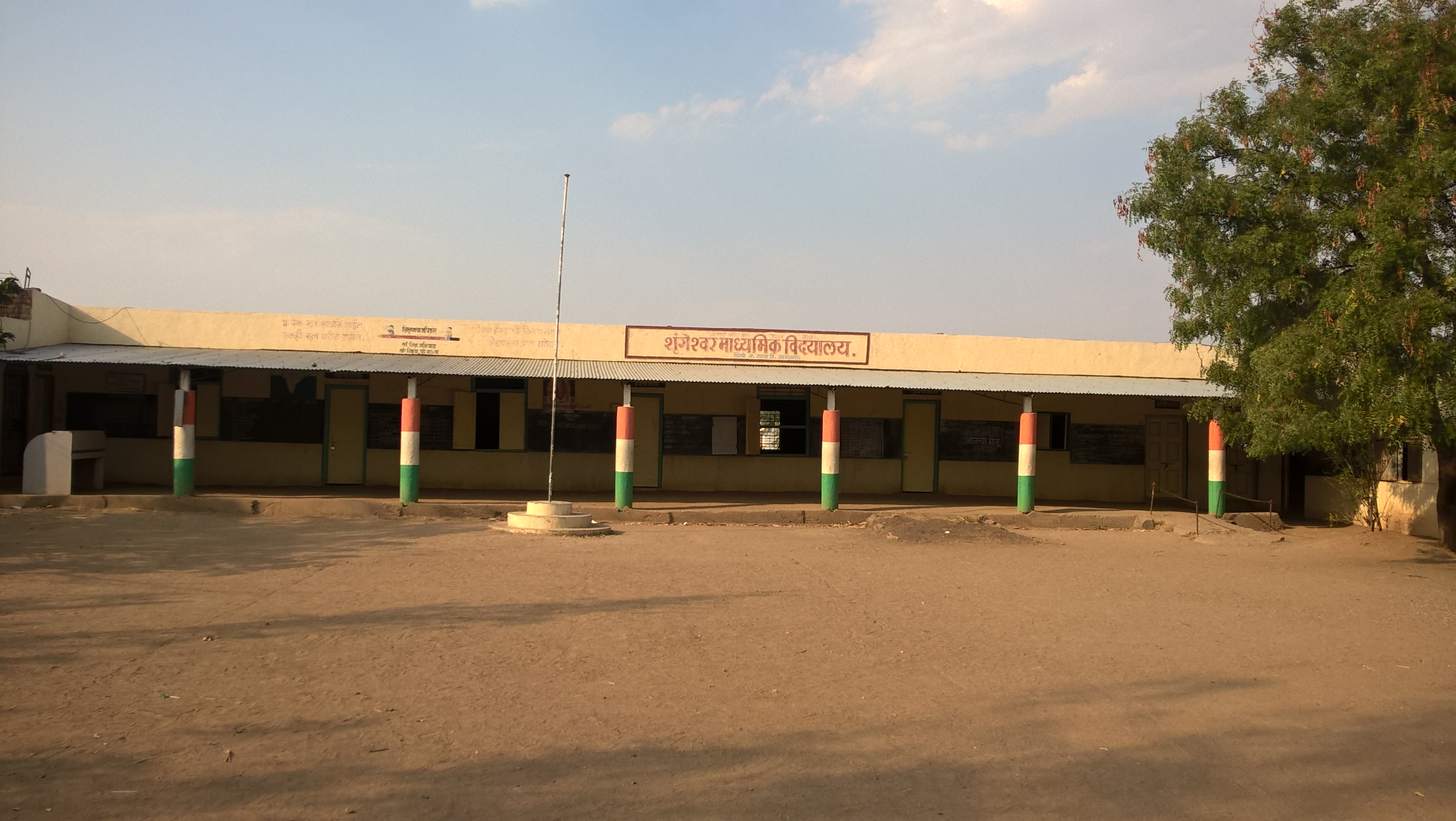
Shringeshwar Madhyamik Vidyalaya

- Primary schools
  - ZP School (Central location)
  - ZP School (West region)
  - ZP School (East region)
- Secondary school
  - Shringeshwar Madhyamik Vidyalaya

== Transport ==
=== Road ===
Shingave is connected to nearby cities and villages by state highway (SH 36) and other rural roads. State highway connects Shingave to Kopargaon, Puntamba and Shrirampur, rural roads to Pimpalwadi, Rui, Wari and Shirdi.

=== Rail ===
Shingave is served by nearby Shirdi, Puntamba and Kanhegaon railway stations.

=== Air ===
Shirdi Airport is the nearest airport to village at distance of 25 km.

== Gallery ==
Around Village

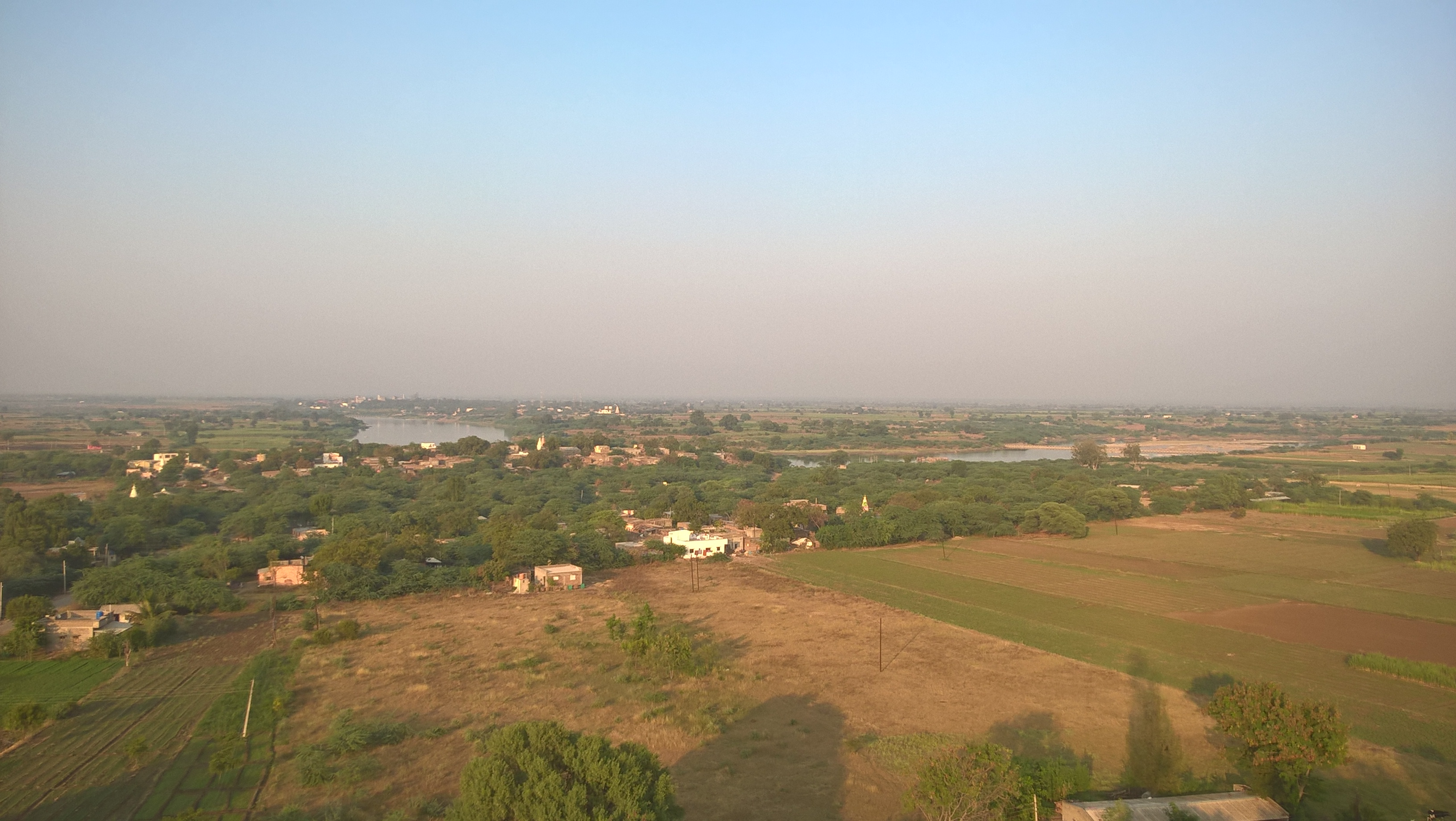
Aerial View of village

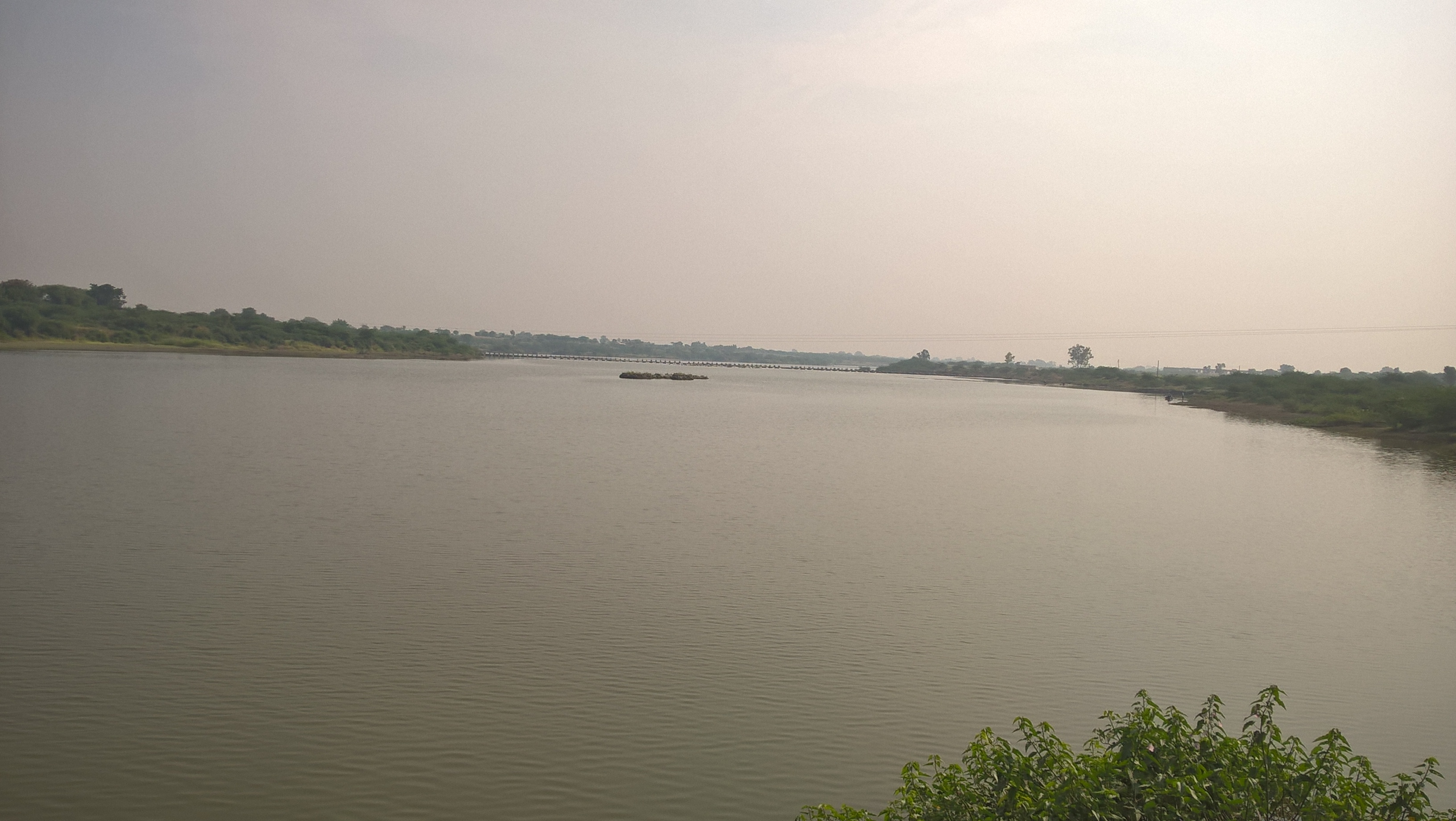
Godavari river as seen from the Maruti temple in village.

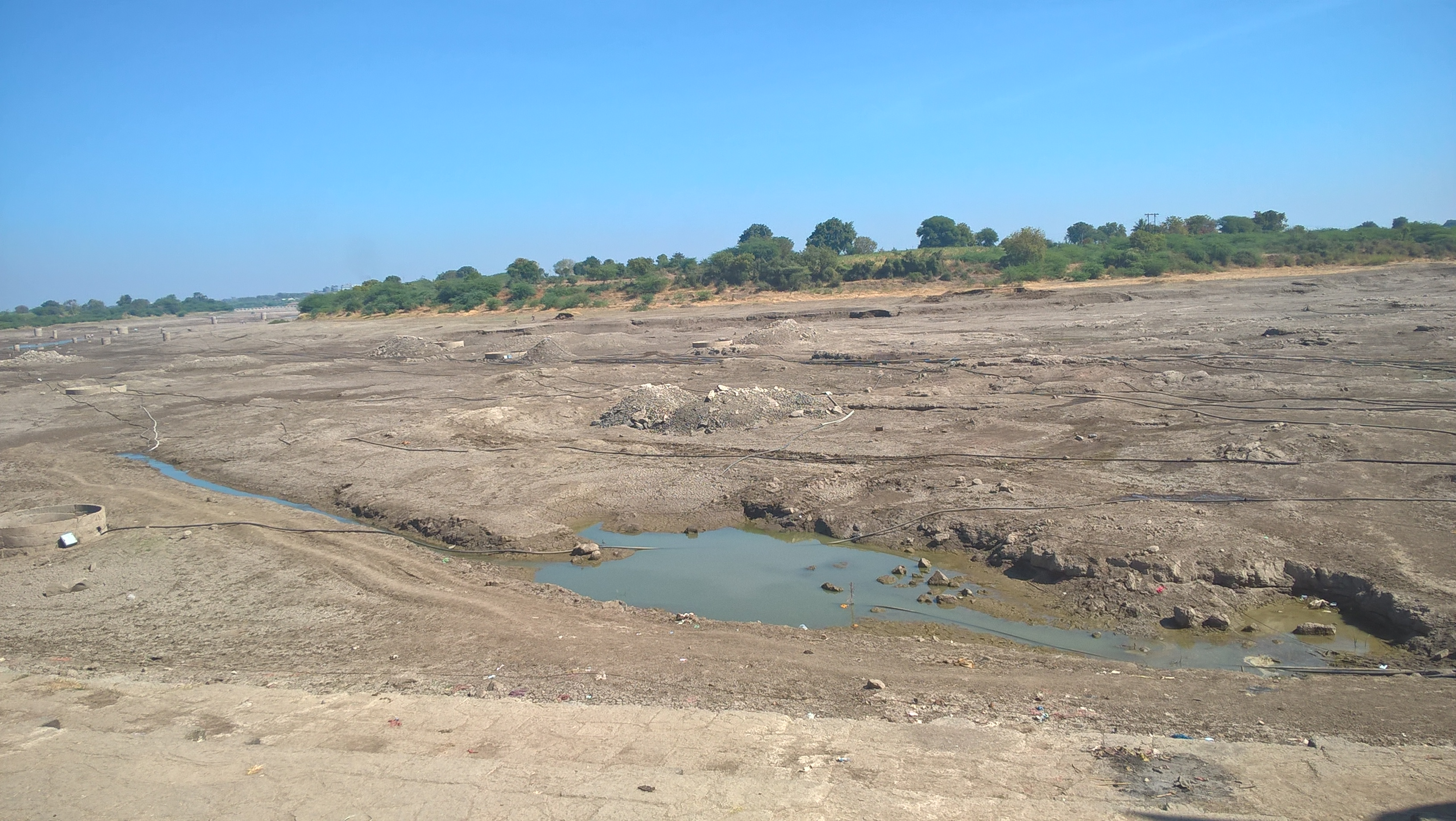
Dried river in February as seen from Ghat

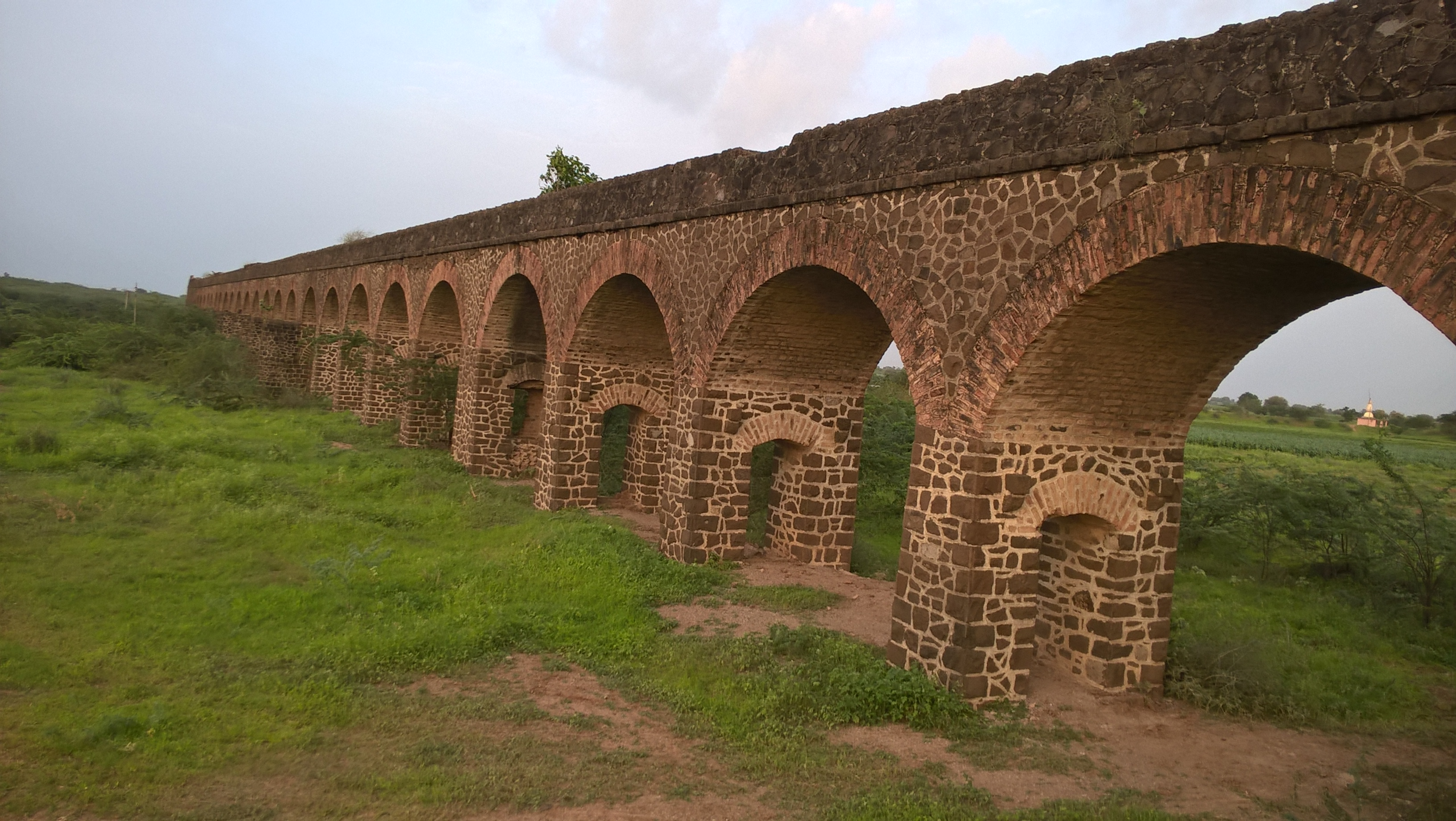
Abandoned Structure once used for Water Irrigation System

== See also ==
- List of villages in Rahata taluka
