= Pathare Budruk =

Village in Maharashtra

- village
- Location in Maharashtra, India
- Coordinates: 19°31′34″N 74°28′56″E
- Country: India
- State: Maharashtra
- District: Ahmednagar
- Taluka: Rahata

Government
  - Type: Panchayati raj
  - Body: Grampanchayat

Population (2011)
  - Total: 3,771

Languages
  - Official: Marathi
- Time zone: UTC+5:30 (IST)
- PIN: 413711
- Telephone code: 02423
- Vehicle registration: MH-17

Pathare Budruk is a village in Rahata taluka of Ahmednagar district in the Indian state of Maharashtra. It is located on banks of Pravara River.

== Population ==
As per 2011 census, population of village is 3,771, of which 1,931 are males and 1,840 are females.

== Economy ==
Primary occupation of village is agriculture and allied activities.

== Transport ==
=== Road ===
Nearby villages Bhagwatipur, Hanmantgaon and Loni Bk. are connected by rural roads.

=== Rail ===
Shrirampur railway station is the nearest railway station to a village.

=== Air ===
Shirdi Airport is the nearest airport to a village.

== See also ==
- List of villages in Rahata taluka
