= Ekrukhe =

Village in Maharashtra

- village
- Location in Maharashtra, India
- Coordinates: 19°42′24″N 74°32′31″E
- Country: India
- State: Maharashtra
- District: Ahmednagar
- Taluka: Rahata

Government
  - Type: Panchayati raj
  - Body: Grampanchayat

Population (2011)
  - Total: 5,311

Languages
  - Official: Marathi
- Time zone: UTC+5:30 (IST)
- PIN: 413719
- Telephone code: 02423
- Vehicle registration: MH-17

Ekrukhe is a village in Rahata taluka of Ahmednagar district in the Indian state of Maharashtra.

== Population ==
As of 2011 census, population of village is 5,311, of which 2,767 are males and 2,544 are females.

== Transport ==
=== Road ===
Shirdi - Shani Shingnapur state highway and Rahata - Chitali road passes thorough a village.

=== Rail ===
Chitali railway station is the nearest railway station to the village.

=== Air ===
Shirdi Airport is the nearest airport to village

== See also ==
- List of villages in Rahata taluka
