= Dorhale =

Village in Maharashtra

- village
- Location in Maharashtra, India
- Coordinates: 19°45′43″N 74°25′37″E
- Country: India
- State: Maharashtra
- District: Ahmednagar
- Taluka: Rahata

Government
  - Type: Panchayati raj
  - Body: Grampanchayat

Population (2011)
  - Total: 2,694

Languages
  - Official: Marathi
- Time zone: UTC+5:30 (IST)
- PIN: 423107
- Telephone code: 02423
- Vehicle registration: MH-17

Dorhale is a village in Rahata taluka of Ahmednagar district in the Indian state of Maharashtra.

== Population ==
As per 2011 census, population of village is 2694, of which 1380 are males and 1314 are females.

== Transport ==
=== Road ===
Dorhale is connected to nearby villages Pohegaon and Korhale by village roads.

=== Rail ===
Shirdi Railway Station is nearest railway station to a village.

=== Air ===
Shirdi Airport is the nearest airport to a village.

== See also ==
- List of villages in Rahata taluka
