= Dahigaon Korhale =

Village in Maharashtra

- village
- Location in Maharashtra, India
- Coordinates: 19°43′08″N 74°27′02″E
- Country: India
- State: Maharashtra
- District: Ahmednagar
- Taluka: Rahata

Government
  - Type: Panchayati raj
  - Body: Grampanchayat

Population (2011)
  - Total: 2,077

Languages
  - Official: Marathi
- Time zone: UTC+5:30 (IST)
- PIN: 423107
- Telephone code: 02423
- Vehicle registration: MH-17

Dahigaon Korhale is a village in Rahata taluka of Ahmednagar district in the Indian state of Maharashtra. It is located near Rahata city.

== Population ==
As per 2011 census, population of village is 2077, of which 1096 are males and 981 are females.

== Transport ==
=== Road ===
Dahigaon Korhale is connected to nearby villages by village roads. Ahmednagar-Manmad State highway passes near from village.

=== Rail ===
Shirdi Railway Station is nearest railway station to a village.

=== Air ===
Shirdi Airport is located at distance of 9 km from a village.

== See also ==
- List of villages in Rahata taluka
