= Ranjankhol =

Village in Maharashtra

- village
- Location in Maharashtra, India
- Coordinates: 19°37′38″N 74°36′58″E
- Country: India
- State: Maharashtra
- District: Ahmednagar
- Taluka: Rahata

Government
  - Type: Panchayati raj
  - Body: Grampanchayat

Population (2011)
  - Total: 5,070

Languages
  - Official: Marathi
- Time zone: UTC+5:30 (IST)
- PIN: 413720
- Telephone code: 02423
- Vehicle registration: MH-17

Ranjankhol is a village in Rahata taluka of Ahmednagar district in the Indian state of Maharashtra. It is located close to Shrirampur.

== Population ==
At the 2011 census, the population of the village was 5070, of which 2622 were males and 2448 were females.

== Economy ==
The main occupation of the village is agriculture. Industries are also located here as part of Shrirampur MIDC.

== Transport ==
=== Road ===
Shrirampur - Sangamner highway passes through the village.

=== Rail ===
Shrirampur railway station is the nearest railway station to the village.

=== Air ===
Shirdi Airport is the nearest airport to the village.

== See also ==
- List of villages in Rahata taluka
