= Agaskhand =

Village in Maharashtra

- Location in Maharashtra, India Agaskhand (India)
- Coordinates: 19.18°N 74.24°E
- Country: India
- State: Maharashtra
- District: Ahmadnagar

Population
  - Total: area_magnitude= sq. km

Languages
  - Official: Marathi
- Time zone: UTC+5:30 (IST)
- PIN: 414 106
- Telephone code: 02428
- Vehicle registration: MH-16
- Nearest city: Pathardi, Tisgaon, Dharwadi, chichondi, karanji.
- Lok Sabha constituency: Rahuri
- Civic agency: Grampanchayat
- Climate: Dry and hot (Köppen)
- Avg. summer temperature: 40 °C (104 °F)
- Avg. winter temperature: 15 °C (59 °F)

Agaskhand is a village in Pathardi taluka, Ahmadnagar district of Maharashtra state in Indian territory.

== Geography ==
Agaskhand has an average elevation of . The village is located on intersection of Pathardi.

== Education ==
- Jilha Parishad Primary School
- Highschool and Jr. college.
