= Rui (village) =

Village in Maharashtra

- village
- Location in Maharashtra, India
- Coordinates: 19°47′31″N 74°30′05″E
- Country: India
- State: Maharashtra
- District: Ahmednagar
- Taluka: Rahata

Government
  - Body: Grampanchayat

Population (2011)
  - Total: 5,211

Languages
  - Official: Marathi
- Time zone: UTC+5:30 (IST)
- PIN: 423109
- Telephone code: 02423
- Vehicle registration: MH-17

Rui is a village in Rahata taluka of Ahmednagar district in the state of Maharashtra of India. It is mentioned in ShriSaiSachcharitra, a holy book on Saibaba's life.

The village administration is governed by a body of panchayat, that is "Rui Grampanchayat", established on 2 February 1956.

Sandip Wable is now sarpanch, political head of office. He is the first sarpanch directly appointed by the people of village through general elections.

== Location ==
Rui is located near Shirdi city and sharing border with Pimpalwadi, Nighoj, Sawali Vihir Bk., Shingave and Kokamthan villages.

== Important places ==
- ShivSai mandir
- Gram Daivat Shri Hanuman temple
- Old Baarav behind Shivsai temple
- Shri datt mandir at Kohaki

== Demographics ==
Population of Rui is 5211. Males are 2696 and Females are 2515. Most of the population of village is agrarian, directly depend on agriculture and allied activities Large portion work at shirdi Such shop owners, job in shriSaiSansththan, some people work in ganesh cooperative sugar industry. Sugarcane, wheat, jawar, bajra, soyabean and guava fruit are the major crops of the village.

== See also ==
- List of villages in Rahata taluka
