= Pimpri Lokai =

Village in Maharashtra

- village
- Location in Maharashtra, India
- Coordinates: 19°40′39″N 74°23′41″E
- Country: India
- State: Maharashtra
- District: Ahmednagar
- Taluka: Rahata

Government
  - Type: Panchayati raj
  - Body: Grampanchayat

Population (2011)
  - Total: 1,297

Languages
  - Official: Marathi
- Time zone: UTC+5:30 (IST)
- PIN: 423107
- Telephone code: 02423
- Vehicle registration: MH-17

Pimpri Lokai is a village in Rahata taluka of Ahmednagar district in the Indian state of Maharashtra.

== Population ==
Population of village is 1,297 as of 2011 census. Out of total, 674 are males and 623 are females.

== Economy ==
Main occupation of village is agriculture.

== Transport ==
=== Road ===
Nearby villages Kakdi, Adgaon Khurd, Kelwad are connected by rural roads.

=== Rail ===
Sainagar Shirdi railway station is the nearest railway station to a village.

=== Air ===
Shirdi Airport is located near a village.

== See also ==
- List of villages in Rahata taluka
