= Pimplas, Ahmednagar =

Village in Maharashtra

Pimplas
- village
- Location in Maharashtra, India
- Coordinates: 19°42′10″N 74°28′16″E
- Country: India
- State: Maharashtra
- District: Ahmednagar
- Taluka: Rahata

Government
  - Type: Panchayati raj
  - Body: Grampanchayat

Population (2011)
  - Total: 3,577

Languages
  - Official: Marathi
- Time zone: UTC+5:30 (IST)
- PIN: 423107
- Telephone code: 02423
- Vehicle registration: MH-17

Pimplas is a village in Rahata taluka of Ahmednagar district in the Indian state of Maharashtra. It is located close to Rahata.

== Population ==
As per 2011 census, population of village is 3,577, of which 1,830 are males and 1,747 are females.

== Economy ==
Main occupation of village is agriculture and allied work.

== Transport ==
=== Road ===
Village is located near Nagar - Manmad highway. It is connected to nearby villages by rural roads.

=== Rail ===
Sainagar Shirdi railway station is the nearest railway station to a village.

=== Air ===
Shirdi Airport is the nearest airport to a village.

== See also ==
- List of villages in Rahata taluka
