= Mamdapur, Ahmednagar =

Village in Maharashtra

Mamdapur
- village
- Location in Maharashtra, India
- Coordinates: 19°36′36″N 74°33′23″E
- Country: India
- State: Maharashtra
- District: Ahmednagar
- Taluka: Rahata

Government
  - Type: Panchayati raj
  - Body: Grampanchayat

Population (2011)
  - Total: 5,782

Languages
  - Official: Marathi
- Time zone: UTC+5:30 (IST)
- PIN: 413737
- Telephone code: 02423
- Vehicle registration: MH-17

Mamdapur is a village in Rahata taluka of Ahmednagar district in the Indian state of Maharashtra.

== Population ==
As per the 2011 Census, the population of the village is 5,782; of which 3,038 are males and 2,744 are females.

== Economy ==
Agriculture is the main occupation of the village.

== Transport ==
=== Road ===
The Shrirampur-Sangamner highway passes through the village.

=== Rail ===
Shrirampur railway station is the nearest railway station to the village.

=== Air ===
Shirdi Airport is the nearest airport to the village.

== See also ==
- List of villages in Rahata taluka
