= Jalgaon, Ahmadnagar =

Jalgaon
- village
- Location in Maharashtra, India
- Coordinates: 19°42′25″N 74°36′56″E
- Country: India
- State: Maharashtra
- District: Ahmednagar
- Taluka: Rahata

Government
  - Body: Grampanchayat

Population (2011)
  - Total: 3,508

Languages
  - Official: Marathi
- Time zone: UTC+5:30 (IST)
- PIN: 413723
- Telephone code: 02423
- Vehicle registration: MH-17

Jalgaon is a village in Rahata taluka of Ahmednagar district in Indian state of Maharashtra.

== Demographics ==
As per the 2011 census, the population of Jalgaon is 3508, of which 1800 are males and 1708 are females.

== Transport ==
=== Road ===
Jalgaon is connected to Puntamba, Chitali and Wakadi by village road.

=== Rail ===
Chitali and Puntamba are the nearest railway station to the village.

=== Air ===
Shirdi Airport is nearest airport the village.

== See also ==
- List of villages in Rahata taluka
