= Rui =

Rui or RUI may refer to:

== Names ==
- Rui (given name), a given name of independent Portuguese origin

== Places ==
- Rui (state) (芮), a Chinese state during the Zhou Dynasty
- Rui (village), a census town in Kolhapur district, Maharashtra, India.
- Royal University of Ireland

== In fiction ==
- Rui, a character played by actor Luiz Fernando Guimarães in the popular Brazilian sitcom Os Normais and its spin-off films
- Rui (累), a character in the Japanese anime/manga series Demon Slayer: Kimetsu no Yaiba
- Ruy Blas, a tragic drama by Victor Hugo
- Rui Kamishiro, a character in the Japanese video game series Project Sekai
- Rui Yoshii (吉井るい), a minor character in the Japanese anime series Soaring Sky! Pretty Cure
- Hanazawa Rui, a character in the Japanese manga series Boys Over Flowers
- Ninomiya Rui, a character in the Japanese anime Gatchaman Crowds
- Yashio Rui, a character in the Japanese multimedia project BanG Dream!

== Species ==
- Rui fish, a common name for Labeo rohita
- Rui tree, a common name for Calotropis gigantea

== Other ==
- Radio Ukraine International, is a Ukrainian national worldwide radio broadcasting service
- Released under investigation, a form of police bail in England
- Russell 1000 Index, stock market index with trading symbol ^RUI

== See also ==
- Ruy (disambiguation)
