= Chandrapur, Ahmednagar =

Village in Maharashtra, India

Chandrapur
- village
- Location in Maharashtra, India
- Coordinates: 19°34′48″N 74°25′46″E
- Country: India
- State: Maharashtra
- District: Ahmednagar
- Taluka: Rahata

Government
  - Type: Panchayati raj
  - Body: Grampanchayat

Population (2011)
  - Total: 1,154

Languages
  - Official: Marathi
- Time zone: UTC+5:30 (IST)
- PIN: 413736
- Telephone code: 02423
- Vehicle registration: MH-17

Chandrapur, is a village in Rahata taluka of Ahmednagar district in the Indian state of Maharashtra. It is located in south-west part of Rahata taluka and borders with Sangamner taluka.

== Population ==
The population of Chandrapur village is 1154 as of the 2011 census. 598 are males and 556 are females.

== Economy ==
Most of the people are engaged in agriculture and some are working in market town Loni.

== Transport ==
=== Road ===
Loni-Sangamner Road passes from village which connects Sangamner, Loni and Shrirampur.

== See also ==
- List of villages in Rahata taluka
