= Tisgaon, Ahmednagar =

Village in Maharashtra

Tisgaon
- village
- Location in Maharashtra, India
- Coordinates: 19°34′24″N 74°31′47″E
- Country: India
- State: Maharashtra
- District: Ahmednagar
- Taluka: Rahata

Government
  - Type: Panchayati raj
  - Body: Grampanchayat

Population (2011)
  - Total: 2,138

Languages
  - Official: Marathi
- Time zone: UTC+5:30 (IST)
- PIN: 413712
- Telephone code: 414106
- Vehicle registration: MH-16
- Website: http://www.tisgaon-rahata.mahapanchayat.gov.in

Tisgaon is a village in Rahata taluka of Ahmednagar district in the Indian state of Maharashtra. The village derives its name from the historical 30 Gates which were built in early 16th century by Ahmednagar Sultanate.

== Population ==
As per 2011 census, population of village is 2,138, of which 1,096 are male and 1,042 are female.

== Economy ==
Main occupation of village is agriculture and allied work.

== Transport ==
=== Road ===
Village is located near Nagar - Manmad highway. It is connected to nearby villages by village roads.

=== Rail ===
Shrirampur railway station is the nearest railway station to a village.

=== Air ===
Shirdi Airport is the nearest airport to a village.

== See also ==
- List of villages in Rahata taluka
