= Pimpri Nirmal =

Village in Maharashtra

- village
- Location in Maharashtra, India
- Coordinates: 19°38′25″N 74°29′22″E
- Country: India
- State: Maharashtra
- District: Ahmednagar
- Taluka: Rahata

Government
  - Type: Panchayati raj
  - Body: Grampanchayat

Population (2011)
  - Total: 5,958

Languages
  - Official: Marathi
- Time zone: UTC+5:30 (IST)
- PIN: 423107
- Telephone code: 02423
- Vehicle registration: MH-17

Pimpri Nirmal is a village in Rahata taluka of Ahmednagar district in the Indian state of Maharashtra. Literacy rate is almost 100 percent.

== Population ==
As per 2011 census, population of village is 5,958, of which 3,102 are males and 2,856 are females.

== Economy ==
Primary occupation of village is agriculture and allied work. From last few years Pomegranate and grapes are the main farming and cultivation in large area. Good water management example is implemented in this village. Every farmer in this village those have either Pomegranate and grapes farming have its own water tank in the farm . In the summer this water is used for farming.

== Transport ==
=== Road ===
Nagar - Manmad highway passes through a village. Nearby villages are connected by this road. Starting point of Shirdi by pass road is from the village from nagar side. Shirdi bypass can be used to reach to Shirdi Airport from Village.

=== Rail ===
Sainagar Shirdi railway station is the nearest railway station to a village(15km). Even Shrirampur(Belapur) is 22 km away from Pimpari Nirmal and also connected with railway.

=== Air ===
Shirdi Airport is the nearest airport to a village.

== See also ==
- List of villages in Rahata taluka
