= Jalgaon (disambiguation) =

Jalgaon is a city in western India. It may also refer to:

- The census town of Jalgaon, Ratnagiri, in Ratnagiri district of Maharashtra.
- A tehsil Jalgaon Jamod in Buldhana district of Maharashtra.
- A village in Niphad Talulka in Nashik district of Maharashtra.
- A Jalgaon village in Rahata taluka of Ahmednagar district in Maharashtra
