= Durgapur, Ahmednagar =

Village in Maharashtra

Durgapur
- village
- Location in Maharashtra, India
- Coordinates: 19°32′31″N 74°26′30″E
- Country: India
- State: Maharashtra
- District: Ahmednagar
- Taluka: Rahata

Government
  - Type: Panchayati raj
  - Body: Grampanchayat

Population (2011)
  - Total: 2,641

Languages
  - Official: Marathi
- Time zone: UTC+5:30 (IST)
- PIN: 413736
- Telephone code: 02423
- Vehicle registration: MH-17

Durgapur is a village in Rahata taluka of Ahmednagar district in the Indian state of Maharashtra. It is located in southern part of Rahata taluka.

== Population ==
As of 2011 census, Population of village is 2641, of which 1384 are males and 1257 are females.

== Transport ==
=== Road ===
Durgapur is connected to nearby villages Hasnapur, Dadh Bk. and Chinchpur by village roads.

=== Rail ===
Shrirampur (Belapur) Railway Station is nearest railway station to a village.

=== Air ===
Shirdi Airport is the nearest airport to a village.

== See also ==
- List of villages in Rahata taluka
