= Wakadi =

Village in Maharashtra

- village
- Location in Maharashtra, India
- Coordinates: 19°40′44″N 74°34′46″E
- Country: India
- State: Maharashtra
- District: Ahmednagar
- Taluka: Rahata

Government
  - Body: Grampanchayat

Population (2011)
  - Total: 11,930

Languages
  - Official: Marathi
- Time zone: UTC+5:30 (IST)
- PIN: 413719
- Telephone code: 02423
- Vehicle registration: MH-17

Wakadi is a village in Rahata taluka of Ahmednagar district in Indian state of Maharashtra. It has a temple dedicated to the Hindu deity Khandoba.It has a higher secondary school named 'shri Laxmi Narayan vidyalay' located in mid of town.

== Demographics ==
The 2011 Census of India recorded the population of Wakadi as being 11,930, of which 6.185 were males.

== Transport ==
=== Road ===
Wakadi is connected to Shirdi and Shrirampur by Shirdi-Shingnapur state highway.

=== Rail ===
Chitali station is the nearest railway station to village.

=== Air ===
Shirdi Airport is nearest airport to village at distance of 27 km.

== See also ==
- List of villages in Rahata taluka
