= Rajuri, Ahmednagar =

Village in Maharashtra

Rajuri
- village
- Location in Maharashtra, India
- Coordinates: 19°36′59″N 74°32′27″E
- Country: India
- State: Maharashtra
- District: Ahmednagar
- Taluka: Rahata

Government
  - Type: Panchayati raj
  - Body: Grampanchayat

Population (2011)
  - Total: 4,298

Languages
  - Official: Marathi
- Time zone: UTC+5:30 (IST)
- PIN: 413737
- Telephone code: 02423
- Vehicle registration: MH-17
- Website: http://www.rajuri-rahata.mahapanchayat.gov.in/

Rajuri is a village in Rahata taluka of Ahmednagar district in the Indian state of Maharashtra.

== Population ==
Population of village is 4,298 as of 2011 census, Out of total, 2,215 are males and 2,083 are females.

== Economy ==
Primary occupation of village is agriculture and allied work.

== Transport ==
=== Road ===
Village is located near Nagar - Manmad and Shrirampur - Sangamner highways.

=== Rail ===
Shrirampur railway station is the nearest railway station to a village.

=== Air ===
Shirdi Airport is the nearest airport to a village.

== See also ==
- List of villages in Rahata taluka
