= Chitali =

- village
- Location in Maharashtra, India
- Coordinates: 19°41′22″N 74°37′15″E
- Country: India
- State: Maharashtra
- District: Ahmednagar
- Taluka: Rahata

Government
  - Body: Grampanchayat

Population (2011)
  - Total: 4,609

Languages
  - Official: Marathi
- Time zone: UTC+5:30 (IST)
- PIN: 413723
- Telephone code: 02423
- Vehicle registration: MH-17
- Website: http://www.chitali-rahata.mahapanchayat.gov.in

Chitali, is a village in Rahata taluka of Ahmednagar district in Indian state of Maharashtra.

== Location ==
Chitali is located to the eastern part of Rahata taluka and shares border with Shrirampur taluka. Wakadi, Jalgaon, Nimgaon Khairi are the nearby villages.

== Demographics ==
As per 2011 census, population of Chitali is 4609. Male constitute 2415 and female constitute 2194. Literacy rate of village is 72%.

== Economy ==
Agriculture and allied works are the main occupation of village. John Distilleries has manufacturing unit in Chitali village.

== Transport ==
=== Road ===
Chitali is connected to Rahata and Nimgaon Khairi by district road.

=== Rail ===
Chitali station is located within village limit.

=== Air ===
Shirdi Airport is nearest airport to the village.

== See also ==
- List of villages in Rahata taluka
