= Sawali Vihir Khurd =

Village in Maharashtra

- village
- Location in Maharashtra, India
- Coordinates: 19°49′17″N 74°26′59″E
- Country: India
- State: Maharashtra
- District: Ahmednagar
- Taluka: Rahata

Government
  - Body: Grampanchayat

Population (2011)
  - Total: 3,757

Languages
  - Official: Marathi
- Time zone: UTC+5:30 (IST)
- PIN: 423109
- Telephone code: 02423
- Vehicle registration: MH-17

Sawali Vihir Khurd is a village in Rahata taluka of Ahmednagar district in the state of Maharashtra of India.

== Location ==
Sawali Vihir Kh. situated on north border of Rahata taluka and share border with Sawali Vihir Bk, Chande Kasare and Jeur Kumbhari villages.

== Demographics ==
Population of Sawali Vihir Kh. is 3757. Males are 1920 whereas females are 1837.

== See also ==
- List of villages in Rahata taluka
