= Adgaon Budruk =

Village in Maharashtra, India

- village
- Location in Maharashtra, India
- Coordinates: 19°39′04″N 74°25′59″E
- Country: India
- State: Maharashtra
- District: Ahmednagar
- Taluka: Rahata

Government
  - Type: Panchayati raj
  - Body: Grampanchayat

Population (2011)
  - Total: 2,428

Languages
  - Official: Marathi
- Time zone: UTC+5:30 (IST)
- PIN: 423107
- Telephone code: 02423
- Vehicle registration: MH-17

Adgaon Budruk is a village in Rahata taluka of Ahmednagar district in the Indian state of Maharashtra.

== Population ==
As per 2011 census, population of village is 2428, of which 1256 are males and 1172 are females.

== Transport ==
=== Road ===
Adgaon Budruk is well connected to nearby villages by village roads.

=== Rail ===
Shirdi is nearest railway station to village.

=== Air ===
Shirdi Airport is the nearest airport to village.

== See also ==
- List of villages in Rahata taluka
