= Aakola =

Village in Maharashtra, India

- Location in Maharashtra, India Aakola (India)
- Coordinates: 19.18°N 74.24°E
- Country: India
- State: Maharashtra
- District: Ahmadnagar

Languages
  - Official: Marathi
- Time zone: UTC+5:30 (IST)
- PIN: 414102
- Telephone code: 02428
- Vehicle registration: MH-16
- Nearest city: Pathardi, Tisgaon, Dharwadi, Chichondi, Karanji
- Lok Sabha constituency: Rahuri
- Civic agency: Grampanchayat
- Climate: Dry and hot (Köppen)
- Avg. summer temperature: 40 °C (104 °F)
- Avg. winter temperature: 15 °C (59 °F)

Aakola is a village in Pathardi taluka, Ahmadnagar district of Maharashtra, India.
