= Akola (disambiguation) =

Akola may refer to:

- Akola, a city in the state of Maharashtra, India
  - Akola district, a district of the state of Maharashtra, India
  - Akola (Lok Sabha constituency), a Lok Sabha constituency of Maharashtra, India
  - Akola Airport
  - Akola Fort
- Akola, Agra, a town in Uttar Pradesh, India
- Akola, Chittorgarh, a village in Rajasthan, India
- Aakola or Akola, a village in Pathardi taluka, Maharashtra, India
