= Khadkewake =

Village in Maharashtra

- village
- Location in Maharashtra, India
- Coordinates: 19°40′04″N 74°27′07″E
- Country: India
- State: Maharashtra
- District: Ahmednagar
- Taluka: Rahata

Government
  - Type: Panchayati raj
  - Body: Grampanchayat

Population (2011)
  - Total: 1,982

Languages
  - Official: Marathi
- Time zone: UTC+5:30 (IST)
- PIN: 423107
- Telephone code: 02423
- Vehicle registration: MH-17

Khadkewake is a village in Rahata taluka of Ahmednagar district in the Indian state of Maharashtra.

== Population ==
According to the 2011 census, the population of the village is 1982, comprising 1,060 male residents and 922 female residents.

== Economy ==
Most of the village residents are engaged in agriculture. A Export Facility Center of Maharashtra State Agricultural Marketing Board for fruits and vegetables is located in the village.

== Transport ==
=== Road ===
Khadkewake is connected to nearby cities and villages by village roads and the Nagar-Manmad highway.

=== Rail ===
Shirdi is the nearest railway station to village.

=== Air ===
Shirdi Airport is the nearest airport to village.

== See also ==
- List of villages in Rahata taluka
