= Korhale =

Village in Maharashtra

- village
- Location in Maharashtra, India
- Coordinates: 19°43′26″N 74°25′13″E
- Country: India
- State: Maharashtra
- District: Ahmednagar
- Taluka: Rahata

Government
  - Type: Panchayati raj
  - Body: Grampanchayat

Population (2011)
  - Total: 4,798

Languages
  - Official: Marathi
- Time zone: UTC+5:30 (IST)
- PIN: 423107
- Telephone code: 02423
- Vehicle registration: MH-17

Korhale is a village in Rahata taluka of Ahmednagar district in the Indian state of Maharashtra. It is located in the north-west region of Rahata taluka.

The village is likely known for its historical purpose. During the age of British Empire and in the holkars empire the village is so called Subha. It means the whole agricultural tax and other types of taxes are gathered here. Some people think that the name Rahata appears to Rahata city due to visitors from puntamba to korhale or vice versa are stayed in this location so it has named Rahata.

== Population ==
As per 2011 census, population of village is 4,798, of which 2,484 are male and 2,314 are female.

== Economy ==
Agriculture and allied work is the main occupation of village.

== Transport ==
=== Road ===
Shirdi Airport road passes through Korhale which connects to Shirdi. Nearby villages are connected to Korhale by village roads.

=== Rail ===
Shirdi is nearest railway station to village.

=== Air ===
Shirdi Airport is located near the village.

== See also ==
- List of villages in Rahata taluka
