= Walki, Ahmednagar =

Village in Maharashtra

Walki
- village
- Location in Maharashtra, India
- Coordinates: 19°45′48″N 74°23′37″E
- Country: India
- State: Maharashtra
- District: Ahmednagar
- Taluka: Rahata

Government
  - Type: Panchayati raj
  - Body: Grampanchayat

Population (2011)
  - Total: 1,062

Languages
  - Official: Marathi
- Time zone: UTC+5:30 (IST)
- PIN: 423605
- Telephone code: 02423
- Vehicle registration: MH-17

Walki is a village in Rahata taluka of Ahmednagar district in the Indian state of Maharashtra.

== Population ==
As per 2011 census, population of village is 8,203. 4,329 are male and 3,874 are female.

== Economy ==
Main occupation of village is agriculture and allied work.

== Transport ==
=== Road ===
Walki is connected to nearby cities and villages by village roads.

=== Rail ===
Shirdi is nearest railway station to village.

=== Air ===
Shirdi Airport is the nearest airport to village.

== See also ==
- List of villages in Rahata taluka
