= Ranjangaon Khurd =

Village in Maharashtra

- village
- Location in Maharashtra, India
- Coordinates: 19°41′10″N 74°32′11″E
- Country: India
- State: Maharashtra
- District: Ahmednagar
- Taluka: Rahata

Government
  - Type: Panchayati raj
  - Body: Grampanchayat

Population (2011)
  - Total: 4,783

Languages
  - Official: Marathi
- Time zone: UTC+5:30 (IST)
- PIN: 413719
- Telephone code: 02423
- Vehicle registration: MH-17

Ranjangaon Khurd is a village in Rahata taluka of Ahmednagar district in the Indian state of Maharashtra.

== Population ==
As per 2011 census, population of village is 4,783, of which 2,507 are males and 2,276 are females.

== Economy ==
Main occupation of village is agriculture and allied work. Pd. Dr. Vitthalrao Vikhe Patil S.S.K. Ltd. (Shree Ganesh Unit), a sugar factory is located near a village.

== Transport ==
=== Road ===
Village is located near Shirdi - Shani Shingnapur highway.

=== Rail ===
Chitali railway station is the nearest railway station to a village.

=== Air ===
Shirdi Airport is the nearest airport to a village.

== See also ==
- List of villages in Rahata taluka
