= Bhagwatipur, Ahmednagar =

Village in Maharashtra

Bhagwatipur
- village
- Location in Maharashtra, India
- Coordinates: 19°33′30″N 74°30′46″E
- Country: India
- State: Maharashtra
- District: Ahmednagar
- Taluka: Rahata

Government
  - Type: Panchayati raj
  - Body: Grampanchayat

Population (2011)
  - Total: 7,403

Languages
  - Official: Marathi
- Time zone: UTC+5:30 (IST)
- PIN: 413712
- Telephone code: 02423
- Vehicle registration: MH-17

Bhagwatipur is a village in Rahata taluka of Ahmednagar district in the Indian state of Maharashtra.

== Population ==
As per, 2011 census of India population of village is 7403. 3765 of them are male and 3638 are females.

== Economy ==
Agriculture and allied work is main occupation. The temple of Bhagwati Devi after which the village is named is center of pilgrim's attention.

== Transport ==
=== Road ===
Bhagwatipur is connected to nearby cities Nagar - Manmad highway and villages by village roads.

=== Rail ===
Shrirampur railway station is nearest railway station.

=== Air ===
Shirdi Airport is the nearest airport.

== See also ==
- List of villages in Rahata taluka
