= Gogalgaon =

Village in Maharashtra

- village
- Location in Maharashtra, India
- Coordinates: 19°36′33″N 74°25′54″E
- Country: India
- State: Maharashtra
- District: Ahmednagar
- Taluka: Rahata

Government
  - Type: Panchayati raj
  - Body: Grampanchayat

Population (2011)
  - Total: 3,120

Languages
  - Official: Marathi
- Time zone: UTC+5:30 (IST)
- PIN: 413736
- Telephone code: 02423
- Vehicle registration: MH-17

Gogalgaon is a village in Rahata taluka of Ahmednagar district in the Indian state of Maharashtra.

== Location ==
Village is located at the south part of Rahata taluka and it is near to Loni village.

== Population ==
According to the 2011 census, the population of the village is 3120, out of which 1,060 are male residents and 922 are female residents.

== Economy ==
Most of the village residents are engaged in agriculture and allied works.

== Transport ==
=== Road ===
Kolhar-Loni-Nandur Shingote highway passes through the village.

=== Rail ===
Shirdi and Belapur railway stations are the nearest railway station to village.

=== Air ===
Shirdi Airport is the nearest airport to village.

== See also ==
- List of villages in Rahata taluka
