= Ruey =

Ruey is a surname. Notable people with the surname include:

- Claude Ruey (born 1949), Swiss politician
- James Kok Ruey (fl. from 2015), South Sudanese governor

== See also ==
- Rui (disambiguation)
