= Adgaon Khurd =

Village in Maharashtra, India

- village
- Location in Maharashtra, India
- Coordinates: 19°40′09″N 74°25′01″E
- Country: India
- State: Maharashtra
- District: Ahmednagar
- Taluka: Rahata

Government
  - Type: Panchayati raj
  - Body: Grampanchayat

Population (2011)
  - Total: 981

Languages
  - Official: Marathi
- Time zone: UTC+5:30 (IST)
- PIN: 423107
- Telephone code: 02423
- Vehicle registration: MH-17

Adgaon Khurd is a small village in Rahata taluka of Ahmednagar district in the Indian state of Maharashtra.

== Population ==
As per 2011 census, population of village is 981, of which 520 are males and 461 are females.

== Transport ==
=== Road ===
Adgaon Khurd is connected to nearby villages by village roads.

=== Rail ===
Shirdi is nearest railway station to village.

=== Air ===
Shirdi Airport is located near a village.

== See also ==
- List of villages in Rahata taluka
