= Rajouri (disambiguation) =

Rajouri is a municipality in Jammu and Kashmir, India.

Rajouri or Rajori or Rajuri may refer to several places in India.

== Jammu and Kashmir ==
- Rajouri district
  - 1947–1948 Rajouri massacre
- Rajouri Tawi River
- Rajouri Airport
- Rajouri (Vidhan Sabha constituency)

== West Delhi ==
- Rajouri Garden, a neighborhood in West Delhi
- Rajouri Garden (Delhi Assembly constituency)
- Rajouri Garden metro station

== Maharashtra ==
- Rajuri, Ahmednagar
