= Nathu Patlachi Wadi =

Village in Maharashtra

Nathu Patlachi Wadi Na Pa Wadi
- village
- Location in Maharashtra, India
- Coordinates: 19°45′45″N 74°33′00″E
- Country: India
- State: Maharashtra
- District: Ahmednagar
- Taluka: Rahata

Government
  - Body: Grampanchayat

Population (2011)
  - Total: 1,800

Languages
  - Official: Marathi
- Time zone: UTC+5:30 (IST)
- Telephone code: 02423
- Vehicle registration: MH-17

Nathu Patlachi Wadi is a village in Rahata taluka of Ahmednagar district in state of Maharashtra, India.

== Demographics ==
Population of Nathu Patlachi Wadi is 1800. 952 are males and 848 are females.

== See also ==
- List of villages in Rahata taluka
