= Mohta =

Village in Maharashtra

- village
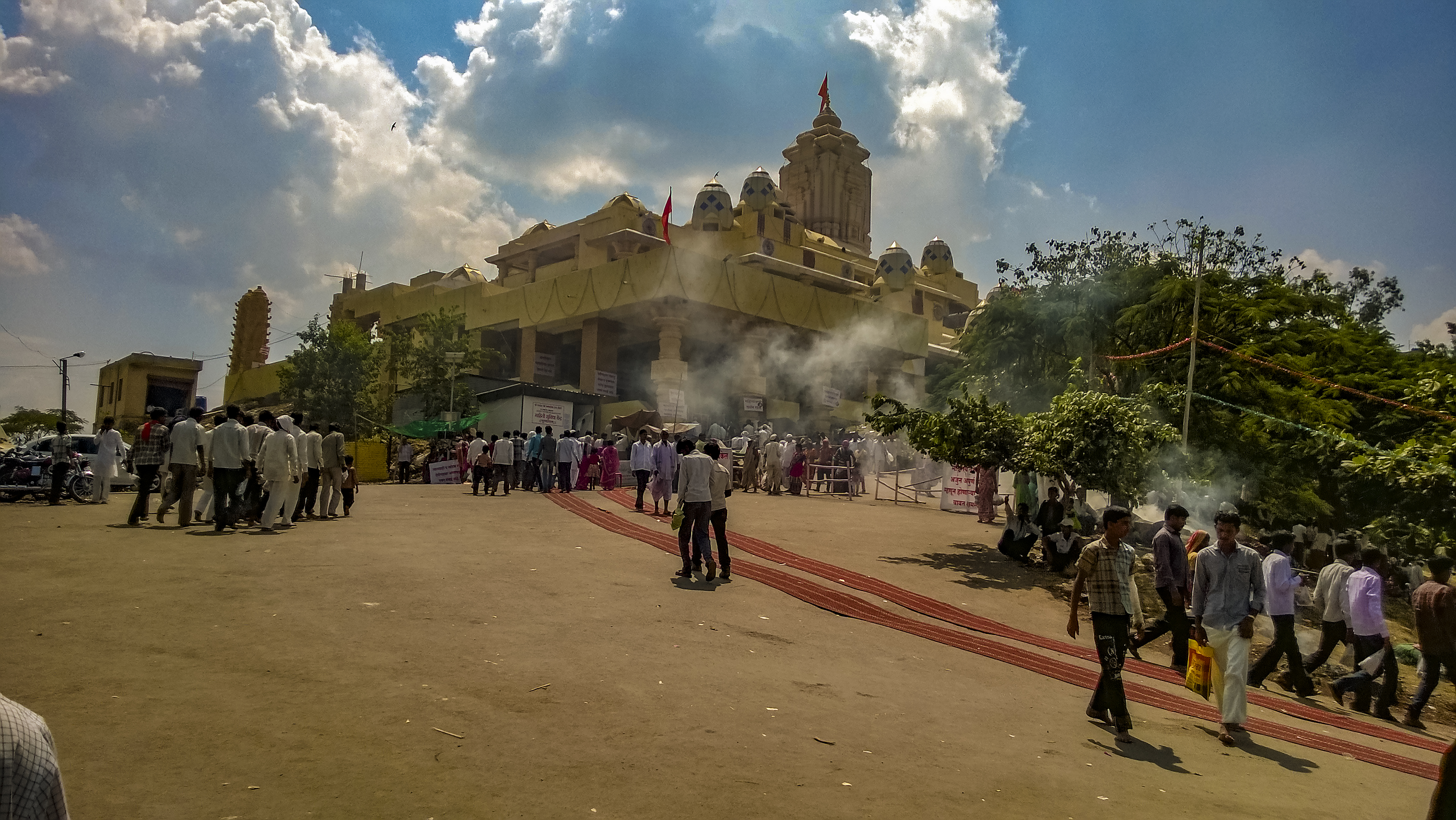
- Country: India
- State: Maharashtra
- District: Ahmednagar

Languages
  - Official: Marathi
- Time zone: UTC+5:30 (IST)
- Vehicle registration: MH-
- Coastline: 0 kilometres (0 mi)

Mohta is a village in Pathardi Taluka of Ahmednagar district.

== Importance ==
Temple-town of Renuka Mata. Yatra is celebrated during Navratri.

== Location ==
70 km east of Ahmednagar, 9 km from Pathardi in Maharashtra. There are many buses of State Transport to reach at the God, from Beed to Shirur Via Pathardi and Beed to Yelam Via Pathardi also from Aurangabad, Paithan Shevgaon to Pathardi Via Aashti there are many buses for an hour from Pathardi

A film called Jai Mohata Devi was made in 2008.

Nearest Airport : Aurangabad Airport.

Nearest Railway Station : Ahmednagar Railway Station.

Nearby cities: Beed, Ahmednagar
