= Nandur Nimba Daitya =

Nandur Nimba Daitya नांदूर निम्बा दैत्य
- Village
- Etymology: Local tradition links the name to the deity Nimba Daitya
- Interactive map of Nandur Nimba Daitya
- Location in Maharashtra, India Nandur Nimba Daitya (India)
- Coordinates (Nandur Nimbadaitya village): 19.0988°N 75.0496°E
- Country: India
- State: Maharashtra
- District: Ahmednagar
- Taluka: Pathardi

Government
  - Type: Panchayati Raj
  - Body: Gram Panchayat
- Elevation: 552 m (1,811 ft)

Population (2011)
  - Total: 2,189
- Sex ratio: 965 females per 1000 males
- Time zone: UTC+5:30 (IST)
- PIN: 414106
- Telephone code: 02428
- ISO 3166 code: IN-MH

Nandur Nimba Daitya is a village situated in the Pathardi taluka of Ahmednagar district in the Indian state of Maharashtra. The village is known for its distinctive local religious tradition centered on the worship of the deity Nimba Daitya, which is accompanied by a complete and strict prohibition against any reference to or worship of Lord Hanuman (also known by the name Maruti).

== Geography ==
Nandur Nimba Daitya is located approximately 24 kilometers (15 mi) from the taluka headquarters, Pathardi, and 66 kilometers (41 mi) from the district headquarters in Ahmednagar. Some local accounts associate the surrounding region with the Dandakaranya forest mentioned in Hindu legend.

== Demographics ==
As per the 2011 Census of India, Nandur Nimba Daitya recorded a total population of 2,189 residents, with 1,114 males and 1,075 females. The village's average sex ratio stood at 965 females per 1,000 males, a figure higher than the Maharashtra state average of 929.

The overall literacy rate in the village was 80.5%, which surpasses the Ahmednagar district average. Male literacy was significantly higher at 92.06%, while female literacy was recorded at 68.76%. Census data indicates that the village comprises approximately 474 households.

== Culture and religion ==
Nandur Nimba Daitya is distinguished by its unique religious and cultural practices centred on the worship of a demon named Nimba Daitya, who is revered as a local deity and regarded as the village's divine protector.

The most defining feature of this tradition is the absolute avoidance of all references to Lord Hanuman, or the use of the name Maruti. Consequently, the village lacks any temples dedicated to Hanuman, and there are no images, idols, or objects bearing the Maruti name, including vehicles manufactured by the Maruti brand. Local beliefs attribute the prohibition to the notion that Hanuman's presence brings misfortune or negative consequences.

According to village folklore, Hanuman and Nimba Daitya once engaged in a battle which resulted in both falling unconscious. Lord Rama is said to have subsequently intervened, designating Nimba Daitya as the perpetual protector of the village and simultaneously removing Hanuman from the village's religious observances. However, villagers participate in the worship of other prominent Hindu deities, including Ganesha, Krishna, and Sai Baba of Shirdi.

== See also ==
- List of villages in Pathardi taluka
