= Rampurwadi =

Village in Maharashtra

- village
- Location in Maharashtra, India
- Coordinates: 19°43′55″N 74°34′32″E
- Country: India
- State: Maharashtra
- District: Ahmednagar
- Taluka: Rahata

Government
  - Body: Grampanchayat

Population (2011)
  - Total: 3,100

Languages
  - Official: Marathi
- Time zone: UTC+5:30 (IST)
- PIN: 413719
- Telephone code: 02423
- Vehicle registration: MH-17

Rampurwadi is a village in Rahata taluka of Ahmednagar district in Indian state of Maharashtra.

== Demographics ==
As per 2011 census, population of Rampurwadi is 3100 of which 1624 are males and 1476 are females.

== See also ==
- List of villages in Rahata taluka
