= Kasare, Sangamner =

Village in Maharashtra

Kasare
- village
- Location in Maharashtra, India Kasare (India)
- Coordinates: 19°39′28″N 74°22′03″E
- Country: India
- State: Maharashtra
- District: Ahmadnagar
- Taluka: Sangamner

Government
  - Body: Village Panchayat

Languages
  - Official: Marathi
- Time zone: UTC+5:30 (IST)
- Lok Sabha constituency: Shirdi
- Vidhan Sabha constituency: Sangamner

Kasare, is a small village in Ahmednagar district of Maharashtra, India. This village is located about equidistant between Talegaon to the northwest and Gogalgaon to the southeast on State Highway 45.

== Demographics ==
In the 2001 census, the village of Kasare had 1,417 inhabitants, with 726 males (51.2%) and 691 females (48.8%), for a gender ratio of 952 females per thousand males.

In the 2011 census, the village of Kasare had 1,776 inhabitants, for a net gain of 359 over the preceding decade.

== Religion ==
The majority of the population in Kasare is Hindu. There are several temples in the village, including the Kalika Mata Temple, the Hanumanji Temple, and the Gurdev Datta Temple.
