= Sawali Vihir Bk =

Village in Maharashtra

Sawali Vihir Budruk
- village
- Location in Maharashtra, India
- Coordinates: 19°48′11″N 74°28′02″E
- Country: India
- State: Maharashtra
- District: Ahmednagar
- Taluka: Rahata

Government
  - Body: Grampanchayat

Population (2011)
  - Total: 7,115

Languages
  - Official: Marathi
- Time zone: UTC+5:30 (IST)
- PIN: 423109
- Telephone code: 02423
- Vehicle registration: MH-17

Sawali Vihir Budruk is a village in Rahata taluka of Ahmednagar district in state of Maharashtra of India.

== Demographics ==
Population of Sawali Vihir Bk. is 7,115 of which males are 3,575 and females are 3,540.

== Economy ==
Majority of the population is involved in farming. Business is also setting up due to proximity to Shirdi city.

== Transport ==
=== Road ===
Two state highways pass through the village which connect Shirdi, Nashik, Mumbai, Ahmednagar and Pune.

=== Rail ===
Shirdi railway station is the nearest railway station to the village.

== See also ==
- List of villages in Rahata taluka
