= Rui (given name) =

Rui is a Portuguese male given name (sometimes spelled Ruy), a Japanese unisex name, and a Chinese unisex name component (sometimes spelled Ruei or Jui).

In Portuguese, it is not proven that “Ruy” originated as a diminutive of “Rodrigo”, as the transformation does not follow a simple diminutive pattern as with other names in the Iberian Peninsula. The name “Ruy” (or “Rui” in modern Portuguese) has been historically documented since the 12th century and was used independently of “Rodrigo”. It can be found in medieval records and documents of nobles in both Galicia and Portugal, where it is still used to this day in the form of Rui/Roi/Rói. Its popularity in Galician-Portuguese indicates an independent use rather than a speculative derivation from “Rodrigo”. For example, names such as “Ruy” and “Rodrigo” appear in the “Livro de Linhagens” (family register) from the 13th century, but not as variants of each other. It is hypothesized to have an independent, pre-roman origin related to other linguistic roots, including Celtic influences such as the Gaelic word red (rua/ruadh/ruy/rhudd/rudh/ruz), which is related to “Rory” (Gaelic Ruaidhrí - red king). This etymology of the name would mean that the name translates as “red” in its origin.

Notable people with the name include:

- Rui Abreu (1961–1982), Portuguese swimmer
- Rui Águas (born 1960), Portuguese footballer
- Rui Andrade (born 1999), Angolan-Portuguese racing driver
- Rui Areias (born 1993), Portuguese footballer
- Rui Barbosa (1849–1923), Brazilian diplomat, writer, jurist, and politician
- Rui Campos (1922–2002), Brazilian footballer
- Ruy de Carvalho (born 1927), Portuguese actor
- Rui Correia (born 1967), Portuguese football goalkeeper
- Rui Costa (born 1972), Portuguese football midfielder
- Rui Costa (cyclist) (born 1986), Portuguese cyclist
- Rui da Gracia (born 1985), Spanish-born naturalized Equatoguinean football defender, known mononymously as Rui
- Rui de Figueiredo (1929–2013), professor, engineer and mathematician
- Rui de Pina (1440–1521), Portuguese chronicler
- Rui En (born 1981), Singaporean actress
- Rui Falcão (born 1943), Brazilian politician
- Rui Faria (born 1975), Portuguese football coach
- Rui Faria (footballer, born 1980), Portuguese football goalkeeper
- Rui Faria (footballer, born 1992), Portuguese footballer
- Rui Gomes (disambiguation), several people
- Rui Hachimura (八村 塁; born 1998), Japanese basketball player
- Rui Jordão (1952–2019), Portuguese football striker
- Rui Jorge (born 1973), Portuguese football back
- Rui Jorge (politician) (born 1998), Brazilian politician
- Rui Lacerda (born 1991), Portuguese marathon canoeist
- Rui Machado (born 1984), Portuguese tennis player
- Rui Machida (町田瑠唯; born 1993), Japanese basketball player
- Rui Manuel Sousa Valério (born 1964), Catholic patriarch of Lisbon
- Rui Monteiro (born 1977), Cape Verde-born Dutch footballer
- Rui Nereu (born 1986), Portuguese football goalkeeper
- Rui Oliveira (born 1996), Portuguese cyclist
- Rui Patrício (born 1988), Portuguese football goalkeeper
- Rui Pedro, several people
- Rui Reininho, Portuguese musician
- Rui Rio (born 1957), Portuguese politician and former Mayor of Porto (Presidente da Câmara Municipal)
- Rui Rita, American lighting designer
- Rui Sasaki (born 1984), Japanese glass artist
- Rui Soares (born 1993), Portuguese squash player
- Rui Tanabe (田辺 留依, born 1997), Japanese voice actress
- Rui Ukita (浮田 留衣; born 1996), Japanese ice hockey player
- Rui Veloso (born 1957), Portuguese musician known to be the father of Portuguese Rock'n Roll
