= Jui =

Jui or JUI may refer to:

- Jamiat Ulema-e-Islam (JUI), a Pakistani religious political party which split in 1988 into JUI-F and JUI-S
- Rui (state) (芮; Jui in Wade–Giles), a Chinese state during the Zhou dynasty
- Rui (surname) (芮; Jui in Wade–Giles), a Chinese surname
- jui, the ISO 639-3 code for the extinct Ngadjuri language

== See also ==
- Dhakti Jui, a village in Uran Taluka, Raigad District, Maharashtra, India
