= Lohasar =

Village in Maharashtra, India

- Lohsar
- Location within Maharashtra Location within India
- Coordinates: 19°11′02″N 74°57′56″E
- Country: India
- State: Maharashtra
- District: Ahmednagar
- Tahsil: Pathardi
- Post Office: Lohsar Khandgaon

Government
  - Sarpanch: Upsapanch: Anil Gite (2018 - 2023): -----

Population (2011)
  - Total: 2,017
- Time zone: IST
- Postal code: 414106
- Vehicle registration: MH-16

Lohasar is a village and panchayat located in Pathardi taluka in the Ahmednagar district of Maharashtra state, India.

The village covers an area of 1,114 hectares. As of 2017, the population was 2,017 (1,051 males and 966 females) in 379 households.

The native language of Lohasar is Marathi.
