= Madhi =

Village in Maharashtra

Mahdi mahdi
- City
- Location within Maharashtra
- Coordinates: 19.1552°N 75.1045°E
- Country: India
- State: Maharashtra
- District: Ahmednagar
- Taluka: Pathardi
- Named for: Madhi

Languages
  - Official: Marathi
- Time zone: UTC+5:30 (IST)
- Telephone code: 02428
- Vehicle registration: MH-16
- Website: maharashtra.gov.in

Madhi is a village in Pathardi taluka of Ahmednagar district in Maharashtra.

== Importance ==
Samādhi place of Shri Kanifnath one of Navnaths. The Kanifnath fair is held on Phalguna Vadya 5(Holi) to Chaitra Shuddha 1(Gudhi Padwa) for 15 days in honour of the saint Kanifnath. The nomadic tribe-Gopal enjoys the honour of firing the sacred Holi at this place. The community courts of the tribes administered justice and solve the family disputes. The Bazar of Donkeys is held during the yatra., was believed to be the seat of one of the principal preachers and philosophers of the Nath sect, Kanifnath, as mentioned in the Navnath Sar (A composition that contains tenets of Navnath panth.) It is also a holy place for nomads of the Vaidu community from all over India. More than 7 lakhs Nath-bhakt visits at "Madhi" on Phalgun vadhya panchami (Rangpanchami)

== Location ==
It is 51 km away from Ahmednagar towards east. Madhi is east of Nivdunge village on National Highway 222. Pathardi is 10 km from Madhi. There are three roads to go to Madhi one from Pathardi, second from Nivdunge and third one from Tisgaon.

== Temple ==
The Samādhi is in beautiful stones. The Temple was built by Muslim artisans under the supervision of Begum Chand Bibi's maternal uncle. Both Muslims and Hindus value and pray at the four temple complex. Located three hours drive from Shirdi, outside a small village named Madhi, it is a perfect example of Muslim architecture. On climbing approximately 70 stairs you would reach the Gadh as it is commonly known. Of the four temple complexes, the centre one is that of Samadhi.

The Samādhi of the saint has approaches from three different directions. A flight of about 200 steps leads to the Samādhi. The Samādhi of the saint is made of stone in the shape of a turbat. At the four corners of the tomb there are minarets with a small-sized dome at the top of each. Over the Samādhi is a gold-plated pinnacle of brass. The shrine in which the tomb of the saint is located is a lofty building surrounded by a wall with twelve doors. There are also a few Samādhi of the disciples of the saint. A horse of brass is placed before the Samādhi of the saint.
