= Jambhali =

Indian village

Coordinates: 18°15′14″N 73°50′09″E

Jambhali is a village in the Bhor taluka in the Pune District of Maharashtra, India.

== Geography ==
Jambhali has a total geographical area of village is 497.34 hectares. It is situated 26 km away from the sub-district headquarter of Bhor, and 42 km away from district headquarter of Pune. As per 2009 statistics, Jambhali village has a gram panchayat. It belongs to Desh or Paschim Maharashtra region. It is administrated under the Pune Division.

== Demographics ==
According to the 2011 census, the population of Jambhali is 1120, divided into 260 families. The total male population 554 and the total female population is 566.

== History ==
The village was originally part of the Bhor State, under the rule of the Pantsachiv Kings. Beginning in the 1640s, majority of the land was settled by the Phatak gharana of Jambhali as vassals to the Pantsachiv kings, which later split itself into a first and second House.

== See also ==
- Bhor State
