= Loni, Ahmednagar =

Town in Maharashtra, India

Loni, also known as Loni Pravara, is a town in Rahata taluka, Ahmednagar, Maharashtra, India. It is known for the biggest Shiv Jayanti Festival in the district. There are many colleges in this town. Climate is dry and moderate.

== Lontek Temple ==
This is a small temple on top of a hill dedicated to Goddess Durga with a large idol of Shiva.

== Nizarneshwar Temple ==
This is a temple to Shiva at Nizarneshwar, 16 kilometers from Loni toward Sangamner.

== Pravara Sugar Mill ==
This is the first cooperative sugar mill in Asia, set up in 1950, established by Dr. Vithallrao Vikhe Patil.
