= Rahta Pimplas =

- city
- Location in Maharashtra, India
- Coordinates: 19.7413°N 74.4802°E
- Country: India
- State: Maharashtra
- District: Ahmednagar

Population (2001)
  - Total: 19,024

Languages
  - Official: Marathi
- Time zone: UTC+5:30 (IST)

Rahta Pimplas is a city and a municipal council in the Ahmednagar district in the Indian state of Maharashtra.

== Demographics ==
As of 2001 India census, Rahta Pimplas had a population of 19,024. Males constitute 51% of the population and females 49%. Rahta Pimplas has an average literacy rate of 72%, higher than the national average of 59.5%: male literacy is 79%, and female literacy is 65%. In Rahta Pimplas, 13% of the population is under 6 years of age.
