= List of villages in Rahata taluka =

There are around 60 villages in Rahata tehsil of Ahmednagar district of state of Maharashtra. Following is the list of village in Rahata tehsil.

== A ==
- Adgaon Bk
- Adgaon Kh
- Astagaon

== B ==
- Babhaleshwar
- Bhagwatipur

== C ==
- Chandrapur
- Chitali

== D ==
- Dadh BK
- Dhangarwadi
- Dorhale
- Durgapur
- Dahigaon Korhale

== E ==
- Ekrukhe

== G ==
- Gogalgaon

== H ==
- Hanmantgoan
- Hasnapur

== J ==
- Jalgaon

== K ==
- Khadkewake
- Kankuri
- Kelwad
- Korhale
- Kolhar Budhrukh

== L ==
- Lohagaon
- Loni Bk
- Loni Khurd

== M ==
- Mamdapur

== N ==
- Nandur Bk
- Nandurkhi Bk
- Nandurkhi Kh
- Nighoj
- Nimgoan Korhale
- Nathu Patlachi Wadi

== P ==
- Pathare Budruk
- Pimplas
- Pimpri Lokai
- Pimpri Nirmal
- Pimpalwadi
- Puntamba

== R ==
- Rajuri
- Rampurwadi
- Ranjangaon Khurd
- Ranjankhol
- Rui

== S ==
- Sakuri
- Savalvihir Bk.
- Savalvihir Kh.
- Shingave
- Shirdi

== T ==
- Tisgoan

== W ==
- Wakadi
- Walki

== See also ==
- Rahata tehsil
- Tehsils in Ahmednagar
- Villages in Akole tehsil
- Villages in Jamkhed tehsil
- Villages in Karjat tehsil
- Villages in Kopargaon tehsil
- Villages in Nagar tehsil
- Villages in Nevasa tehsil
- Villages in Parner tehsil
- Villages in Pathardi tehsil
- Villages in Rahuri tehsil
- Villages in Sangamner tehsil
- Villages in Shevgaon tehsil
- Villages in Shrigonda tehsil
- Villages in Shrirampur tehsil
