= Pimpalwadi =

Village in Maharashtra

- village
- Location in Maharashtra, India
- Coordinates: 19°45′41″N 74°31′17″E
- Country: India
- State: Maharashtra
- District: Ahmednagar
- Taluka: Rahata

Government
  - Body: Grampanchayat

Population (2011)
  - Total: 4,034

Languages
  - Official: Marathi
- Time zone: UTC+5:30 (IST)
- PIN: 423109
- Telephone code: 02423
- Vehicle registration: MH-17

Pimpalwadi is a village in Rahata taluka of Ahmednagar district in state of Maharashtra, This village famous for so many Brisk factories. Pimpalwadi village has two schools, Z.P. Govt. Primary School and CSMV Senior Secondary school. For upper education students have to go Shirdi, Kopargaon, Rahata or loni. Out of Maharashtra Largest brisk supplier live in this village. Yearly turn over is near about 5-6 Cr rupis.

== Demographics ==
The population of Pimpalwadi is 4,034 of which males are 2,129 and females are 1,905. Village is 5 km from Shirdi the holy Saibaba city. Most of the villagers goes to Shirdi for earning daily wage.

== See also ==
- List of villages in Rahata taluka
