= Ruy =

Ruy or RUY may refer to:

== Arts and Entertainment ==
- Ruy, the Little Cid, Spanish animated television series
- Ruy Blas, a character in the eponymous tragic drama by Victor Hugo

== People ==
- another form of Rui, a Portuguese male given name
- another form of the Spanish male given name Rodrigo
- Ruy Finch, geologist active in the 1930's
- Ruy López de Segura (1530-1580), Spanish chess player
- Ruy Ramos (born 1957), Japanese footballer
- Ruy (footballer) (born 1989), Brazilian footballer

== Places ==
- Ruy, Isère, a commune in France
- Ruy, Iran, a city in Iran
- Ruy Special Town, a village in Iran
- Ruy Mountain, a mountain on the border of Bulgaria and Serbia

== Transport ==
- Copán Ruinas Airport (IATA: RUY), an airport serving the town of Copán Ruinas in Honduras

== Other uses ==
- Ruy Lopez, a chess opening named after the Spanish chess player
