= Rui Gomes =

Rui Gomes may refer to:

== Government ==
- Rui Gomes de Abreu, alcaide (c.1460–1530?), who served as Alcaide Mayor of Elvas, Portugal
- Ruy Gómez de Silva, 1st Prince of Éboli (1516 – 1573), a Portuguese noble, and adviser to the Spanish King
- Rui Gomes (politician), East Timorese politician, administrator and academic

== Sports ==
- Rui Gomes (footballer, born 1987), Portuguese footballer
- Rui Gomes (footballer, born 1997), Portuguese footballer
- Rui Gomes (football manager) (born 1970), Portuguese football manager
