= Akola, Chittorgarh =

Akola Chhipo ka Akola
- NAGAR PALIKA 2023
- Location within Rajasthan Location within India
- Coordinates: 24.9°N 74.33°E
- Country: India
- State: Rajasthan
- District: Chittorgarh
- Founder: Unknown

Government
  - Type: NAGAR PALIKA
  - PRESIDENT: TARA DEVI MALIWAL
- Elevation: 451 m (1,480 ft)

Population (2015)
  - Total: 12,000
- Time zone: UTC+5:30 (IST)
- Pincode(s): 312205
- Vehicle registration: RJ- 09
- Spoken languages: Hindi, Mewadi,

Akola, also known as Chhipo ka Akola, is a village in Bhupalsagar tehsil of Chittorgarh district in the Indian state of Rajasthan. Akola is famous for dabu print. the dabu print is famous on all over India

== Location ==
It belong to Udaipur division. It is located 52km towards west form district headquarters chittorgarh, 13km from Bhopalsagar, 339km from state capital Jaipur. Akola is surrounded by kapasan tehsil towards North, Mavli tehsil towards west, Bhinder tehsil towards south, Railmagra tehsil towards North.
