= Phatak (surname) =

Indian surname

Phatak is a surname used by Chitpavan Brahmins of the Kaushik gotra.

== People ==
- Ashutosh Phatak, Indian music composer
- Balkrishna Phatak, war secretary during the Peshwai
- Deepak B. Phatak (b. 1948), Indian computer scientist
- Chimnaji Phatak, aide-de-camp during the Peshwai
- Jairaj Phatak, Indian IAS officer
- Narahar Raghunath Phatak (1893–1979), Indian biographer and literary critic
- Ramachandra Krishanji Phatak (1917–2002), Marathi music composer and singer
- Ravindra Phatak, Indian politician for Shiv Sena
