= Rui (state) =

Rui (Chinese: 芮; Wade–Giles: Jui) was a Chinese vassal state during the Zhou dynasty (1046–256 BCE) During Spring and Autumn period.

In 703 BC, the rulers of the five states of Western Guo, Rui, Xun (荀國) and Jia (賈國), and Liang, suppressed Duke Wu of Quwo using armed force.

In 641 BC, the State of Qin easily conquered Rui along with the State of Liang.

== Archaeological discoveries ==
Between 2016 and 2018 archaeological excavations were carried out at an Eastern Zhou site near Liujiawa (刘家洼) village in Chengcheng County, Shaanxi. The site consists of the remains of an ancient city, and more than 200 burials situated in four areas. Some of the tombs were very large, and contained large numbers of high value burial goods, including sets of bronze ritual vessels, sets of bronze bells, sets of stone chimes, wooden musical instruments, and other artefacts made from gold (a gold tiger, gold earrings), jade and lacquer. Some of the bronze vessels had inscriptions on them stating that they were made for the Duke of Rui, which indicated that the site must be that of the Rui capital, and the large tombs must be for the dukes of Rui and their family. The main tombs are thought to date to the early Spring and Autumn period of the Eastern Zhou.
