= Dharwadi =

Maharashtra village

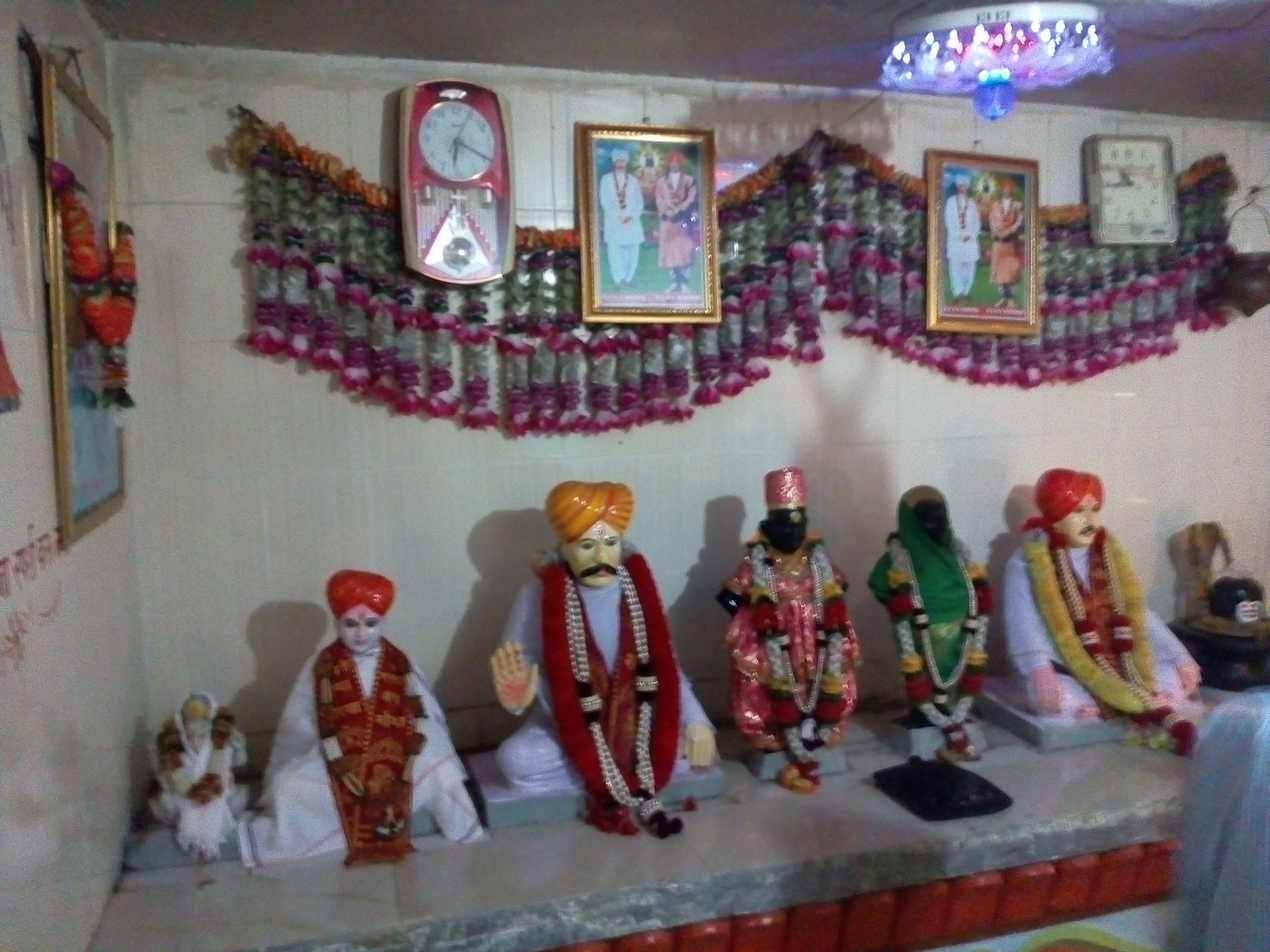
- Motto: Vamanbhau Maharaj ki Jay
- Location within Maharashtra Location within India Location within Asia
- Coordinates: 19°12′12″N 74°56′42″E
- Country: India
- State: Maharashtra
- District: Ahmednagar
- Tahsil: Pathardi
- Post Office: Chichondi Siral
- Village: Dharwadi

Government
  - Sarpanch: Upsapanch: Bhimraj Sonawane (2024 - 2029): Bhausaheb Gore
- Time zone: IST
- Postal code: 414106
- Vehicle registration: MH-16
- Website: www.darwadi.mahapanchayat.gov.in

Dharwadi is a village in Pathardi taluka in Ahilyanagar District of Maharashtra State, India. It belongs to Khandesh and Northern Maharashtra region. It belongs to Nashik Division. It is located 28 km towards East from District headquarters Ahmednagar. 29 km from Pathardi. 257 km from State capital Mumbai.

== Sarpanch List ==
Sr.no	Sarpanch	Up Sarpanch	Year From	Year To	Remark
1	Kailas Gite	-	1993	1998	-
2	Kailas Gite	Baban Gite	1998	2009	-
3	Bhairu Sonawane (Guruji)	Bapu Gore/ Bhimraj Sonawane	Jun 2009	Jun 2014	-
4	Bhimraj Sonawane	Bapu Gore	Jun 2014	Jun 2019	-
5	Bapu Gore	Udhav Kalapahad (KP)	Jun 2019	Jun 2024	-
6	Bhimraj Sonwane*	Bhausaheb Gore*	Jun 2024*		-

== Population ==
Sr.no	Census Parameters	Census Data
1	Total Population	910
2	Total House	195
3	Female Population% -48.7%	443
4	Total Literacy Rate% -60.6%	551
5	Child(0-6)	108
6	Girl Child(0-6)	75

== Local schools in Dharwadi ==
- Shri Tilok Jain Jr College Pathardi
- Babuji Avhad Mahavidyalaya
- Shri Navnath junior high school and college

== Nearest colleges to Dharwadi ==
- Pathardi: Shri Tilok Jain Jr College Pathardi and Babuji Avhad Mahavidyalaya
- Karanji: Shri Navnath junior high school and college

== Temples in Dharwadi ==
- Shri VamanBhau Mandir
- Shri Maruti Mandir
- Shri Lakshmi Mandir
- Shri Tulajabhawani Mandir
- Shri MohataDevi Mandir
- Shri GosaiBaba Mandir

== Nearest villages to Dharwadi ==
- Khandgaon (5 km)
- Damalwadi (5 km)
- Kolhar (5 km)
- Kadgaon (6 km)
- Mohoj Khurd (6 km)
- Lohsar (2.5 km)
- Chichondi-Shiral (2.5 km)

== Images of Dharwadi ==
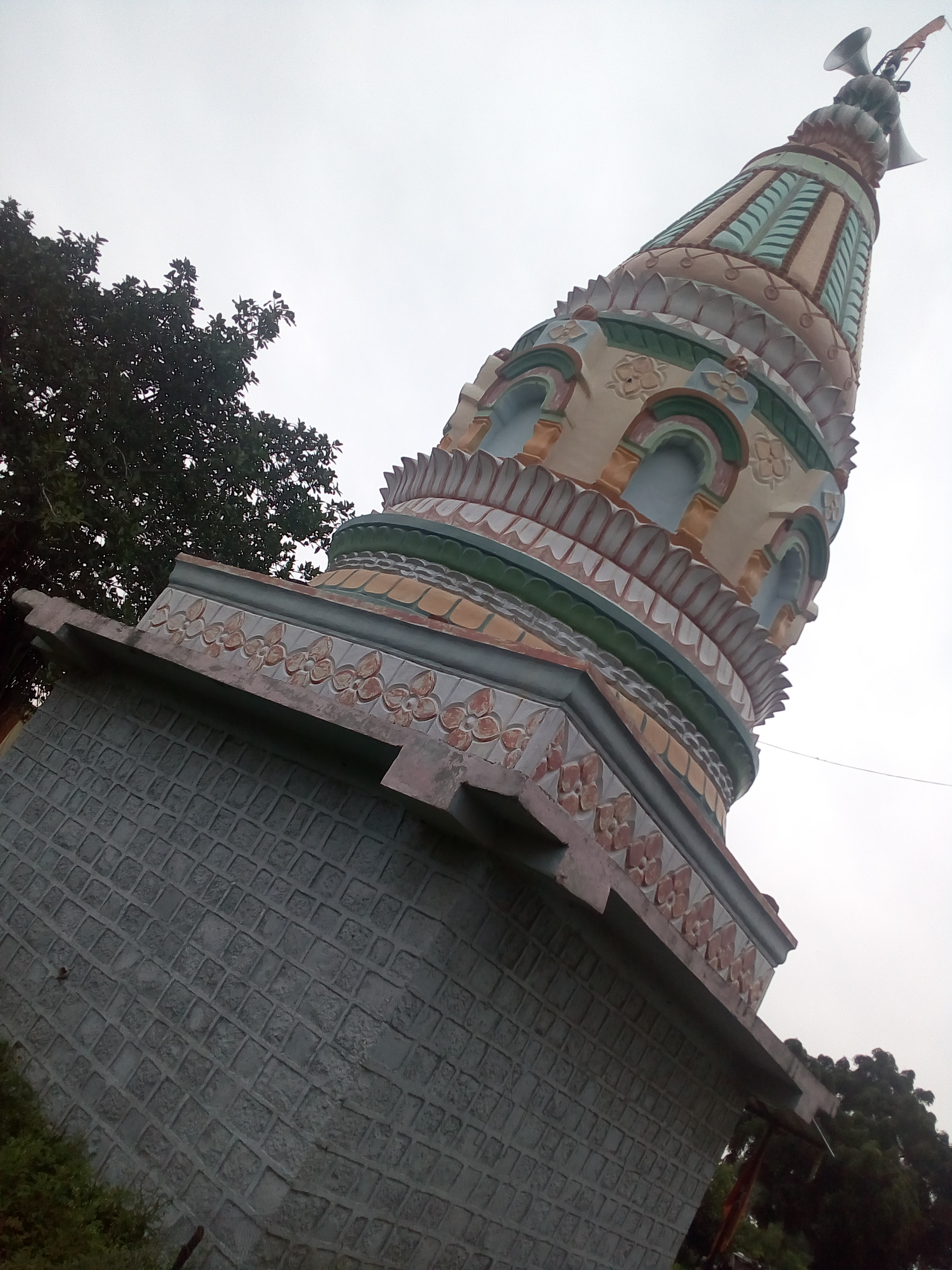

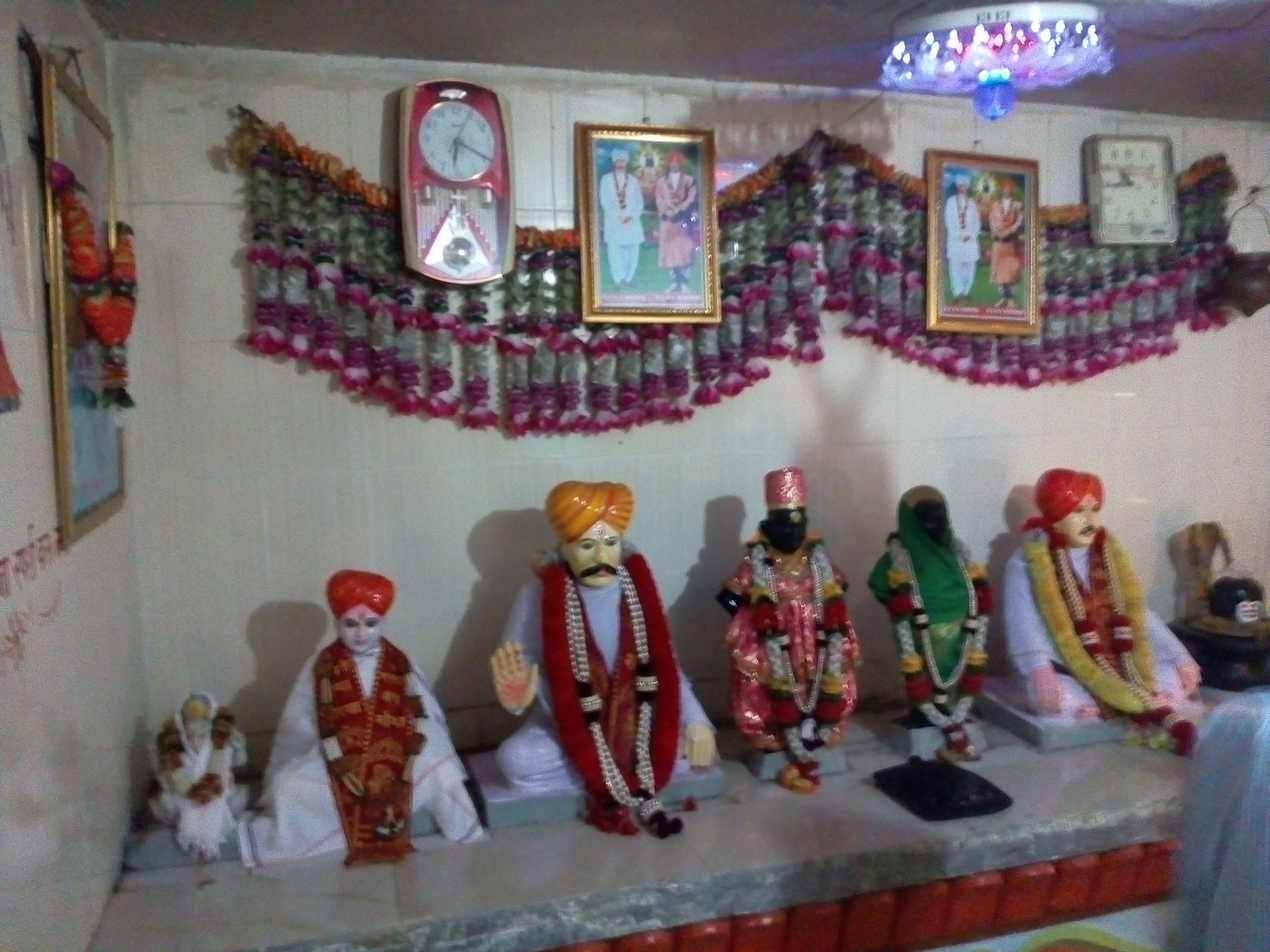
shri Vamanbhau Mandir
