= Tisgaon =

- City
- Tisgaon
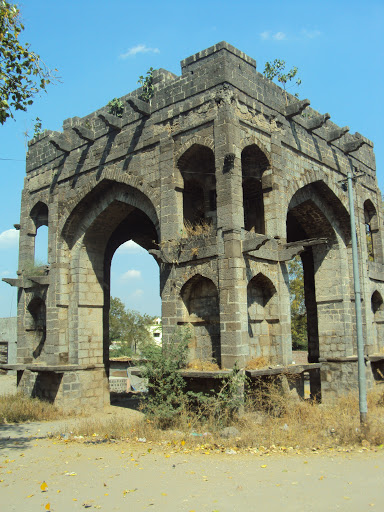
- Five Stone Gates, Tisgaon
- Nickname: तिसगाव
- Location of Tisgaon in India Tisgaon (India) Tisgaon (Asia)
- Coordinates: 19°19′N 75°06′E
- Country: India
- State: Maharashtra
- District: Ahilyanagar

Government
  - Body: Tisgaon Gram Panchayat
- Elevation: 560 m (1,840 ft)

Population (2011)
  - Total: 37,945;(49,161:suburb)
- Demonym: Tisgaonkar

Languages
  - Official: Marathi
- Time zone: UTC+5:30 (IST)
- Postal code: 414106
- Vehicle registration: MH-16

Tisgaon is a village in the Pathardi Taluka of Ahilyanagar District, Maharashtra, India.

== Geography ==
Tisgaon is located approximately 12 km from Pathardi and 40 km from Ahilyanagar. It covers an area of 1,506 hectares and is governed by the Tisgaon Gram Panchayat.

== Demographics ==
As per the 2011 Census of India, Tisgaon had a population of 7,707 with a sex ratio of 940 females per 1,000 males.

== History ==
The village features five ancient gates, maintained by the Archaeology Department of Maharashtra. The most notable is the Ahmednagar Gate, which is 40 feet high with arched entrances on all four sides.
