= Pathardi =

Village in Maharashtra

Pathardi Hatral
- Town
- Location in Maharashtra, India Pathardi (India)
- Coordinates: 19.17°N 75.18°E
- Country: [India]
- State: Maharashtra
- District: Ahilyanagar
- Elevation: 533 m (1,749 ft)

Population (2001)
  - Total: 228,279

Languages
  - Official: Marathi
- Time zone: UTC+5:30 (IST)
- PIN: 414102
- Telephone code: 02428
- Vehicle registration: MH16
- Website: http://www.pathardi.in/

Pathardi is a town and a municipal council in Ahilyanagar district in the Indian state of Maharashtra.

== Geography ==
Although politically/governmentally it is considered to be in the Western Maharashtra, geographically and according to climate it is similar to the Marathwada region. it is town located near along with famous Holy pilgrimage such as Madhi (Kanifnath temple), Bhagwan gadh, Mohta Devi temple.

== Demographics ==
As of 2011 India census, Pathardi had a population of 2,14,872. Males constitute 52% of the population and females 48%. Pathardi has an average literacy rate of 72%, higher than the national average of 59.5%. Male literacy is 79%, and female literacy is 64%. 13% of the population is under age 6.

== Governance ==
The city has a municipal council (created in 1991) represented by a 17-member council. Currently BJP is ruling party in municipal council with 12 members. Monika Rajeev Rajale is current MLA of this constituency from BJP

== Temples ==
An outdoor theater is in the central part of the city.

More than 10 temples are in the taluk. They include:

- Mohata Devi–10 km from Pathardi City (one of the largest temples of Goddess) [south easterly].
- Chaitanya Kanifnath –in Madhi, about 12 km from Pathardi [westerly]
- Shri Vriddheshwar Shiva–in the hills, a natural spot with medicinal plants [south westerly]
- Bhagwangad –eastern part of Pathardi city [easterly]
- Salsidheshwar devastan Midsangavi [easterly]
- Nandur Nimbadaitya–eastern part of Pathardi taluka is a daitya considered to be God
- Anandtirth –28.7 km from Pathardi City (one of the largest Jain tirth).

Durgadevi gad(bhilwade)
