= Pathardi taluka =

- Tehsil
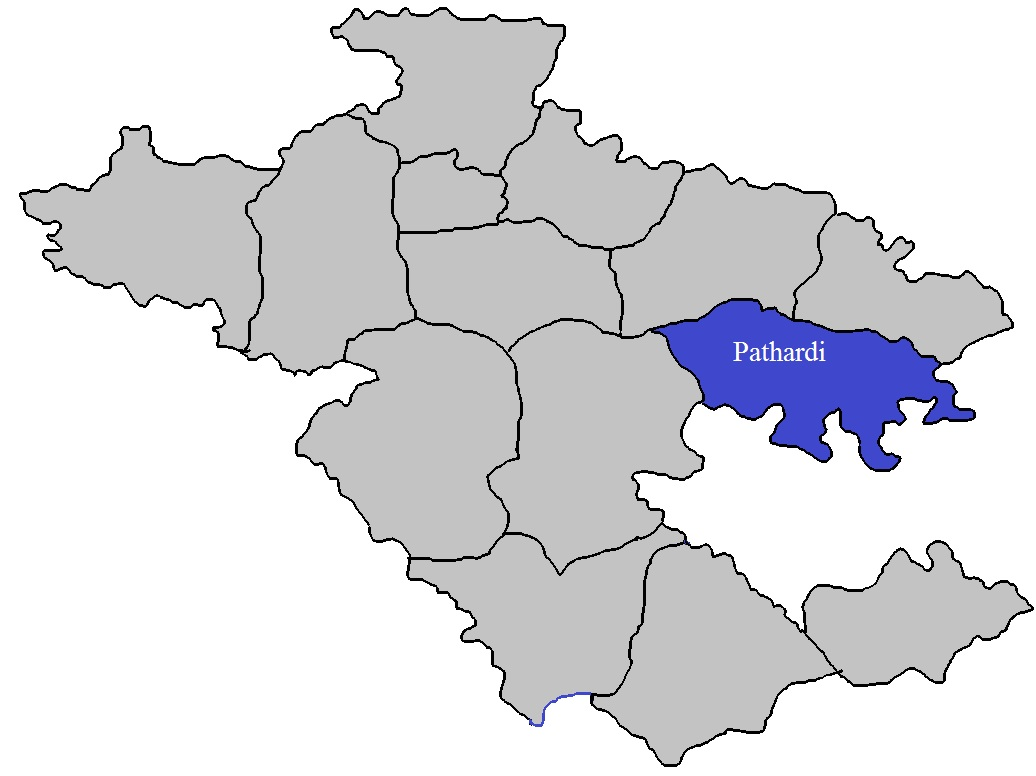
- Location of Pathardi in Ahmednagar district in Maharashtra
- Country: India
- State: Maharashtra
- District: Ahmednagar district
- Headquarters: Ahmednagar

Area
  - Total: 1,214.1 km^{2} (468.8 sq mi)

Population (2011)
  - Total: 258,109
  - Density: 212.59/km^{2} (550.61/sq mi)
- Website: http://www.pathardicity.in/

Pathardi taluka is a taluka in Ahmednagar subdivision of Ahmednagar district in Maharashtra state of India.

== Area ==
The table below shows area of the taluka by land type.

Type of Land	Area (km^{2})	% of Total Area
Agriculture	1013.47	83.48
Forest	64.26	5.29
Other	136.37	11.23
Total	1214.1	100

There are around 138 villages in Pathardi taluka. For list of villages see Villages in Pathardi taluka.

== Population ==
Religions in Pathardi taluk (2011)
Religion	Percent
Hinduism	92.94%
Islam	5.61%
Jainism	0.56%
Other or not stated	0.89%

Pathardi taluka has a population of 258,109 according to the 2011 census. Pathardi had a literacy rate of 74.74% and a sex ratio of 926 females per 1000 males. 27,211 (10.54%) lived in urban areas. Scheduled Castes and Scheduled Tribes make up 9.88% and 1.60% of the population respectively.

Languages of Pathardi taluk (2011)
1. Marathi (91.5%)
2. Hindi (3.72%)
3. Urdu (1.53%)
4. Lambadi (1.35%)
5. Others (1.92%)

At the time of the 2011 Census of India, 91.48% of the population in the district spoke Marathi, 3.72% Hindi, 1.53% Urdu and 1.35% Lambadi as their first language.

== Rain Fall ==
The table below details rainfall from year 1981 to 2004.

Year	Rainfall (mm)
1981	483
1982	346
1983	927.2
1984	351
1985	824
1986	318
1987	714
1988	807
1989	701
1990	716
1991	485
1992	434.5
1993	720
1994	571.6
1995	533
1996	932
1997	448
1998	1095
1999	360
2000	471
2001	332
2002	502
2003	476
2004	595

== See also ==
- Talukas in Ahmednagar district
- Villages in Pathardi taluka
  - MALEWADI
