= Rahata =

Village in Maharashtra

- city
- Location in Maharashtra, India Rahata (India)
- Coordinates: 19°43′N 74°29′E
- Country: India
- State: Maharashtra
- District: Ahmadnagar

Population (2001)
  - Total: 19,024

Languages
  - Official: Marathi
- Time zone: UTC+5:30 (IST)
- Postal code: 423107

Rahata is a city and a municipal council in Ahmadnagar district in the Indian state of Maharashtra.

== Demographics ==
As of the 2001 Indian census, there were 19,024 people residing in Rahata. Males constituted 51% of the population, with the remaining 49% being females. Rahta Pimplas has an average literacy rate of 72%, higher than the national average of 59.5%: male literacy is 79%, and female literacy is 65%. In Rahta Pimplas, 13% of the population is under 6 years of age.

== Location ==
Rahata is a town in Maharashtra, situated on the Nagar-Manmad road of National Highway 160. This town is 5 km south of the holy place Shirdi, while it is 21 km north of Bhagwatimata Temple, Kolhar (is considered to be the home of the three and a half shakti peethas). There are so many famous agriculture machinery manufacturers in Rahta. There is a temple of Lord Virbhadra also famous for its fair in this town.There is a village close to this town name Sakuri or Sakori, known for Shri Upasani Maharaj Ashram and Sati Godavari Mata's holy place where they lived.
