= Shirdi =

- Town
- Shri Sainagar Shirdi
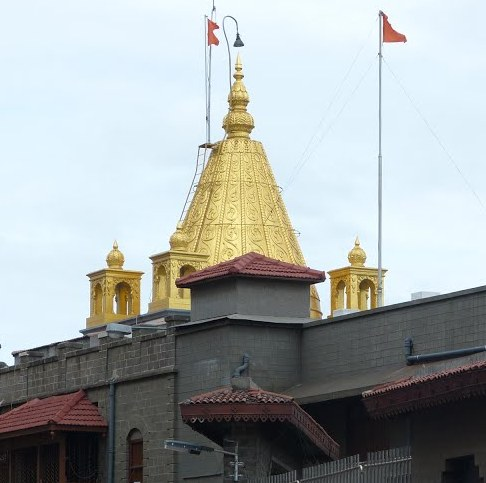
- Sai Baba's Samadhi Mandir in 2017
- Nickname: Sainagar
- Location within Maharashtra Location within India
- Coordinates: 19.77°N 74.48°E
- Country: India
- State: Maharashtra
- District: Ahilyanagar
- Taluka: Rahata

Government
  - Type: Municipal Council
  - Body: Shirdi Municipal Council
  - MP: Bhausaheb Rajaram Wakchaure, Shiv Sena (UBT)
  - MLA: Radhakrishna Vikhe Patil, BJP

Area
  - Total: 13 km^{2} (5.0 sq mi)
- Elevation: 504 m (1,654 ft)

Population (2011)
  - Total: 36,004
  - Density: 2,800/km^{2} (7,200/sq mi)

Languages
  - Official: Marathi
- Time zone: UTC+5:30 (IST)
- PIN: 423109
- Telephone code: 02423
- Vehicle registration: MH-17

Shirdi (also known as Sainagar) is a town and pilgrimage site in the Indian state of Maharashtra. Shirdi is located in the Rahata taluka of Ahilyanagar district. It is well known as the home of the 19th-century Indian saint Sai Baba.

== History ==
In the mid-1850s, a young Sai Baba arrived and settled in Shirdi, then a small village. Although he was initially denounced by the villagers as a madman, over the following decades, he became a prominent spiritual figure, drawing both Hindu and Muslim devotees from the surrounding areas. Following his death in 1918, his remains were placed in Buti Wada, which eventually grew to become what is known today as Sai Baba's Samadhi Mandir or Shirdi Sai Baba Temple.

== Demographics ==
As of the 2011 Indian census, the population of Shirdi stood at 36,004, with males comprising 53% and females comprising 47%. The town recorded an average literacy rate of 70%, with male literacy at 76% and female literacy at 62%. About 15% of residents were under six years of age. By 2023, the town received around 60,000 religious tourists each day.

== Transportation ==
=== Train ===
The Sainagar Shirdi railway station became operational in March 2009. As of 2011, there are trains from Chennai, Mumbai, Visakhapatnam, Kakinada, Vijayawada, Hyderabad, Mysore, among others.

=== Air ===
Shirdi Airport was inaugurated by then-president Ramnath Kovind on 1 October 2017. Major destinations from Shirdi Airport include the airports of Delhi, Hyderabad, Chennai, and Mumbai. The airport is located in Kakadi, in the Kopargaon tahsil area, 14 km southwest of Shirdi. The construction, according to the original plans, was completed in February 2016, and the first trial flight took place on 2 March 2016. In July 2019, the state government approved extending the runway from 2,500 metres (8,200 ft) to 3,200 metres (10,500 ft), building a new terminal to boost hourly passenger capacity from 300 to 1,000, and adding night-landing facilities.

The nearest major airports are at Aurangabad and Pune, 115 km (71 mi) and 186 km (116 mi) respectively, from Shirdi.

=== Road ===
Shirdi is accessible via National Highway 160, which runs through Maharashtra and Karnataka. Furthermore, the town is also accessible via State Highway 10, which runs south through Pune, Ahmednagar, Nashik, and Dhule districts.
