= Shrirampur =

Shrirampur Belapur
- city
- Location in Maharashtra, India Shrirampur (India)
- Coordinates: 19.619548°N 74.660339°E
- Country: India
- State: Maharashtra
- District: Ahmednagar

Government
  - MLA: Hemant Ogale

Area
  - Total: 10 km^{2} (3.9 sq mi)
- Elevation: 541 m (1,775 ft)

Population (2011)
  - Total: 89,282
  - Density: 8,900/km^{2} (23,000/sq mi)
- Demonym: Shrirampurkar (Marathi)

Languages
  - Official: Marathi
- Time zone: UTC+5:30 (IST)
- PIN: 413709
- Telephone code: 02422
- Vehicle registration: MH-17
- Sex ratio: 51%-49% ♂/♀
- Lok Sabha constituency: Shirdi
- Vidhan Sabha constituency: Shrirampur
- Website: shrirampurmc.gov.in

Shrirampur is a city and a municipal council located in the Ahmednagar district of the Indian state of Maharashtra.

== Climate ==
Shrirampur has a tropical wet and dry climate with average temperatures ranging between 20 and 42 °C (68 and 108 °F).

Shrirampur experiences three distinct seasons: Summer, Monsoon and Winter. Typical summer months are from March to May, with maximum temperatures ranging from 30 to 40 °C (86 to 104 °F). The warmest months in Shrirampur are April and May, the city often receives locally developed heavy thundershowers in the month of May (although humidity remains high). City experiences rise in atmospheric pressure in mid October when temperatures ranges from 35 to 40 °C (95 to 104 °F).

== Demographics ==
As of 2011 India census, Shrirampur had a population of 89,282. Males constituted 51% of the population and females 49%.Shrirampur has an average literacy rate of 72%, higher than the national average of 59.5%: male literacy is 79%, and female literacy 66%. In Shrirampur, 13% of the population is under 6 years of age. Shrirampur had sex ratio - 939

Year	Male	Female	Total Population	Change	Religion (%)							
Year	Male	Female	Total Population	Change	Hindu	Muslim	Christian	Sikhs	Buddhist	Jain	Other religions and persuasions	Religion not stated
2001	41355	39900	81255	-	69.683	21.835	1.903	1.399	1.325	3.440	0.209	0.206
2011	44842	44440	89282	0.099	67.018	24.482	1.537	1.585	1.425	3.441	0.224	0.289

== Electricity ==
The Mula Pravara Electric Co-operative Society Limited (MPECSL), Shrirampur was established in 1969, as one of the five pilot co-operative societies established in India as a rural electric co-operative Society. It used to distribute electricity in 183 villages spread over five talukas in the Ahmednagar district. Its consumer base was around 1.45 lakh consumers with sanctioned load of around 207 MW and MPECS receives power from Maharashtra.

Since 1977, it has defaulted on Maharashtra State Electricity Distribution Company Limited (MSEDCL)'s bills. It also refused to increase power tariff as directed by Maharashtra Electricity Regulatory Commission (MERC) in 2007. that resulted in dues to MSEDCL to staggering Rs 2300 crore. MERC has directed MPECS directors to hand over the entire power distribution system and associated assets, including offices, land, material and workshops to MSEDCL from zero hours on 1 February 2011. It can file an appeal before the commission to decide the transfer value of the assets. The society will also have to hand over all data in soft as well as hard format. It will also have to pay the security deposit amount collected from consumers.

== Notable people ==
The following are notable residents from Shrirampur:

- Ramrao Adik (1928 – 2007) politician and lawyer
- Zaheer Khan, Indian cricketer
- Annasaheb Shinde, agriculture minister for center
- Karamshi Jethabhai Somaiya, educationist
