= Shirdi Airport =

Airport in Maharashtra, India

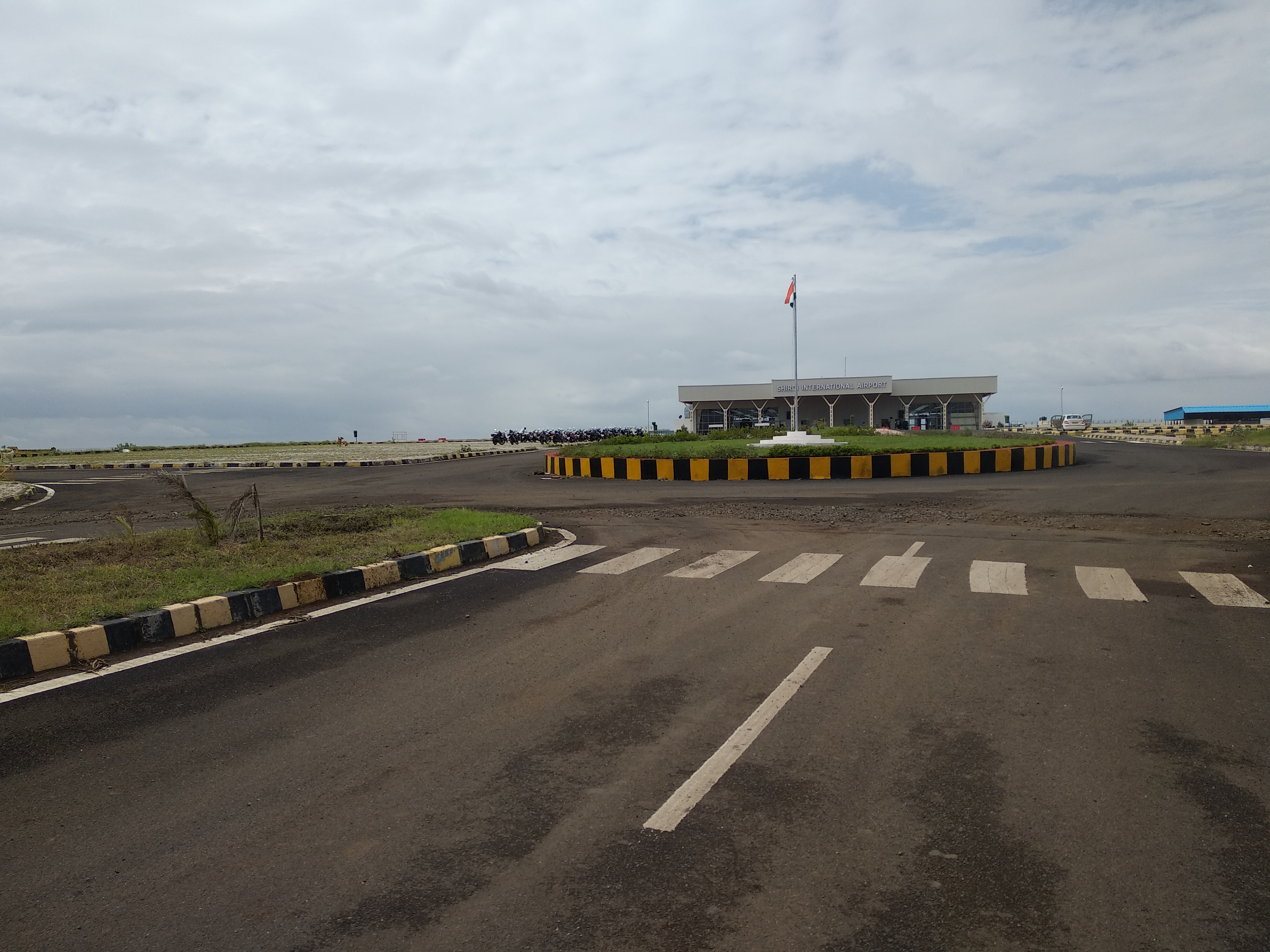
- Shirdi Airport
- IATA: SAG; ICAO: VASD

Summary
- Airport type: Public
- Owner: Maharashtra Airport Development Company
- Operator: Airports Authority of India
- Serves: Shirdi
- Location: Kakadi, Ahilyanagar district, Maharashtra, India
- Opened: 1 October 2017; 9 years ago
- Elevation AMSL: 1,909 ft (582 m)
- Coordinates: 19°41′19″N 074°22′44″E

Map
- Location within Maharashtra Location within India

Runways
Direction	Length		Surface
Direction	ft	m	Surface
09/27	8,200	2,500	Asphalt

Statistics (April 2025 – March 2026)
- Passengers: 6,05,913 (▼18.3%)
- Aircraft movements: 4,709 (▼30.7%)
- Cargo tonnage: 71.8 (▼24.8%)
- Source: AAI

Shirdi Airport (IATA: SAG, ICAO: VASD) is an international airport serving the town of Shirdi, Maharashtra, India. It is located at Kakadi, about 15 km (9.3 mi) southwest of the town. The airport was developed by the Maharashtra Airport Development Company and was inaugurated on 1 October 2017. The Air Traffic Control and operations of the airport are under the purview of the Airports Authority of India. The airport has a single 2,500 m (8,200 ft)-long runway.

== History ==
The Government of Maharashtra planned a greenfield airport at Shirdi, a town known for the temple of spiritual guru Sai Baba. The nearest existing airports at Aurangabad and Pune were located 125 km (78 mi) and 186 km (116 mi) from Shirdi respectively. The airport was planned at Kakadi, about 15 km (9.3 mi) southwest of the town. It was developed at a cost of ₹3.4 billion (US$35 million) by the Maharashtra Airport Development Company (MADC). The land acquisition for the airport was completed in December 2009, and the airport was expected to be planned by December 2011. The construction was delayed due to changes to the original plan, such as revising the runway length from 2,000 m (6,600 ft) to 3,200 m (10,500 ft), and floor plan for the terminal building. A smaller terminal building compared to the original plan, and a revised runway length of 2,500 m (8,200 ft) was finalised to save costs. The airport was planned to completed before the centenary celebrations of Sai Baba's samadhi in 2018.

The MADC completed the construction work by February 2016 and sought approvals from the Directorate General of Civil Aviation (DGCA) for an aerodrome licence to commence operation of commercial flights. The DGCA issued the licence on 21 September 2017, to operate aircraft based on Visual Flight Rules. The first aircraft, an ATR-72, operated by Alliance Air, landed at Shirdi airport on 26 September 2017. The airport was inaugurated for commercial operations on 1 October 2017 by the President of India.

== Infrastructure ==
The airport is spread over an area of 400 hectares (990 acres). It is equipped with a single 2,500 m (8,200 ft)-long runway capable of handling narrow body aircraft. The passenger terminal covers 2,750 m^{2} (29,600 sq ft) and has a capacity to handle about 500 passengers daily. In September 2019, a DVOR system was installed at the airport to enable aircraft to land in low visibility conditions. The state government also unveiled plans for the construction of a new terminal building.

== Airlines and destinations ==
Airlines	Destinations
IndiGo	Bengaluru, Chennai, Coimbatore, Delhi, Hyderabad

== Statistics ==
Passenger traffic at the airport has remained stable over the three-year period from 2022 to 2025, with annual volumes ranging between 0.73 to 0.75 million passengers.

Shirdi Airport passenger traffic (2025–2026)
Month	2025	2026	Change (%)
January	64,445	48,154	−25.3%
February	60,874	40,570	−33.4%
March	69,114	46,508	−32.7%
April	63,814	44,405	−30.4%
May	59,908	52,233	−12.8%
June	48,837	47,102	−3.6%
July	52,654	46,452	−11.8%
August	51,114	47,977	−6.1%
Total	470,760	373,301	−20.7%

== See also ==
- List of airports in Maharashtra
