= Rahata taluka =

- Tehsil
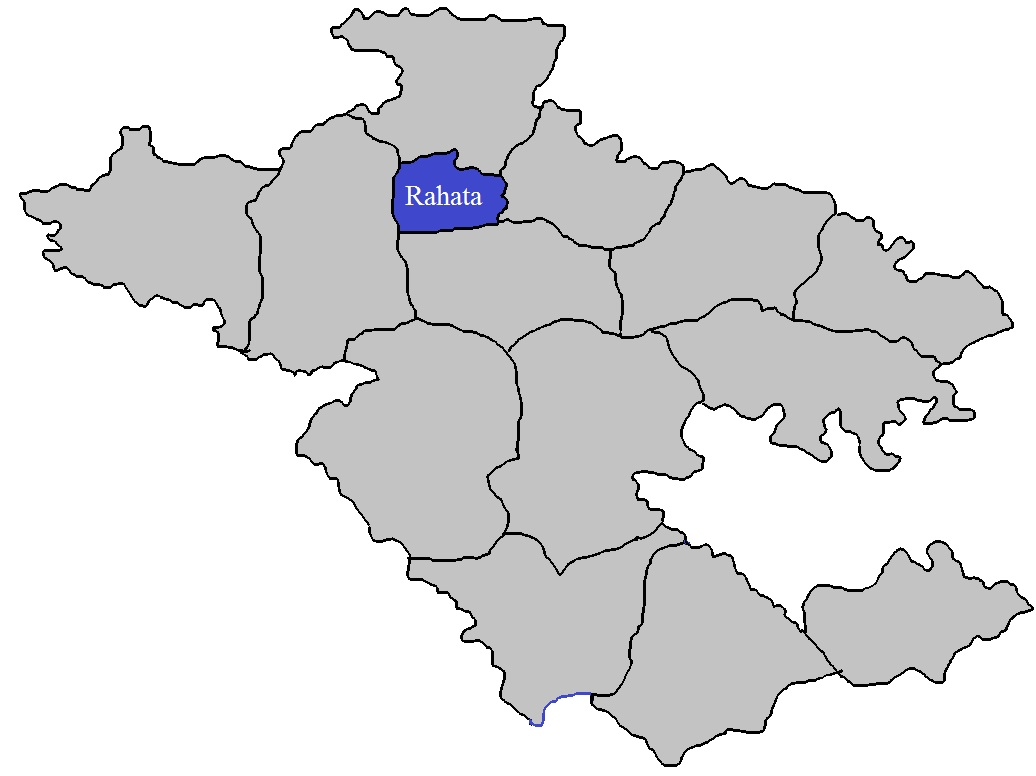
- Location of Rahata in Ahmednagar district in Maharashtra
- Country: India
- State: Maharashtra
- District: Ahmednagar district
- Headquarters: Rahata

Area
  - Total: 759.19 km^{2} (293.12 sq mi)

Population (2011)
  - Total: 320,485
  - Density: 422.14/km^{2} (1,093.3/sq mi)

Demographics
  - Literacy %: 68.16

Rahata taluka, is a taluka in Shrirampur subdivision of Ahmednagar district in Maharashtra State of India.

== Area ==
The table below shows area of the taluka by land type.

Type of Land	Area (km^{2})	% of Total Area
Agriculture	689.39	90.81
Forest	16.13	2.12
Other	53.67	7.07
Total	759.19	100

== Villages ==
There are around 60 villages in Rahata taluka. For list of villages see Villages in Rahata taluka.

== Population ==
Religions in Rahata taluk (2011)
Religion	Percent
Hinduism	88.48%
Islam	8.13%
Buddhism	0.91%
Jainism	0.85%
Christianity	0.59%
Other or not stated	1.04%

Rahata taluka has a population of 320,485 according to the 2011 census. Rahata had a literacy rate of 82.08% and a sex ratio of 940 females per 1000 males. 58,339 (18.20%) live in urban areas. Scheduled Castes and Scheduled Tribes make up 17.14% and 6.28% of the population respectively.

Languages of Rahata taluk (2011)
1. Marathi (87.9%)
2. Hindi (6.58%)
3. Urdu (2.36%)
4. Others (3.12%)

At the time of the 2011 Census of India, 87.94% of the population in the district spoke Marathi, 6.58% Hindi and 2.36% Urdu as their first language.

== Rain Fall ==
The Table below details of rainfall from year 1981 to 2004.

Year	Rainfall (mm)
2000	525
2001	413
2002	385
2003	249
2004	491

== See also ==
- Talukas in Ahmednagar district
- Villages in Rahata taluka
