= Sangram Arun Jagtap =

Indian politician

Member of Maharashtra Legislative Assembly
- Incumbent
- Assumed office 19 October 2014
- Preceded by: Anil Rathod
- Constituency: Ahmednagar City

Mayor & Member of Ahmednagar Municipal Corporation
- In office (2008-2011),(2013 – 2015)
- Preceded by: Sandeep Kotkar
- Succeeded by: Sheela Shinde; Abhishek Kalamkar

Personal details
- Born: 12 June 1985 (age 40) Ahmednagar, Maharashtra
- Party: Nationalist Congress Party
- Spouse: Shital Jagtap Kardile
- Parent: MLC Arunkaka Balbhimrao Jagtap (father)
- Education: B.Com., From New Arts Commerce & Science College, Ahmednagar. (2009)

Sangram Arun Jagtap is a member of Maharashtra Legislative Assembly. He represents the Ahmednagar City Assembly Constituency. He belongs to the Nationalist Congress Party.

On 22 March 2017, Jagtap was suspended along with 18 other MLAs until 31 December for interrupting Maharashtra Finance Minister Sudhir Mungantiwar during a state budget session and burning copies of the budget outside the assembly four days earlier.

On 7 April 2018 MLA Sangram Jagtap was among four held for murder of two Shiv Sena men in Maharashtra's Ahmednagar. Meanwhile, supporters of Jagtap allegedly vandalised the office of Ahmednagar superintendent of police after he was held in connection with the killings.

== Personal life ==
- Sangram Jagtap is the son-in-law of Rahuri, Ahmednagar MLA Shivaji Bhanudas Kardile.
