= Radhanath =

Radhanath may refer to:

- Radhanath Ray (1848–1908), Oriya poet
- Radhanath Sikdar (1813–1870), mathematician
- Radhanath Swami (born 1950), guru
