= Gaur Gopal Das =

Indian guru and motivational speaker

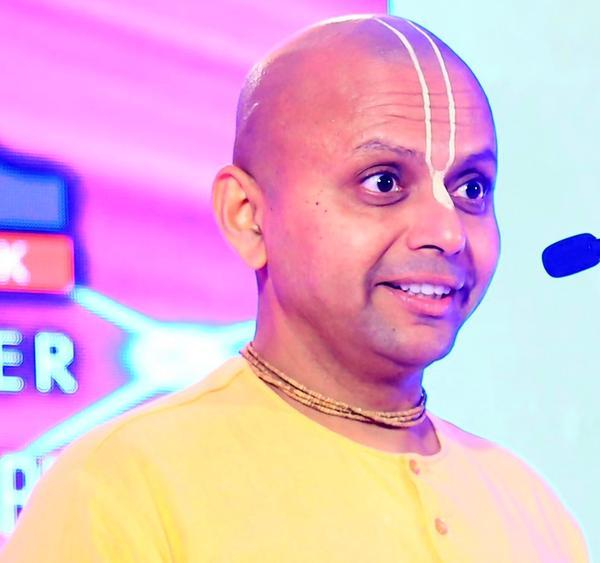
- Gaur Gopal Das at an Event in 2017

Personal life
- Born: 24 December 1973 (age 52) Vambori, Maharashtra, India
- Notable work(s): Life's Amazing Secrets: How to Find Balance and Purpose in Your Life; The Way of the Monk: The Four Steps to Peace, Purpose and Lasting Happiness
- Education: Cusrow Wadia Institute of Technology, Pune; College of Engineering, Pune
- Other name: Gaur Gopal Prabhu

Religious life
- Religion: Hinduism
- Temple: ISKCON
- Philosophy: Achintya Bheda Abheda
- Lineage: Brahma-Madhva-Gaudiya Sampradaya
- Sect: Vaishnavism (Gaudiya Vaishnavism)
- Initiation: Diksha: 1996

Religious career
- Teacher: Radhanath Swami
- Post: Brahmachari
- Period in office: 1996–present

Gaur Gopal Das (IAST: Gaura-Gopāla dāsa; born 24 December 1973) is an Indian monk, motivational speaker, and former electrical engineer. He is a member and preacher of the International Society for Krishna Consciousness (ISKCON).

== Early life and education ==
Gaur Gopal Das was born in a middle-class Marwari Jain family in Vambori, a town in the Ahilyanagar district of Maharashtra, India. He has a diploma in electrical engineering from Cusrow Wadia Institute of Technology, Pune and a degree from College of Engineering, Pune.

== Career ==
He worked as an electrical engineer at Hewlett Packard for a brief period, before leaving the company in 1996 to become a monk, joining the International Society for Krishna Consciousness (ISKCON), where he was given the name "Gaur Gopal Das". He has remained there for twenty-two years, learning ancient philosophy and contemporary psychology, to become a life coach.

After completing his education at ISKCON, he has been invited to several academic institutions and corporate firms in India and abroad over the past two years. He has spoken at the United Nations once and at the British Parliament three times. He has also spoken at several charity events to raise funds for social initiatives in education and rural development.

In 2018, he published the book Life's Amazing Secrets, and received an honorary doctorate by Kalinga Institute of Industrial Technology (KIIT). He collectively has over 17 million followers across his social media accounts.

== Published works ==
- Das, Gaur Gopal (1 January 2003). Revival
- Das, Gaur Gopal (8 October 2018). Life's Amazing Secrets: How to Find Balance and Purpose in Your Life. Penguin Random House India Private Limited. ISBN 978-93-5305-268-3.
- Das, Gaur Gopal (6 February 2020). The Way of the Monk: The Four Steps to Peace, Purpose and Lasting Happiness. Penguin Random House. ISBN 978-1-84604-625-4.
- Das, Gaur Gopal (17 January 2023). Energize Your Mind: A Monk's Guide to Mindful Living. Sourcebooks, Inc. ISBN 978-1-7282-6539-1.
- Das, Gaur Gopal (23 December 2025). You Can Have It All: Unlock the Secrets to a Great Life by Gaur Gopal Das. HarperCollins India. ISBN 978-9369891320.

== Awards and recognitions ==
In February 2023, Gaur Gopal Das received Asia's "Golden Book Awards" for his work on "Energize Your Mind: A Monk's Guide to Mindful Living".
