= Nimbhere =

Village in Maharashtra

- Town
- Location in Maharashtra, India
- Coordinates: 19.47°N 74.45°E
- Country: India
- State: Maharashtra
- District: Ahmednagar

Population (2011)
  - Total: 2,593

Languages
  - Official: Marathi
- Time zone: UTC+5:30 (IST)
- Postal code: 413711
- Vehicle registration: MH-17

Nimbhere is a village in the Ahmednagar District of Maharashtra, India. It is located in west of Rahuri taluka and bridge between two taluka as Rahuri and sangamner.

== About Nimbhere ==
According to Census 2011 information the location code or village code of Nimbhere village is 558174. Nimbhere village is located in Rahuri Tehsil of Ahmadnagar district in Maharashtra, India. It is situated 25 km away from sub-district headquarter Rahuri and 50 km away from district headquarter Ahmadnagar. As per 2009 stats, Nimbhere village is also a gram panchayat.

The total geographical area of village is 1398 hectares. Nimbhere has a total population of 2,593 peoples. There are about 512 houses in Nimbhere village. Rahuri is nearest town to Nimbhere which is approximately 25 km away.[1]
