= Ahmednagar City Assembly constituency =

Constituency of the Maharashtra legislative assembly in India

Coordinates: 19°6′8.46″N 74°45′0.84″E

- Constituency No. 225 for the Maharashtra Legislative Assembly

Constituency details
- Country: India
- Region: Western India
- State: Maharashtra
- District: Ahmednagar district
- Lok Sabha constituency: Ahmednagar
- Established: 1962
- Total electors: 317,397
- Reservation: None

Member of Legislative Assembly
- 15th Maharashtra Legislative Assembly
- Incumbent Sangram Arun Jagtap
- Party: NCP
- Alliance: NDA
- Elected year: 2024

Ahmednagar City Assembly constituency is one of the 288 Vidhan Sabha (Legislative Assembly) constituencies of Maharashtra state in Western India. This Assembly constituency is located in Ahmednagar district.

It is part of the Ahmednagar Lok Sabha constituency along with five other Vidhan Sabha segments, namely, Shevgaon, Rahuri, Parner, Shrigonda and Karjat Jamkhed.

== Members of Legislative Assembly ==
Year	Member	Party
Before 2008 : See Ahmednagar North & Ahmednagar South
2009	Anil Rathod	Shiv Sena
2014	Sangram Jagtap	Nationalist Congress Party
2019	Sangram Jagtap	Nationalist Congress Party
2024	Sangram Jagtap	Nationalist Congress Party

== Election results ==
=== Assembly Election 2024 ===
2024 Maharashtra Legislative Assembly election : Ahmednagar City
Party	Candidate	Votes	%	±%
NCP	Sangram Arun Jagtap	118,636	58.58%	New
NCP-SP	Abhishek Balasaheb Kalamkar	79,018	39.02%	New
NOTA	None of the Above	1,601	0.79%	▼0.84
Margin of victory		39,618	19.56%	▲12.91
Turnout		204,106	64.31%	▲5.99
Total valid votes		202,505		
Registered electors		317,397		▲9.59
NCP hold		Swing	▲10.08	

=== Assembly Election 2019 ===
2019 Maharashtra Legislative Assembly election : Ahmednagar City
Party	Candidate	Votes	%	±%
NCP	Sangram Arun Jagtap	81,217	48.51%	▲18.43
SS	Anil Rathod	70,078	41.86%	▲13.80
AIMIM	Asif Sultan	6,869	4.10%	New
BSP	Chhindam Shripad Shankar	2,923	1.75%	▲1.39
VBA	Kiran Gulabrao Kale	2,881	1.72%	New
NOTA	None of the Above	2,724	1.63%	New
CPI	Bahirnath Tukaram Wakale	1,046	0.62%	New
Margin of victory		11,139	6.65%	▲4.63
Turnout		170,339	58.81%	▼1.66
Total valid votes		167,427		
Registered electors		289,629		▲4.92
NCP hold		Swing	▲18.43	

=== Assembly Election 2014 ===
2014 Maharashtra Legislative Assembly election : Ahmednagar City
Party	Candidate	Votes	%	±%
NCP	Sangram Arun Jagtap	49,378	30.08%	New
SS	Anil Rathod	46,061	28.06%	▼21.19
BJP	Adv. Abhay Jagannath Agarkar	39,913	24.31%	New
INC	Tambe Satyajeet Sudhir	27,076	16.49%	▼2.92
NOTA	None of the Above	1,614	0.98%	New
Margin of victory		3,317	2.02%	▼27.82
Turnout		165,934	60.11%	▲9.96
Total valid votes		164,151		
Registered electors		276,045		▲3.11
NCP gain from SS		Swing	▼19.17	

=== Assembly Election 2009 ===
2009 Maharashtra Legislative Assembly election : Ahmednagar City
Party	Candidate	Votes	%	±%
SS	Anil Rathod	65,271	49.25%	New
INC	Gundecha Suvalal Anandram	25,726	19.41%	New
Independent	Agarkar Abhay Jagannath	17,781	13.42%	New
Independent	Shaikh Nazir Ahmed Alias Najju Pahelwan	8,660	6.53%	New
MNS	Daphal Sachin Chandrabhan	7,441	5.62%	New
RPI(A)	Ashok Vitthal Soanawane	4,155	3.14%	New
Margin of victory		39,545	29.84%	
Turnout		132,647	49.55%	
Total valid votes		132,519		
Registered electors		267,712		
SS win (new seat)				

== See also ==
- Ahmednagar
- List of constituencies of Maharashtra Vidhan Sabha
