= The Journey Home =

The Journey Home may refer to:

== Literature ==
- The Journey Home, a 1945 novel by Zelda Popkin
- The Journey Home, a 1977 book by Edward Abbey
- The Journey Home: Autobiography of an American Swami, a 2008 book by Radhanath Swami

== Film and television ==
- The Journey Home (1989 film), a Canadian drama short film
- The Journey Home (2014 film), a Canadian adventure film
- The Journey Home, a television show on EWTN Global Catholic Network
- The Journey Home, a Japanese CG-animated series produced by TMS Entertainment

== Music ==
- The Journey Home, a 2003 album by Colin Steele
- "The Journey Home", a song featured in the 2005 video game, Ace Combat 5: The Unsung War
- The Journey Home, a 2011 album by actor-singer Mark Evans
- A. R. Rahman Jai Ho Concert: The Journey Home World Tour, first concert tour of A. R. Rahman (2010-2011)
- "The Journey Home", a song by A. R. Rahman from the musical Bombay Dreams
- "The Journey Home", a song from the Sarah Brightman album Harem

== Other ==
- The Journey Home: Quest for the Throne, a 1993 video game

== See also ==
- Journey Home (disambiguation)
