= Wadgaon Gupta =

Village in Maharashtra

Wadgaon Gupta is a village in Ahmednagar district, near Ahmednagar city in India.The sina river flows through this village
