= Vambori =

Coordinates: 19°17′22″N 74°43′52″E

Vambori.
- Village
- Interactive map of Vambori.
- Country: India
- State: Maharashtra
- District: Ahilya Nagar
- Tehsil: Rahuri
- Founder: Government Of Maharashtra.

Government
  - Type: Gram panchayat
  - Body: (Vambori) Gram Panchayat

Population (2011)
  - Total: 19,213

Languages
  - Official: Marathi
- Time zone: UTC5:30 (IST)
- PIN: 413704
- Telephone code: 02426
- Vehicle registration: MH-17

Vambori or Wambori (Marathi: वांबोरी) is a Panchyat town located in Rahuri Tehsil and, fall under Ahilya Nagar district, Maharashtra State, India.

Vambori village falls under Rahuri assembly constituency, and Ahmednagar Lok Sabha constituency.

== Location and transportation ==
It is situated 19 km away from its sub-district Rahuri, 14 km Away From (M.P.K.V) Mahatma Phule Krishi Vidyapeeth and 25 km away from district Ahmednagar.

MSRTC buses are primary mode of transportation.

== Geographical area ==
The Total Geographical land area of Vambori is About 5425.97 hectares.

== Demographics ==
According to the 2011 Indian census, Vambori has a population of 19213 of which 9977 are males while 9236 are females as per Population Census 2011.

| Country | India |
| State | Maharashtra |
| District | Ahmednagar |
| Tehsil | Rahuri |
| Location | Vambori |
| Population as per(2019/2020) est. | 18,637 - 23,056 |
| Population(2011) | 19213 |
| Males | 9947 |
| Females | 9384 |
| Households | 3896 |
| Lat | 74.7307807 |
| Lng | 19.2896623 |

Vambori village slightly higher literacy rate compared to Maharashtra. literacy rate of Vambori village at 82.52% compared to 82.34% of Maharashtra.

== Local administration ==
The local administration of the village is handled by the Gram Panchayat, Vambori.

== Local hospital ==
The village of Wambori has a Government Rural Medical Hospital and a Government Veterinary Hospital.

== Places of interest ==
• Shree Khole shwar Mahadev Mandir. (Marathi : श्री खोलेश्वर महादेव मंदिर)

• Sri Pillay Swara Mahadev Temple ( Marathi : श्री पिलेश्वर (पंचमुखी) महादेव मंदिर ( Under the Dense Forest of Vambori Town Above the Hill this Five - Faced Lord Shiv Temple is Placed)

• Valmiki Tirth. ( Marathi : श्री क्षेत्र वाल्मीकि तीर्थ - This is the Ancient Pious Place where Rishi Valmiki visited and stayed here)

• Gorakhnath Temple ( Marathi : श्री चैतन्य गोरक्षनाथ मंदिर)

In Above Garbha Giri Hill Here is the Samadhi place of the main and second Guru of the Navnath sect, Shri Guru Gorakhnath.

• Shri Krishna Mahanubhava Panth Temple and Ashram ( Marathi : श्रीकृष्ण महानुभव पंथ मंदिर आणि आश्रम)

Shri Chakradhar Swami, the founder of the Mahanubhava sect had visited this village.

• Old Gram Devta Jagdamba And Dev Khandoba Temple.

• Malaganga Temple.

== Local schools ==
• Mahesh Munot Secondary and Higher College.

• Kanya secondary and higher College.

• Zilla Parishad Boys School. (Government Aided)

• Zilla Parishad Girls School. (Government Aided)

== Notable people ==
• Indian guru shri Gaur Gopal Das ji, an internationally renowned motivational speaker and a well-known monk of ISKCON organization, was born in Vambori village.
