= Shivaji Bhanudas Kardile =

Indian politician and murderer (1958–2025)

Member of Maharashtra Legislative Assembly
- In office (2009-2014), (2014-2019), (2024 – 2025)
- Preceded by: Chandrashekhar Kadam
- Succeeded by: Akshay Shivaji Kardile
- Constituency: Rahuri
- In office (1995-1999), (1999-2004), (2004 – 2009)
- Preceded by: Maruti alias Dada Patil Shelke
- Constituency: Ahmednagar North

Personal details
- Born: Shivaji Bhanudas Kardile; 4 December 1958 Rahuri, Ahmednagar district.
- Died: 17 October 2025 (aged 66) Ahilyanagar, Maharashtra, India
- Party: Bharatiya Janata Party (2009-2025)
- Other political affiliations: Nationalist Congress Party (2004-2009); Independent (1995-2004); Indian National Congress (1984-1995)
- Children: Akshay Shivaji Kardile; Suvarna Sandeep Kotkar; Shital Sangram Jagtap; Jyoti Amol Gade

Shivaji Bhanudas Kardile (4 December 1958 – 17 October 2025) was an Indian politician who was six-time Member of Legislative Assembly of Rahuri and Ahmednagar North Vidhan sabha of Maharashtra and owned a dairy business before he entered politics.

== Early life ==
Kardile was born on 4 December 1958. He studied at secondary school and left education after that.

== Arrest ==
In 2018, Kardile was arrested by Ahmednagar police in connection to the killings of Shiv Sena leaders Sanjay Kotkar and Vasant Thube.

== Career ==
He was a grassroots worker of Congress party, active in local politics and served as Sarpanch of Burhanpur (also spelled Burhannagar), Ahmednagar District from (1984–1995). He started his public life as Sarpanch and gradually grew into a leader in the cooperative and state political sectors of Ahmednagar.

In 1995, he contested Ahmednagar North (Nagar–Nevasa) as an independent candidate and won with 62,552 votes. BJP–Shiv Sena supported his candidacy, but he was officially an independent.

In 1999, he again contested from Ahmednagar North (Nagar–Nevasa) and won as an independent candidate, with 63,576 votes. He was again supported by the BJP–Shiv Sena alliance.

In 2004 he joined the Nationalist Congress Party led by Sharad Pawar and contested the 2004 Assembly election on an NCP ticket and won Ahmednagar North Assembly constituency with 76,436 votes.

In 2009 he joined BJP after NCP did not give him the expected nomination after differences over the ticket. He contested Rahuri–Nagar–Pathardi Constituency on the BJP ticket and won.

In 2014 he remained with BJP and won again from Rahuri–Nagar–Pathardi Constituency in 2014 and 2024 election. He lost in 2019, defeated by NCP candidate Prajakt Tanpure.

== Personal life ==
Kardile had four daughters and a son. His son-in-law is MLA Sangram Jagtap, Sandeep Kotkar is a former mayor of Ahmednagar, Jyoti Amol Gade is the current mayor of Ahilyanagar, and his son Akshay Shivaji Kardile is the current MLA of Rahuri Assembly constituency.

== Death ==
Kardile died from cardiac arrest on 17 October 2025, at age 66. His son Akshay Shivaji Kardile won the bypoll for Rahuri Assembly constituency by more than 1,12,587 votes.
