= Ghorpadwadi =

Village in Maharashtra, India

Ghorpadwadi is a village in Rahuri Taluka in Ahmednagar district of Maharashtra State, India. It belongs to Khandesh, the Northern Maharashtra region and the Nashik division. It is located 39 km towards North from District headquarters Ahmednagar. 11 km from Rahuri Khurd. 217 km from State capital Mumbai.
