= Baba Rampuri =

American Hindu monk

- Born: William A. Gans; July 14, 1950 (age 76); Chicago, United States
- Occupations: Naga Sadhu, author, teacher, lecturer, philosopher
- Years active: 1969–present
- Website: rampuri.com

Baba Rampuri, born William A. Gans (July 14, 1950) is an American born Sadhu. He claims to be the first westerner to become a Naga Sadhu, having been initiated in 1970. He is the author of the 2010 Destiny Books published book Autobiography of a Sadhu: A Journey into Mystic India, originally published in 2005 by Harmony/Bell Tower as Baba: Autobiography of a Blue-Eyed Yogi, and now released by Amarpuri Wellness in 2016 as Autobiography of a Sadhu: An Angrez among Naga Babas which has also been translated into German, Russian, Czech, Croatian, and Serbian. He was initiated into the religious order the Naga Sannyasis after traveling to India on a spiritual quest from his native California in 1969, at the age of 18. Like many Sadhus, he has stopped using his birth name since his initiation, refuses to give it, and is unwilling to talk about his past. He is Shri Mahant at Shri Panch Dashnam Juna Akhara (The Sacred Juna Akhara of the Ten Names).

== Background ==
Baba Rampuri was born William A. Gans on July 14, 1950 in Chicago where his father was a dental surgeon, possibly Jewish. His family moved to Beverly Hills, California in 1953.

=== 1960s and 1970s ===
In 1969, at the age of 18, after experimenting with psychedelics, and viewed as a dropout, Gans left his prosperous family and headed for India to find himself, and as a spiritual quest. Although he returned to the United States after this visit, he went back to India in 1971 and has not returned to his native country. He claims to be the first foreigner to be initiated into India’s ancient order of yogis and shamans, the Naga Sannyasis, during the Allahabad Maha Kumbh Mela in 1971. His guru is Swami Hari Puri Ji, son of Pir Sandhya Puri Ji), also known as Hari Puri Baba Ji, Baba Ji, and Guru Ji.

=== 1980s ===
In 1984 he founded the Hari Puri Ashram in the Himalayan foothill town of Hardwar. He divides his time between his ashram in Hardwar, Ujjain, and Goa.

=== 2000s ===
In 2004 he was admitted to the Council of Elders of Datt Akhara in Ujjain, Central India, and has become the special envoy of its Pir (usually the title of a Muslim Sufi leader, but it is also the title of the abbot of Datt Akhara in Ujjain.

He hosts an international camp at the Kumbh Mela (the most recent being the Ardh Kumbh Mela in Allahabad, 2007), as well as retreats, teachings, and initiations in India, and abroad.

In 2007 he was part of the documentary "India Trip" by film-director Lev Victorov (Moscow).

=== 2010s ===
At the 2010 Kumbh Mela in Haridwar Rampuri was honored with a permanent seat in the Juna Akhara Council and given the title Antahrashtriya (trans. 'International') Mandal (trans. 'World Circle') ka Shri Mahant.

He was interviewed in the 2013 National Geographic documentary on the Kumbh Mela.

He now runs, along with his children, the Baba Rampuri Cultural Foundation Inc. located in Brooklyn, New York, created in January 2013.

On August 11, 2017 Rampuri featured in an episode titled Dear India from the Chelsea late-night talk show.

== Rampuri v. Stern ==
Rampuri says Edwin S. Stern approached him in September 2010, and asked him to secure the commitment of the Shri Panch Dashnam Juna Akhara religious society in a spiritual "Kumbha Mela" event to be held in 2012 in New York City. The planned event was cancelled by Stern in August 2011 due to an inability to secure sufficient funding. A court case subsequently ensued.

Rampuri's claim for a $250,000 plus expenses Agent Fee for his assistance in securing the Juna Akhara's participation and a further $1,325,967 that was promised by Stern and his company as a Dakshina (donation) to Juna Akhara itself, was dismissed by the New York Supreme Court on January 15, 2013.

== Written works ==
Rampuri's Autobiography of a Sadhu: A Journey into Mystic India was first published in English in 2005 (as Baba: Autobiography of a Blue-Eyed Yogi) and translated into Russian in 2006 and German in 2008, with an updated republication in English in 2010.

Published in English as:

- Rampuri. (2010). 'Autobiography of a Sadhu: A Journey into Mystic India'. Destiny Books. ISBN 978-1594773303. – originally published as Rampuri. (2005). Baba: Autobiography of a Blue-Eyed Yogi. Harmony/Bell Tower. ISBN 978-1400080380.

Published in German as:

- Rampuri. (2008). 'Unterwegs zu den Wurzeln yogischen Wissens' (On the Road to the Roots of Yogic Knowledge/Heading to the Roots of Yogic Knowledge). Sphinx. ISBN 978-3720590112.

Published in Russian as:

- Rampuri. (2006). 'Биография голубоглазого йогина' (Autobiography of a Blue-Eyed Yogi). Гаятри (Gayatri). ISBN 5-9689-0040-7. and translated by А. Горбатюк (A. Gorbatyuk)

== See also ==
- Radhanath Swami
