= Sai Baba =

Sai Baba or Saibaba (Hindi: साईं sāĩ, "Swami", and बाबा bābā, "Baba") is an honorific term for ascetics in India. It may refer to:

== People ==
- Sai Baba of Shirdi (c. 1838–1918), Indian guru
- Sathya Sai Baba (1926–2011), born Sathya Narayana Raju, Indian guru
- G. N. Saibaba (1967–2024), Indian scholar and activist

== Religion ==
- Sathya Sai Baba movement

== Media ==
- Shirdi Ke Sai Baba, a 1977 Indian film
- Sai Baba (TV series), a 2005 Indian TV series
- Mere Sai – Shraddha Aur Saburi, a 2017 Indian TV series
