= Prajakt Tanpure =

Indian politician

Prajakt Prasadrao Tanpure

Member of Maharashtra Legislative Council
- Incumbent
- Assumed office 22 June 2026
- Preceded by: Arunkaka Jagtap
- Constituency: Ahmednagar Local Authorities

Minister of State Government of Maharashtra
- In office 30 December 2019 – 29 June 2022
- Minister: Urban Development.; Energy; Tribal Development; Higher Education and Technical Education; Disaster Management; Relief and Rehabilitation; Revenue; Medical Education.; Textiles
- Governor: Bhagat Singh Koshyari
- Chief Minister: Uddhav Thackeray
- Deputy CM: Ajit Pawar

Member of Maharashtra Legislative Assembly
- In office (2019–2024)
- Preceded by: Shivaji Bhanudas Kardile
- Succeeded by: Shivaji Bhanudas Kardile
- Constituency: Rahuri

Personal details
- Born: 13 September 1976 (age 50) At.Rahuri, Dist.Ahmednagar district
- Party: Bharatiya Janata Party (May 2026–Present)
- Other political affiliations: Nationalist Congress Party (Until 2026)
- Spouse: Smt. Sonali Prajakt Tanpure
- Parents: Prasad alias Bapusaheb Tanpure (father); Smt. Usha Prasad Tanpure (mother)
- Education: Post Graduate – M.S. From University of Tulsa, Oklahoma, United States of America, Year-2003 & B.E. Mechanical From Pune University Year 2000
- Occupation: Farmer and businessman

Prajakt Prasadrao Tanpure (born 13 September 1976) is an Indian politician from the state of Maharashtra. Prajakt Tanpure was elected as member of the 14th Maharashtra Legislative Assembly in Vidhan Sabha Elections 2019. He represents the Rahuri-Nagar- Pathardi constituency from 2019 to 2024. He joined the Bharatiya Janata Party in 2026.

== Personal life ==
He is the nephew of former minister in the Maharashtra government and senior Nationalist Congress Party leader Jayant Patil.
