= Radhanath Swami =

American Gaudiya Vaishnava guru

His Holiness Radhanath Swami
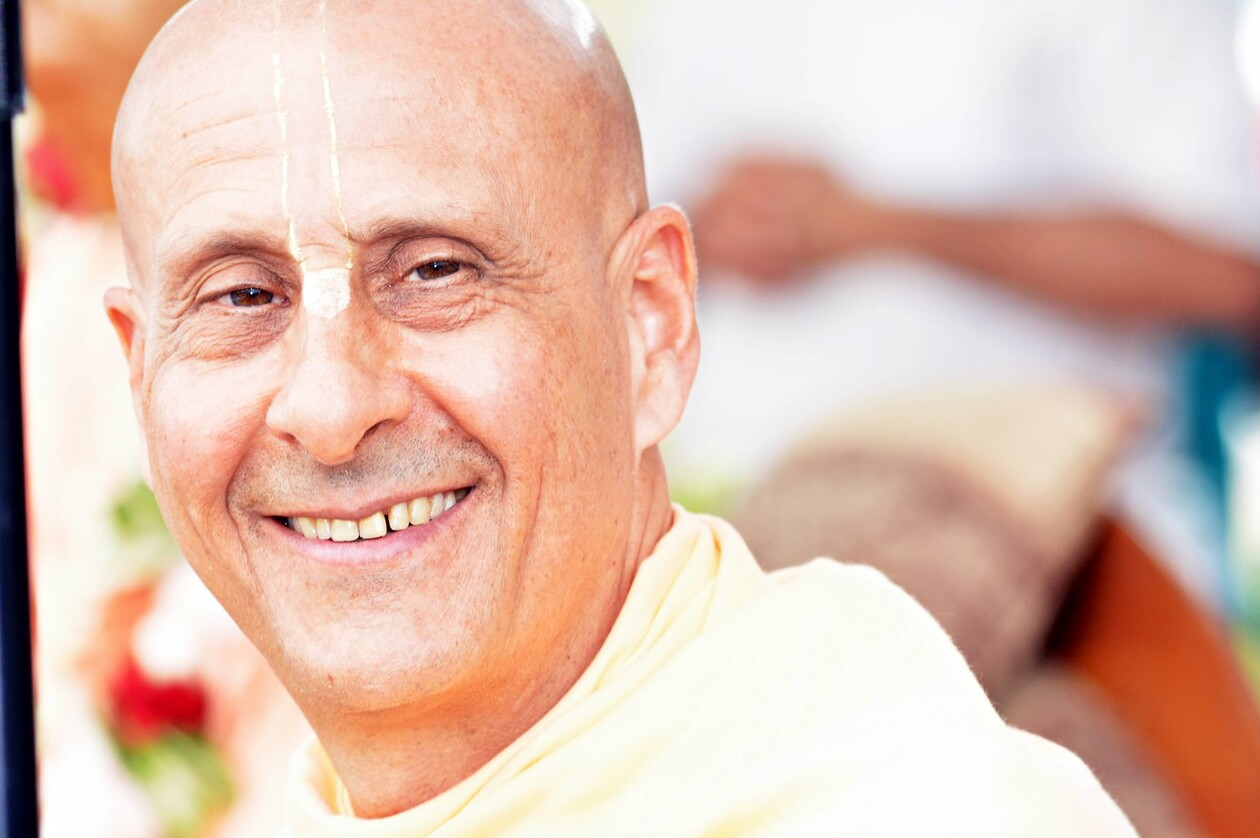
- Radhanath Swami

Personal life
- Born: Richard Slavin; 7 December 1950 (age 75) Chicago, Illinois, United States
- Website: www.radhanathswami.com

Religious life
- Religion: Sanātana-dharma (Hinduism)
- Order: Sannyasa
- Philosophy: Achintya Bheda Abheda; Bhakti yoga
- Sect: Gaudiya Vaishnavism
- Initiation: Diksa–1973 by A. C. Bhaktivedanta Swami Prabhupada, Sannyasa–1982 by Kirtanananda Swami

Senior posting
- Post: GBC–1994
- Predecessor: A. C. Bhaktivedanta Swami Prabhupada

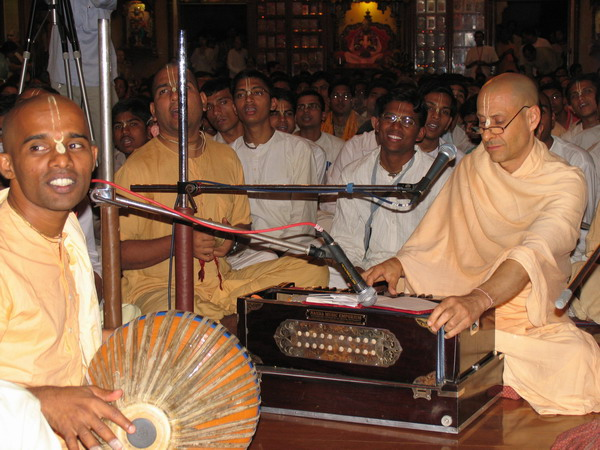
Singing kirtan at Radha Gopinath Temple.

Radhanath Swami (IAST: Rādhānātha Svāmī) (born 7 December 1950) is a Gaudiya Vaishnava guru and author. He has been a Bhakti Yoga practitioner and a spiritual teacher for more than 50 years. He is the inspiration behind ISKCON's free midday meal for 1.2 million school kids across India, and he has been instrumental in founding the Bhaktivedanta Hospital in Mumbai. He works largely from Mumbai and travels extensively throughout Europe and America. In the International Society for Krishna Consciousness (ISKCON), he serves as a member of the Governing Body Commission. Steven J. Rosen described Radhanath Swami as a "saintly person respected by the mass of ISKCON devotees today."

== Biography ==
=== 1950-1970: The Early Years ===
Richard Slavin (Yiddish: ריטשארד סלאווין) was born on 7 December 1950 in Chicago to Idelle and Gerald Slavin, children of Jewish immigrants from Russia, Lithuania, Poland, and Romania. He is of Ashkenazi Jewish descent. In 1955, he and his family moved to a suburb of Chicago – Highland Park. In 1958, his father opened a dealership selling Edsel cars, which did not succeed; however, the car repair shop launched thereafter was quite successful. Despite being well off, at age 15 Richard chose to work, hoping to contribute to his family.

As a child, Richard showed a tendency that he later called "the traces of my past lives". He did not prefer eating at the table, but seated on the floor, as is customary in India. When his parents forbade him to do so, he began to eat at the table standing. He hated the sight of meat and eggs, nauseated at their sight, and often vomited after eating meat, something that took him several years to get accustomed to. From an early age, Richard realized that the materialistic way of life would never satisfy him, and was attracted by poverty and simplicity.

Although his parents were not religious, Richard developed an interest in religion and spiritual themes from his early years. At age 13, he passed the rite of bar mitzvah (a Jewish coming of age ritual) and received instructions from the local rabbi about how to pray. On his 13th birthday, his elder brother Marty gifted him the debut album of folk-singing trio Peter, Paul and Mary. who in their compositions opposed war and social injustice, but Richard was particularly impressed by their compositions about God.

In 1965, Richard entered Deerfield High School, where he excelled in his studies and made many friends. He was passionate about wrestling, ending up on his school's team and won majority of fights. However, on dislocating his shoulder in a major competition, he decided to quit the sport. In his spare time, along with a couple of friends, he washed cars. Dissatisfied with the conditions of African Americans and opposing the Vietnam War, he embraced the ideologies of Martin Luther King.

The death of one of his close friends (aged 16) in a car accident made Richard think seriously about the meaning of life. At the same time, following the example of some of his peers, he plunged into the hippie counterculture. Keen to understand the meaning of life, he grew his hair and started smoking. In the summer of 1968, a sense of adventure led him to hitchhike journey to California., where he spent the nights on the beaches and visited the then-hippie mecca of Haight-Ashbury district in San Francisco.

In 1969, Richard enrolled in Miami Dade College, where, in search of spiritual experience, he resorted to books on religion and philosophy. Disillusioned with the materialistic values of Americans, Richard studied hard in college. He questioned the "goodness of American life" in which he'd been taught to believe. After reading several books on Eastern spirituality, he began to practice meditation. On listening to a lecture on transcendental meditation, he chanted the sacred syllable "Om" with greater conviction. While this practice did not satisfy him, it helped him realize the need to find a bona fide guru.

In the summer of 1970, after the end of his first year in college, Richard attended a rock festival on Randalls Island that included performances by Jimi Hendrix and other famous musicians and bands of the time. There, Richard met the Hare Krishnas, who gave him a pamphlet with photos of A. C. Bhaktivedanta Swami Prabhupada. That summer, Richard dropped out of college and along with a couple of friends, embarked on a trip to Europe. (Note: In his autobiography, Radhanath Swami mentions that before going to Europe, he visited his parents in Chicago. On his flight back to New York, his neighbouring passenger turned out to be blues singer Johnny Winter. During the flight, they sang along to the accompaniment of harmonica Junior Parker's "Mother-in-Law Blues".)

=== 1970: From Europe to India ===
Richard travelled to Europe with his childhood friend Gary Liss. Penniless, they stayed with anyone who would take them in, and often survived on just bread and cheese. To cover basic expenses, Richard played the harmonica on the street and collected alms. In Amsterdam, Richard met Hare Krishnas once again and spent some time in a commune. In England, he attended the rock festival Isle of Wight on the Isle of Wight on 30 August 1970, witnessing one of Jimi Hendrix's last performances.

During his travels, Richard read books on Eastern spirituality and the Bible that he had brought from America. He loved to visit churches and monasteries, and never missed an opportunity to talk with the priests and monks. In Rome, Richard met with Franciscan friars, with whom he had a long conversation about Jesus and the relationship between Christianity and Judaism. Richard and Gary also attended the speech of the pope in the Vatican. They saw the Catholic monks meditating in the catacombs of the monastery, among the skeletons of their predecessors and heard from one of them of the frailty of the material body. After parting from Gary for a while, Richard made a pilgrimage to Assisi, visiting places associated with the life of the great Catholic saint Francis of Assisi.

In Athens, Richard and Gary first made their living by donating blood, and then, together with a Swiss violinist and French guitarist, playing music and collecting alms on the street. After the police forbade them to do so and confiscated their earnings, Richard and Gary went to Crete, where Richard lived in a cave by the sea. By that time, Richard had little interest in the carefree way of life and ideals of the hippies; he was increasingly drawn to spiritual life.

One morning, while meditating and praying on top of a rock, Richard heard an inner voice that urged him to go to India. On the same morning, the inner voice directed Gary to Israel. After parting with Gary, Richard hit the road. with neither money nor a travel plan, but he firmly believed that by hitchhiking eastward, he could get to the country that had answers to his prayers.

Having met two hippies in Athens who were also Eastward bound, Richard joined them in going to India by the (then-popular among the hippie) route through Turkey, Iran, Afghanistan, and Pakistan. In Turkey, they encountered great difficulty, as there was a raging cholera epidemic. After a narrow escape from bandits in Istanbul, they continued by bus through Ankara to the border with Iran. They arrived in Tehran during Ramadan. As Richard had developed an interest in Islam, he parted with his friends and stayed for a few days in Mashhad, an important place of pilgrimage for Shia Muslims. In the mausoleum of Imam Reza, Richard met an English-speaking Muslim, who explained the basics of Islam and Muslim customs.

Upon arrival in Afghanistan, Richard spent a few days in Herat, where a poor family sheltered him. Here, Richard experienced his first culture shock: observing the Afghans happy, despite miserable poverty. Upon arrival in Kandahar, Richard met a blind boy who spent long hours singing songs about the love of God on the street. To Richard, this boy seemed the happiest person he had ever met. This meeting left a deep impression on Richard and made him reflect on the nature of happiness. In Kandahar, Richard also experienced the most powerful narcotic experience in his life, prompting him to vow never to take drugs. In Kabul, a young Dutch woman tried to seduce him and even tried to force him to indulge in sex. As sex seemed inconsistent with a spiritual quest, Richard rejected her advances, vowing to remain celibate.

=== 1970-1972: India – In search of a guru ===
In India, Richard arrived in December 1970. Watching cows freely walking around in Delhi, he felt an aversion to meat and became a vegetarian. In Delhi, Richard took part in the "World Conference of Yoga", which gathered more than 800 gurus, yogis, sages and pundits. Richard met with renowned yogi, founder of the Himalayan Institute, Swami Rama. When Richard asked him for blessings, Swami Rama replied that Richard's spiritual progress will continue to be based on communion with saintly persons, who will help him to overcome all obstacles in the spiritual path.

Richard also met Swami Satchidananda – a known disciple of Swami Sivananda. Swami Satchidananda explained to him the basic meaning of yoga and urged him not to look for shortcomings in others, and to always focus on the good qualities. Satchidananda blessed Richard that he may "discover the treasure of his heart". Richard also attended a series of lectures by Indian guru and philosopher Jiddu Krishnamurti, who was known for being able to answer any question and to crush any argument. From Krishnamurti, Richard learned that spiritual life cannot be superficial, as being attached to external things and rituals, people often forget the main purpose of spiritual practice – the cleansing of one's heart.

The last day of the conference was held in Vigyan Bhavana – the largest concert hall in New Delhi. The event brought together more than 3,000 people. The conference ended with the gurus fighting over the microphone, so they could convince the audience that their path was the best.

In January 1971, Richard went to the Himalayas in search of a guru. Upon arrival in Rishikesh, he stopped for a few days in the "Divine Life Society" – an ashram, founded by Swami Sivananda. Richard spoke at length with Sivananda's student, Swami Chidananda, who led the ashram after the death of his guru. Chidananda convinced Richard of the need to practice japa meditation – chanting mantras on rosary.

In his 1980s interview to Larry D. Shinn, Radhanath Swami recounted that he found a secluded spot on the banks of the Ganges and chanted "Hare Krishna" and other mantras for eight to ten hours a day. There he met a sadhu, at whose request he threw all his western clothes in the waters of the Ganges, and received in return a simple garment of a Hindu ascetic. Richard began to practice severe austerities: Every day for a month, from sunrise to sunset, he meditated sitting on a rock in the middle of the Ganges. He only ate raw vegetables, fruits and nuts. Later Richard became acquainted with another sadhu who taught him new techniques of meditation.

Unable to find a guru in the Himalayas, Richard continued to wander in India. For a while, he lived among the Advaitins in Varanasi and among Buddhist monks in Bodh Gaya – the place where Buddha attained enlightenment. Upon arrival in Bombay, Richard saw a poster announcing a series of festivals by the American Hare Krishna devotees and their spiritual master A. C. Bhaktivedanta Swami Prabhupada. Out of curiosity, Richard went to the Hare Krishna program the same evening, where he heard Prabhupada for the first time. Prabhupada's lectures made a big impression on Richard. The Hare Krishnas strongly preached to their hippie countryman, but Richard was not yet ready to listen to them. "He believed that all paths lead to God and did not understand the need to particularly follow Prabhupada and his followers".

After parting with the Hare Krishna devotees, Richard continued his wanderings in India, travelling "from ashram to ashram and guru to guru". Few months later, he was in Mathura – a holy site for Vaishnavas – where according to legends, Krishna was born. The day of his arrival in the city coincided with the birth anniversary of Krishna – Krishna Janmashtami. At the time, Richard lived in Vrindavan, close to Mathura, where Hindus believe Krishna spent his childhood. In Vrindavan, Richard stayed in the ashram of the famous Hare Krishna guru and Prabhupada's godbrother Swami Bon, who affectionately named him Ratheen Krishna Das. By that time, Richard looked like a real Indian hermit with his body skinny from poor nutrition and dreadlocks on his head.

A few months later, Prabhupada came to Vrindavan with a group of American students. Listening to a lecture of the Hare Krishna guru, Richard concluded that the Gaudiya Vaishnava philosophy was the most perfect and that Prabhupada was a person, who truly loved God. The sight of Prabhupada singing Bengali bhajans with strong religious feelings left a strong impression on Richard. In his heart, Richard felt that Prabhupada was the greatest of all gurus and saints he met during all his wanderings in India., Prabhupada answered all of Richard's questions, backing up each answer with scriptural quotations. Richard also felt that Prabhupada walked his talk. However, Richard decided not to join Krishna at that time and remained in Vrindavan after the departure of Prabhupada and his disciples.

=== 1972-1973: Back to America, Initiation ===
In the spring of 1972, the Indian government refused to extend Richard's visa, forcing him to return to America. After spending a few weeks in a Krishna temple in Amsterdam and the Radha Krishna Temple in London, Richard returned to his parents, who by then had moved from Chicago to Miami. Soon, he again came into contact with the Hare Krishnas and went to New York, where he met Prabhupada, who was in town for a few days en route to India. Richard wanted to go back to India, but Prabhupada asked him to stay in America and assist in the development of the New Vrindaban community, under the guidance of Kirtanananda Swami. Richard followed Prabhupada's counsel and settled in New Vrindaban, caring for cows and reading Prabhupada's books in his spare time. Convinced by the philosophy outlined in the books and personal examples of those living in the New Vrindaban community, Richard finally decided to accept Prabhupada as his guru. On 11 February 1973 he accepted initiation from Prabhupada.

=== 1973-1993: New Vrindaban ===
For the next six years, Radhanath never left New Vrindaban, contributing to developing the community. Radhanath Swami later recalled that at the time, life in the community was very austere. In cold winters, the community members carried out without heating and hot water. Radhanath followed the Hare Krishna spiritual practices, grazed cows and served the temple deities. On 1 August 1976 he received from Prabhupada brahminic initiation.

In the first half of the 1980s, Radhanath lectured at several universities in Ohio and Pennsylvania, and conducted courses on vegetarian cooking. In early 1982, a community leader – Kirtanananda Swami – offered Radhanath to take sannyasa (the way of life of renunciation). The sannyasa initiation ceremony was held in May 1982 in New Vrindaban. On accepting the vows of lifelong renunciation, Radhanath received the title of "swami", and since then is known as "Radhanath Swami". In 1983, for the first time after many years, Radhanath Swami made a pilgrimage to India, where he met some of his old friends. In 1986 Radhanath Swami established the Radha Gopinath Temple in Bombay.

In 1987, Kirtanananda Swami was expelled from ISKCON for various deviations. The following year all members of the community who remained faithful to Kirtanananda Swami – which included Radhanath Swami – were also expelled from ISKCON. In the 1990s, Kirtanananda faced several criminal charges and in 1996 was sentenced to 20 years in prison for mail fraud. In 1994, Radhanath Swami returned to ISKCON. In the same year, he became one of the leaders of ISKCON, and began to serve as a member of the Governing Body Commission and an initiating guru. In 1995–2010, Radhanath Swami led ISKCON in Maharashtra (1995-2010), Goa (2002-2010), Daman and Diu (2002-2010), West Virginia (1995-2007), Ohio (1998-2007 ), Kentucky (1998-2007), Italy (2002–present) and Belgaum (1995-2010).

== Projects ==
=== Radha Gopinath Temple ===
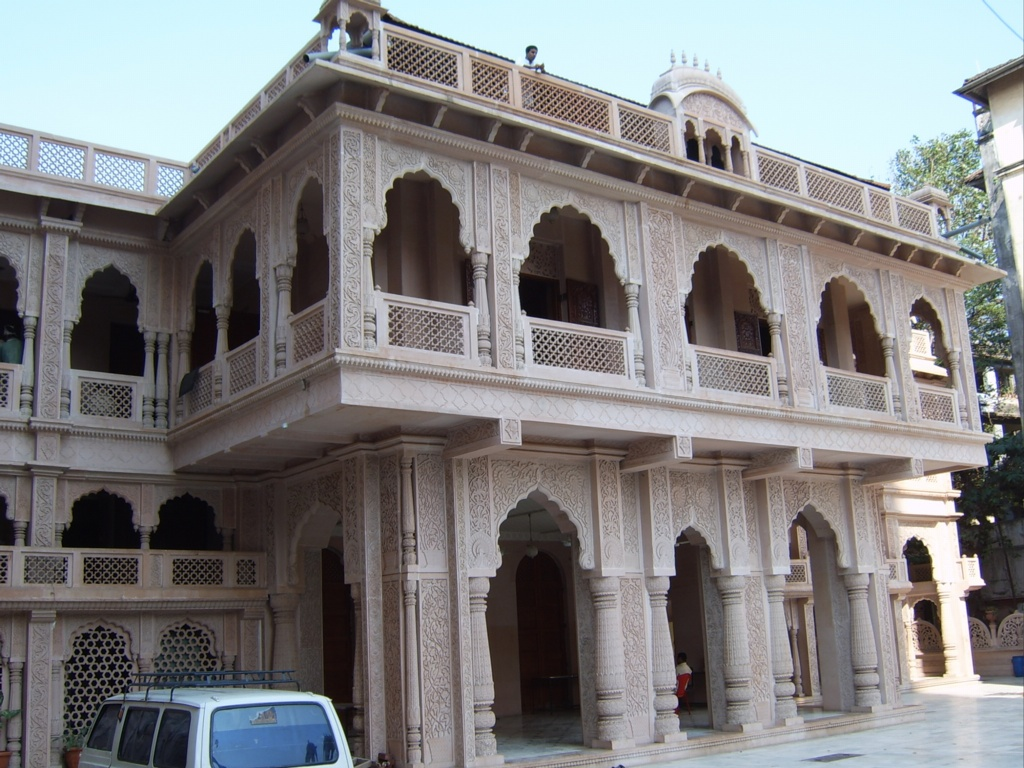
Radha Gopinath Temple in Nov. 2004

Succeeding to Kirtanananda Swami, Radhanath Swami has been instrumental in the guidance of the Radha Gopinath Temple since 1991, which "expanded beyond anyone's wildest dreams" and is particularly renowned for its "empowered preaching and teaching". Also known as Sri Sri Radha Gopinath Mandir, the temple was founded in 1986 and joined ISKCON in 1994. The temple is situated in the elite area of Bombay – Chowpatty Beach – and enjoys great popularity. The congregation comprises several thousands of Bombay's elite. A prerequisite for those wishing to become a monk and live in the temple is the completion of university education and at least one year of work experience. The monks from the temple of Radha-Gopinath regularly conduct more than 30 cultural programs at the University of Bombay. Under Radhanath Swami's initiative, the temple and its congregation have been breeding grounds for many successful projects. The temple has an in-house design studio and embroidery unit, where artisans meticulously work with clockwork precision, following briefs by designers, to dress up the deities in the choicest of regal attires.

=== Devotee Care and Relations Program ===
Based on the Hare Krishna ideology, Radhanath Swami designed the Devotee Care Program in Radha Gopinath Temple, which eventually led ISKCON to emphasize the need for such a program globally. In Radha Gopinath Temple in Mumbai, the program spans diverse aspects such as cultural education and school for children, an orphanage, youth preaching, marriage board, care for monks as well as the elderly, counselling for the householders, credit organization, hospital, farm, annual pilgrimages, drama festivals and ISKCON Food Relief Foundation.

Led by Radhanath, the Chowpatty Temple's Devotee Care and Relations Program was developed in Mumbai, India in 1986. This Devotee Care and Relations Program established the Bhaktivedanta Hospital, ISKCON Food Relief Foundation, financial aid programs, and many other institutions addressing the physical needs of devotees. To address the importance of emotional and spiritual care, the temple is known for developing Grihastha Counseling. This counselling has the "primary purpose to foster trust among devotees"; the program arranges a formal counselling system where experienced devotees help foster the spiritual development of new devotees. The temple also leads a trip to Govardhan Farm, a tropical fruit and bamboo nursery in the Caribbean, advocating for "spiritually healthy" recreation. A model for Devotee Care and Relations Programs around the world, this program serves as an example for developing Devotee Care and Relation Programs in New Vrindaban.

— Johnson et al., Harvard Pluralism Project

=== Annamrita ===
Launched in 2004, ISKCON Food Relief Foundation – under the brand name "Annamrita" – is the Indian leg of the global Food for Life organization and is considered a "leader in this field". Inspired by Radhanath Swami and others, it operates the Indian Government's Midday Meal Scheme meant to improve both nutrition and literacy among school-going children. Since serving 900 meals on its first day of operations, Annamrita has expanded considerably over a decade and, as of 2014, daily serves about 1.2 million meals across ten states in India from 20 of its high-tech, industrial (mostly ISO-certified) kitchens. The program is funded through public-private partnership, wherein the Government provides the ingredients, while the cooking and delivery costs are jointly covered by the Government as well as private sponsors. The program offers a "different menu every day and simple protein-rich food [...] cooked innovatively along with seasonal vegetables for a wholesome meal", and has been credited with improving attendance in schools. Although launched for primary and secondary schools, on account of its success, the program has been extended to post-graduate students, hospital patients and NTR canteens. Michelin-starred chef Vikas Khanna is Annamrita's "Goodwill Ambassador", who pledged his support and efforts to complement the awareness and fund-raising efforts. Annamrita's efforts have been recognized by the President of India as well through several awards – to name a few, the D.Y. Patil 2012 Award for "Best Organization in Social Work", Lifebuoy National Child Health Award 2012 for "Exemplary work in promoting Nutrition", PP Mohan Shahani Trophy for the "Best Club Partner NGO" by Rotary Club, and Indian Development Foundation's 2012 "Best Partner Award".

=== Bhaktivedanta Hospital ===
Emerging from the Radha Gopinath Temple congregation, the Bhaktivedanta Hospital has become a center for holistic health and spiritual care in Mumbai. It started off as an aim of fresh medical school graduates in 1986 which has now become the present-day multi-specialty hospital by Sri Chaitanya Welfare Charitable Trust. As a tribute to ISKCON founder A. C. Bhaktivedanta Swami Prabhupada and by the inspiration of Radhanath Swami, it functions as a "not-for-profit" institution with the motto of "Serving in Devotion".

In the early days, the doctors conducted medical camps in various areas in and around Maharashtra. These served the medically deprived and needy. Years of dedicated service to thousands of patients led to the launch of 7-bed 'Sri Chaitanya Clinic' (or Bhaktivedanta Clinic) in Mira Road, Mumbai in 1992, which eventually led to establishing the 60-bed Bhaktivedanta Hospital in 1998.

Though closed in 2003 due to a labour dispute, it reopened in August 2004 under a different trust. As of 2014, it also includes four ultramodern operation theaters, a 16-bed ICU, 120 consulting specialists and 360 medical and paramedical staff – about half of which are initiated Hare Krishna followers.

The hospital also houses an Ayurveda, Yoga and Rehabilitation Center as well as an exclusive department on Spiritual Care. On the educational front, it includes an Institute of Nursing Education, Institute of Paramedical Science and a Certificate Course for Spiritual Care in Nursing. The Bhaktivedanta Cancer Institute, Eye Care/Vision Center, Urology Center and Center of excellence in Heart Care enhance the breadth of services offered. The hospital also has a special team for counselling patients and a palliative care unit.

Community services form one of the core pillars of the hospital, which it extensively pursues. It has medically-equipped mobile vans to attend to eye care, cancer and maternity issues in remote sections of society; on the same lines, it also established the Hamrapur Community Healthcare Center in Wada Taluka, Maharashtra in association with Lions Club. In addition to social initiatives such as the Green Paper Forum, the hospital conducts regular free medical camps such as the Barsana Eye and Dental Camp, Pandharpur Camp, Senior Citizen Camp, School Camp, Cancer Camp and Dialysis Camp.

The annual Barsana Camp, in particular, has been highly successful in that the doctors perform 600-700 free cataract surgeries annually and have even attracted doctors from far-off lands like the US and Britain. Consequently, the efforts led to the founding of the Barsana Health Care Center in Uttar Pradesh.

In addition, the Bhaktivedanta Hospice Center serves those who desire to spend their last days in the holy site of Vrindavan with good medical care. The hospital is also proactive in disaster relief activities such as the Gujarat earthquake relief (2001), tsunami relief (2004), Mumbai flood relief (2005), Mumbai bomb-blasts (2006) and Uttarakhand floods (2013).

In 2014, AmeriCares India awarded Bhaktivedanta Hospital the "Spirit of Humanity Awards" for their work in the category of Oncology, while it also won "Best Multi Specialty Hospital", "Best Hospital for Wellness & Healthcare", "Excellence in Hospice & Palliative Medicine" and "Best Teacher" awards in Indo-Global Healthcare Summit & Expo 2014. The Times of India, in association with New India Assurance Co. Ltd., recognized the hospital's persistent efforts and designated them as "Trendsetter in Quality Patient Care and Safety" in the Healthcare Achievers Awards 2014.

=== Govardhan Ecovillage ===
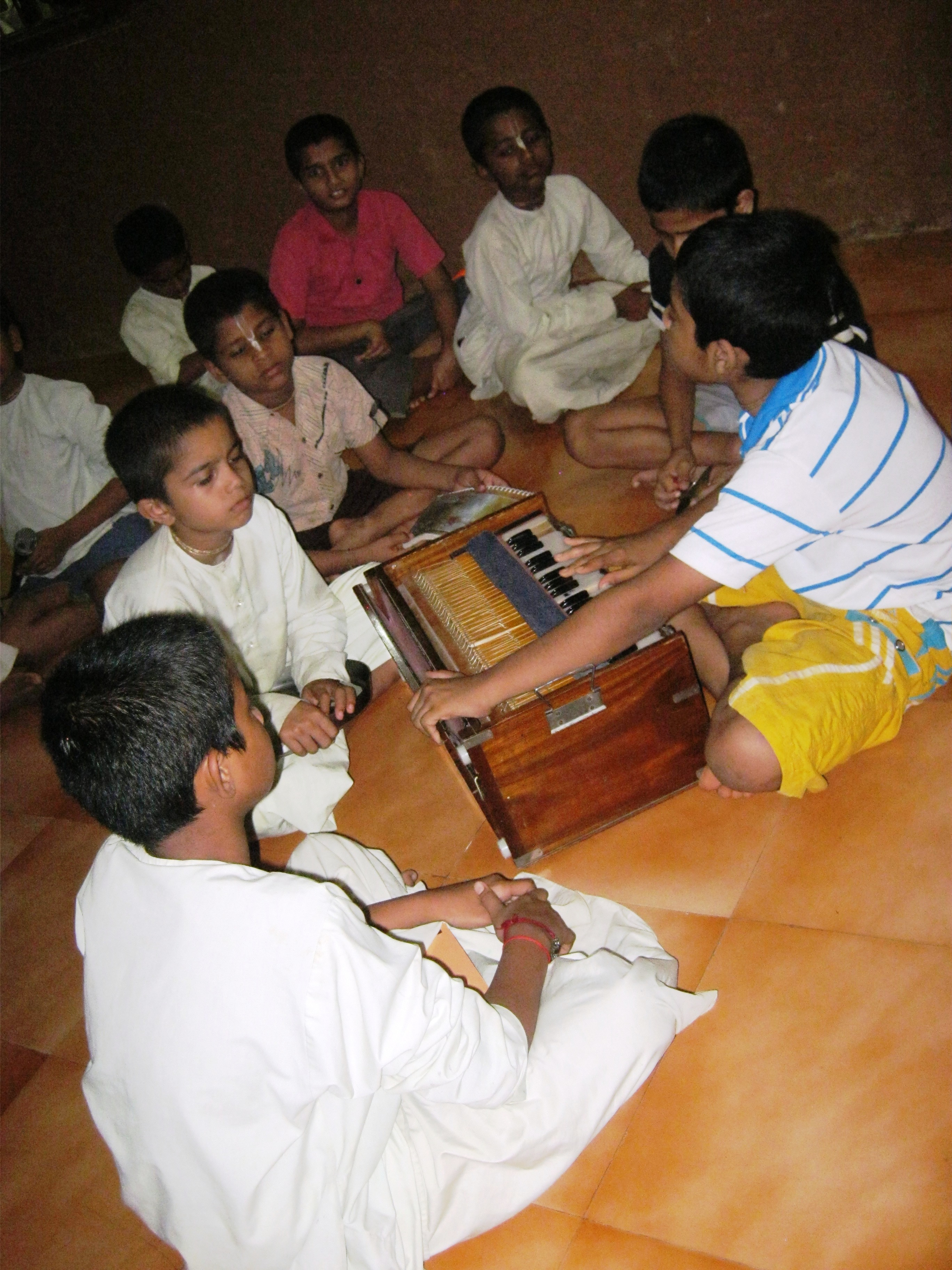
Children from Lady Northcote Hindu Orphanage singing bhajans

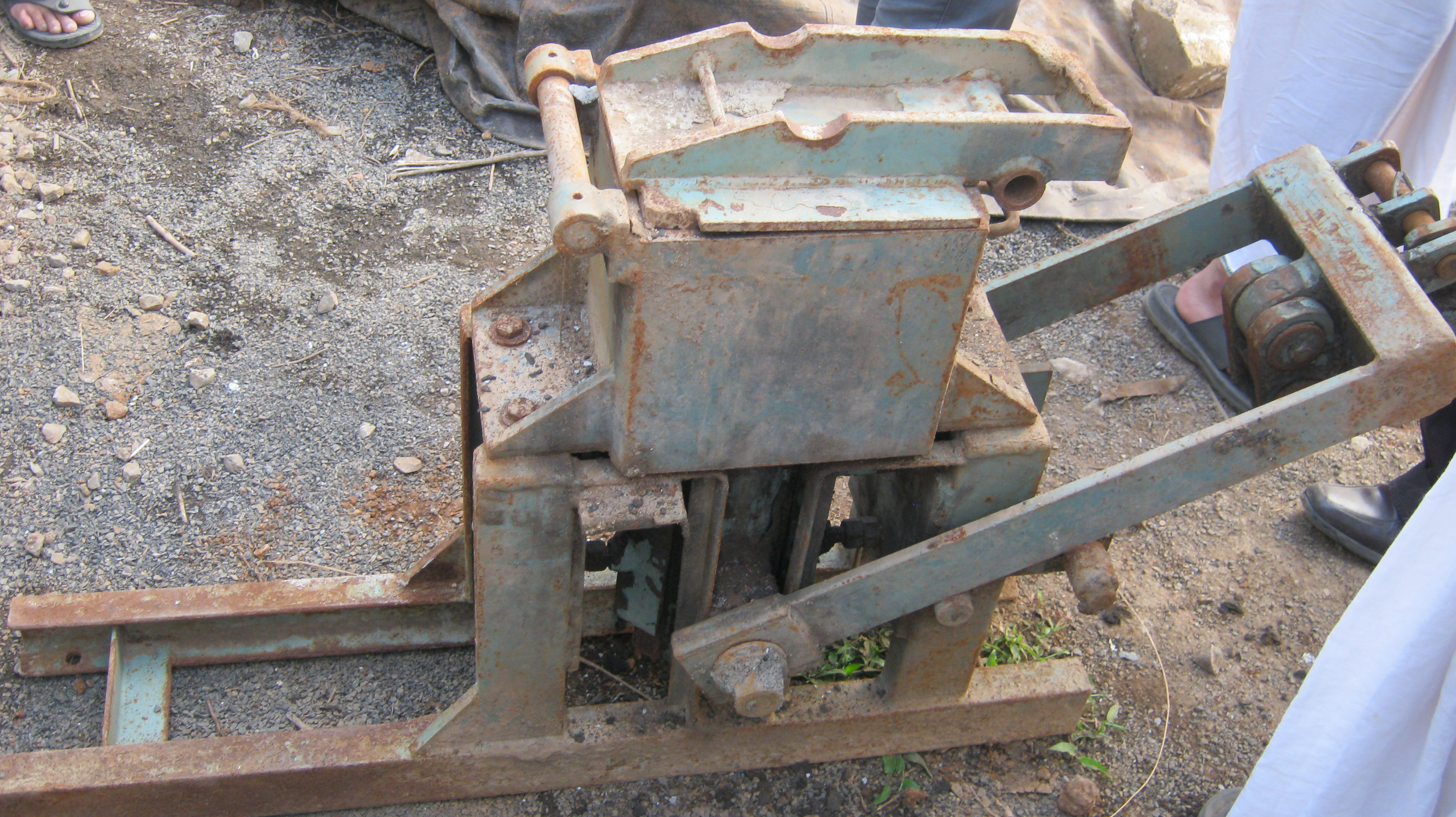
Tool used to make CSEB in GEV

Spread over 75 acres of farmland at the foothills of the Sahyadri mountain in the Wada district of Maharashtra, Govardhan Ecovillage (GEV) is a "model farm community and retreat center highlighting the importance of spiritual ecology: the need for us [humans] to live in harmony with ourselves, nature and the sacred". Inspired by Radhanath Swami, with its humble beginnings in 2003, GEV was officially inaugurated in 2011, in the presence of Nana Saheb Patil, Ex-secretary of the Agricultural Ministry for the Government of Maharashtra. To bring about holistic, sustainable ecological changes, GEV puts great emphasis on community initiatives such as integrated water conservation and protection, Wadi program, women empowerment, rural health care, food for life, biodiversity park, Vedic culture and educational center and animal shelters. GEV specializes in symbiotic recycling and strives to offer sustainable solutions for community living in issues related to food, water, energy and waste management. GEV is also home to the Lady Northcote Hindu Orphanage.

GEV's achievements in the area of integrated water conservation and protection were honored with the Skoch 2013 Platinum Award and Order-of-Merit. Its initiative to build houses with Compressed Stabilized Earth Blocks (CSEB), Rammed Earth technique, Cob houses (Adobe bricks) with traditional thatched roofs was awarded 5-star rating by GRIHA (an indigenous rating system for green buildings in India). In recognition of its continued efforts towards environmental sustainability, a Special Jury Award was conferred upon GEV by the India Chapter of the International Advertising Association's Olive Crown Awards 2013.

== Writings ==
=== The Journey Home ===
On the request of his friend and godbrother Bhakti Tirtha Swami, who was on his deathbed, Radhanath Swami, although initially unwilling, agreed to share his story and wrote his memoir "The Journey Home: Autobiography of an American Swami". It is the story of how he grew up in a Jewish family in Chicago and through his journey of prayer was led through the 1960s counter-culture movement in America into Europe, walking and hitch-hiking through Europe to the Middle East and into India. Along the way, he met many people, who would share their wisdom with him, encouraging him on his search for the truth. He stayed with Yogis in Himalayan caves, in Buddhist monasteries, Synagogues, and Churches. He met many teachers and practitioners of spirituality and learned from them, such as the 14th Dalai Lama and Mother Teresa, to name a few. The book chronicles his spiritual quest.

Like many a spiritual autobiography, the external events and details turn out to be the setting for the author's inner quest. His journey is humbling, learning to be poor, a series of tests that push the author toward living by faith alone. Like any pilgrim, he does not see all of this along the way, but in retrospect sees how he was being quietly, insistently drawn toward God all the time.

— Francis Xavier Clooney, A Hare Krishna Swami Tells All

The book launch of the Gujarati edition was held in November 2011, and was attended by the then chief minister of Gujarat Narendra Modi (in 2014, he became the Prime Minister of India). In his speech at the book launch, Modi emphasized spirituality as the true identity of India and contrasted Radhanath Swami's spiritual journey with that of personalities such as Mirabai and Vivekananda.

=== The Journey Within ===
A sequel to Journey Home, The Journey Within, was launched in May 2016.The Journey Within: Exploring the Path of Bhakti, became the New York Times Bestseller in July 2016 under the category of 'Religion, Spirituality and Faith'.

=== Other books ===
Radhanath Swami's lectures have also been thematically published in the form of books, which includes those based on his quotations, such as Nectar Drops and Nectar Stream, and those based on his lectures and teachings such as Evolve, Six Goswamis of Vrindavan, The Wisdom Tree, and The Real You. The book "Soul Wise" (later renamed to "The Real You") was reviewed on Spirit Sundae, SABC1, South Africa.

== Global outreach ==
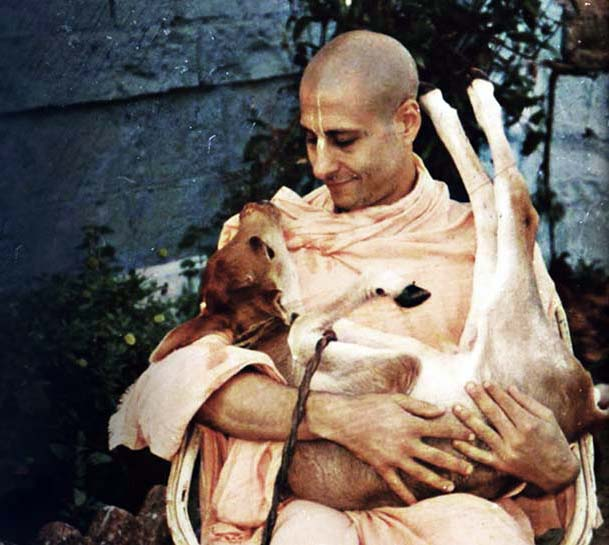
Radhanath Swami holding a small calf

Radhanath Swami has a global influence and has been honored for his humanitarian deeds. He is on the advisory panel of I-Foundation, which is credited with launching the first government-funded Hindu faith school in London.

Radhanath Swami's interfaith discussion with Cornel West resulted in "greater possibilities for both interfaith and intrafaith dialog [...] on Princeton's campus". The event is regarded as a model for meaningful exchanges between followers of different beliefs, and was awarded the 2011 Santos-Dumont Prize for Innovation that recognizes "a unique and creative program, event, initiative, or project [on Princeton's campus] [...] which has had wide-reaching impact and visibility". His interfaith discussions with Francis X. Clooney were also very well received.

For me as a Christian it was inspiring to hear this great Hindu teacher talk about finding ways to allow ourselves to be motivated and prompted by the love of God and by God's love for us. ... I felt honoured as a Christian to sit in the presence of a great itinerant spiritual teacher.

— Rev'd Andrew Willson, University Chaplain at Imperial College, London, His Holiness Radhanath Swami – the Guru comes to town

Radhanath Swami presented ancient spiritual solutions to modern subjugation at esteemed debating society, Oxford Union. The Union's event, dubbed Malcolm X's Speech in Oxford — 50 years later, marked the anniversary of X's acclaimed Oxford address. The event's aim: to rouse modern thought and contention on a radical approach to preserving liberty. Radhanath Swami put forth ecumenical spiritual truths as means of harmonizing society. Prominent participants included Angela Davis, Dr. Cornel West, Prof. Stephen Tuck and Ben Okri.

Radhanath Swami appeared as the main speaker at a corporate workshop held by the Confederation of Indian Industry (CII). The exclusive interactive session, deemed Spirituality: Leadership and Management, hosted over 150 of India's top corporate executives. Radhanath Swami conveyed the value of integrity, humility and simplicity in daily business affairs. Prominent speakers included Piramal Group chairman, Ajay Piramal and Future Group CEO, Kishore Biyani.

Many famous and influential people interacted with Radhanath Swami and expressed their appreciation of his character and work. Among them are Ajay Piramal, Anil Agarwal, Yash Birla and Chetan Bhagat. Renowned yoga teacher, B. K. S. Iyengar and Madhva sect spiritual leader Vishvesha Teertha of Pejavara Matha also met him and appreciated his work. Steven J. Rosen described Radhanath Swami as a "saintly person respected by the mass of ISKCON devotees today".

He's a beautiful fellow. He's got the answer. I'm a spiritual gent and increasingly that's the level I want to vibrate on.

— Russell Brand, after meeting Radhanath Swami

== See also ==
- International Society for Krishna Consciousness
- Bhakti Yoga
- Vaishnavism
- List of ISKCON members and patrons
- Baba Rampuri
