= Anil Rathod =

Indian politician (1950–2020)

Minister of State in Government of Maharashtra
- In office 1995–1997

Member of Maharashtra Legislative Assembly
- In office 1990–2014
- Constituency: Ahmednagar South (1990–2009); Ahmednagar City (2009–2014)

Personal details
- Born: 12 March 1950
- Died: 5 August 2020 (aged 70) Ahmednagar, Maharashtra, India
- Party: Shiv Sena

Anil Rathod (12 March 1950 – 5 August 2020) was an Indian politician from Ahmednagar district, Maharashtra. From 1990 to 2014, he was a member of the Maharashtra Legislative Assembly from Ahmednagar City Vidhan Sabha constituency as a member of Shiv Sena. He died from a heart attack on 5 August 2020.

== Positions held ==
- 1990: Elected to Maharashtra Legislative Assembly (1st term)
- 1995: Re-elected to Maharashtra Legislative Assembly (2nd term)
- 1999: Re-elected to Maharashtra Legislative Assembly (3rd term)
- 2004: Re-elected to Maharashtra Legislative Assembly (4th term)
- 2009: Re-elected to Maharashtra Legislative Assembly (5th term)
- 2009–2020: Deputy Leader, Shiv Sena
