= Food Yoga International =

Non-profit food relief organization

- Founded: 1974
- Founder: Paul Rodney Turner
- Type: Charity
- Tax ID no.: 36-4887167
- Purpose: World hunger and equality
- Location: Delaware, US
- Origins: Was first founded in Potomac, Maryland, in 1995; however, it has roots dating back to 1974
- Region served: Worldwide
- Key people: Juliana Castaneda, Steve Manz
- Website: ffl.org

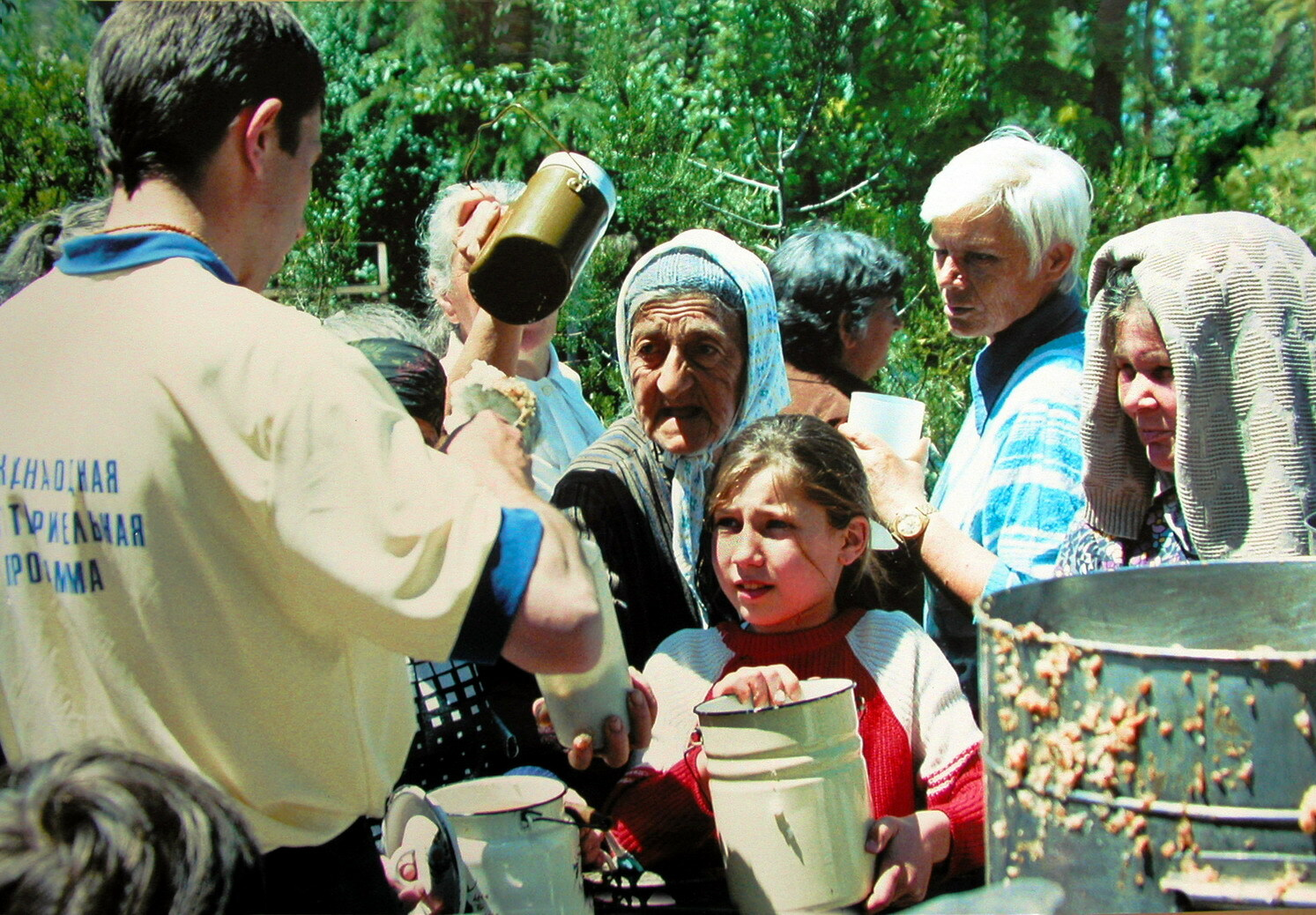
Member of Food for Life Russia giving food

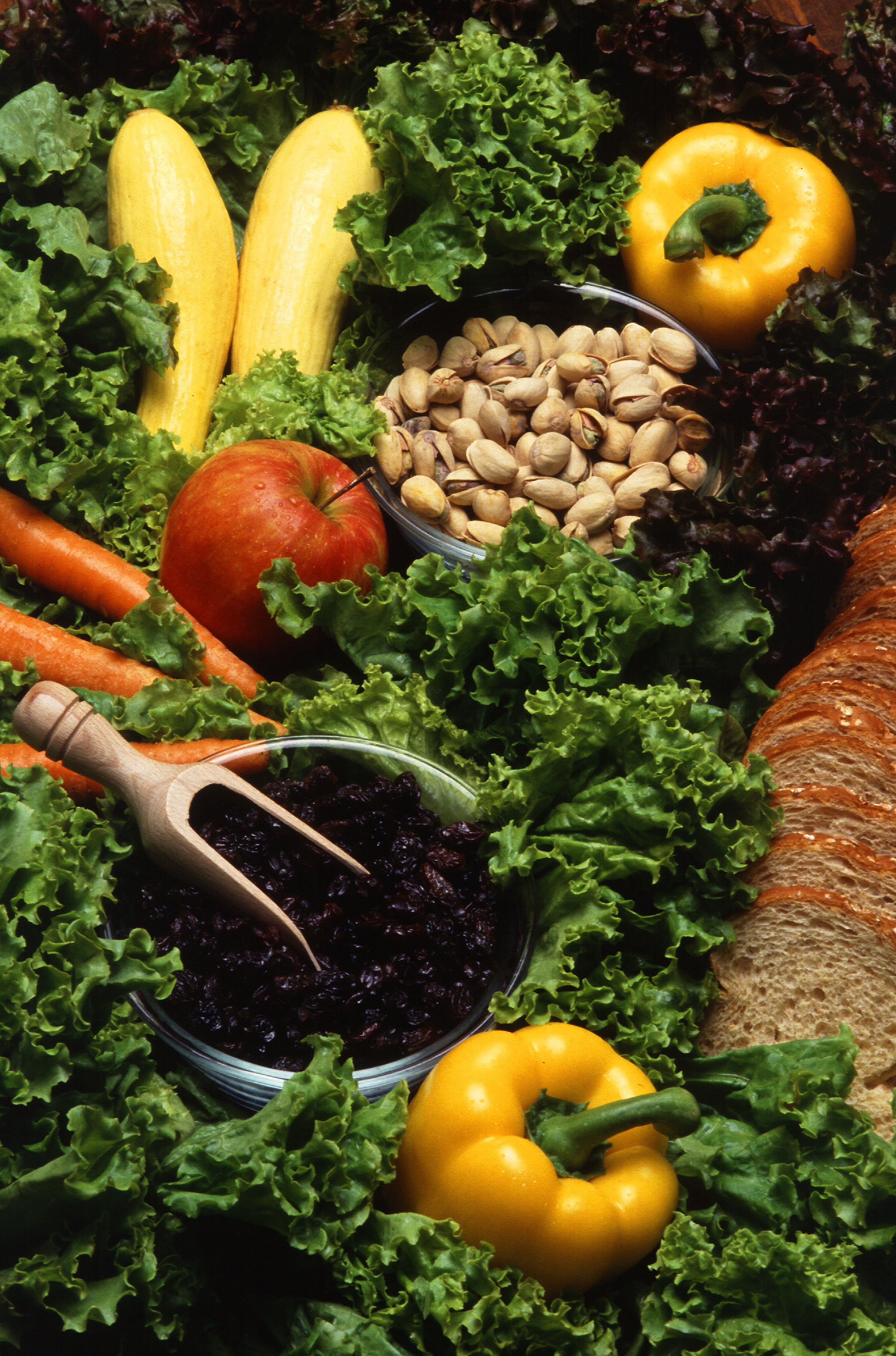
Food for Life distributes food produced solely from vegan and lacto-vegetarian ingredients.

Food Yoga International, formally Food For Life Global, is a non-profit vegan food relief organization founded in 1995 to serve as the headquarters for Food Yoga International projects. Food Yoga International has its roots in ISKCON dating back to 1974. It is a completely independent non-profit organization that supports the work of Food Yoga International projects both inside and outside of ISKCON. Its network of 291 affiliates span the globe, with projects occupying over 65 countries. Volunteers provide over 1 million free meals daily. Food Yoga International engages in various sorts of hunger relief, including outreach to the homeless, provision for disadvantaged children throughout India, and provision for victims of natural disasters around the world.

With roots in India, the Food for Life project views itself as a modern-day revival of the ancient Vedic culture of hospitality and service to those in need. It was conceived in 1974 as a local food relief in Mayapur, India, as part of the International Society for Krishna Consciousness. In 1995, the headquarters was established in Maryland, United States, to help support the expansion of the project, temporarily moved to Slovenia from 2015 to 2017, and then re-established in Delaware, United States, in 2017.

== History ==
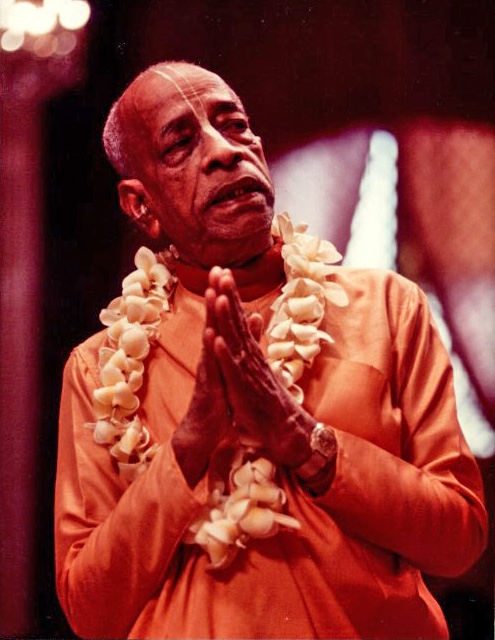
A. C. Bhaktivedanta Swami, who inspired Food Yoga International

Food Yoga International as a project was initially inspired by an elderly Indian Swami, known as A. C. Bhaktivedanta Swami Prabhupada, Founder-Acharya of ISKCON. In 1974 when watching a group of village children fighting with street dogs over scraps of food, the Swami was shocked and told his students, "No one within ten miles of our temple should go hungry... I want you to begin serving food immediately." In response to his plea, members of ISKCON and volunteers around the world were inspired to expand that original effort into a global network of kitchens, cafes, vans, and mobile services, all providing free food, and establishing daily delivery routes in many large cities around the world. Since that day, Food Yoga International has grown into the world's largest vegan food relief. The distribution of sanctified plant-based meals has been and will continue to be an essential part of India's Vedic culture of hospitality from which Food for Life was born.

With volunteers serving over 1,000,000 free plant-based meals daily to schools, as well as from mobile vans and to disaster areas. Food Yoga International is now the largest food relief network in the world, eclipsing even the United Nations World Food Programme.

Food Yoga International volunteers have provided food for the poor and homeless during several recent disasters.

- 2024 – Food For Life Global rebrands to Food Yoga International
- 2021 – Responding to the global COVID-19 pandemic with freshly cooked meals in major cities across the world.
- 2020 – FFL Honduras served vegan meals to survivors of Hurricane Eta.
- 2020 – FFL Costa Rica served vegan meals to survivors of Hurricane Eta that devastated the island.
- 2020 – FFL projects around the world continued to provide meals during the COVID-19 lockdown
- 2017 – FFL Mexico provided thousands of vegan meals to survivors of a 7.1 Earthquake in Mexico
- 2015 – Food for Life Nepal provided over 100,000 vegan meals to survivors of the April 2015 Nepal earthquake.
- 2013 – Food for Life provided vegan food relief to survivors of Cyclone Phailin in India and Typhoon Haiyan in the Philippines.
- 2008 – Food For Life served freshly cooked vegan meals to survivors of Hurricane Gustav and Hurricane Ike in the southern United States.
- 2007 – Food For Life volunteers were on the ground to feed many of the hundreds of thousands of survivors who were left homeless after Cyclone Sidr, the deadliest cyclone to hit Bangladesh in a decade.
- 2005 – Following the earthquake in Pakistan, Food For Life volunteers worked side-by-side with local military and police personnel, distributing drinking water, food, tents, and blankets.
- 2005 – When Hurricane Katrina struck the Gulf Coast with deadly force, Food For Life volunteers were among the first responders, distributing up to 800 freshly cooked meals daily to needy families in Mississippi and Texas.
- 2004 – 2005 A killer tsunami wreaked caused massive damage to areas in South Asia, resulting in the deaths of nearly 200,000 people. Food For Life volunteers joined the relief effort on the very day of the disaster, providing thousands of meals daily, along with medical care, clothing, and shelter in Sri Lanka and India.
- the 1990s – Food For Life volunteers risked their lives in the war-torn countries of Chechnya, Bosnia and Abkhazia, distributing food to needy and frightened civilians.

In total, Food Yoga International has distributed more than 8 billion meals since its inception.

Food Yoga International has expanded its reach to include eco-projects such as Govardhana Eco Village; as well as orphanages such as Gokulam – Bhaktivedanta Children's Home Gokulam in Sri Lanka, a refuge where needy children receive food, shelter, medical care, education and loving care and Juliana's Animal Sanctuary, the only farm sanctuary in Colombia and the winner of Best International Sanctuary for 2021 by the Global Federation of Farm Sanctuaries.

== Cryptocurrency donations ==
Food for Life Global became one of the first international charities to accept cryptocurrency donations via The Giving Block. As a result, the non-profit co-founded The Kindly Ecosystem (Kindly), a humanitarian-based crypto project that supports measurable social impact, including serving vegan meals to people in need via Food for Life Global.

== COVID-19 relief ==
Although some Food for Life Global affiliates were not able to respond to the crisis because of lockdown and social distancing guidelines, many were able to provide freshly cooked vegan meals to needy people and first responders, including throughout India, Russia, Ukraine, England, Argentina, Brazil, Australia, to name a few.

== Disaster relief ==
=== Siege of Sarajevo ===
In the war zone of Sarajevo, Bosnia and Herzegovina, volunteers visited orphanages, homes for the elderly, hospitals, institutes for handicapped children, and basement shelters on a daily basis throughout the three-year conflict; an estimated 20 tons of food have been distributed since 1992.

=== Chechen Wars ===
In a New York Times article dated (December 12, 1995) volunteers in Chechnya were described as having "a reputation like the one Mother Teresa has in Calcutta: it's not hard finding people to swear they are saints."

=== 2004 Tsunami ===
Food for Life was the first food relief agency to respond to the tsunami disaster of December 2004. On the same afternoon the great tsunami hit, Vaisnava monks at ISKCON's temple in Chennai, India, were preparing their weekly Sunday feast when they heard of the disaster. They immediately raced to the most affected areas on the southeast coastline of India and began serving thousands of people with their preprepared vegetable curry. Over the following six months, Food for Life Volunteers in Sri Lanka, India, Europe, the USA, and Australia provided more than 350,000 freshly cooked meals, along with medical care, water, clothing, and shelter for children at ISKCON's orphanage in Colombo, the Bhaktivedanta Children's Home.

=== Hurricane Katrina ===
Food for Life Global Volunteers responded to the Hurricane Katrina disaster in late August 2005 by providing vegan meals to families relocated to Mississippi and Texas. Up to 800 meals were served daily.

=== Pakistan earthquake ===
Volunteers from Udhampur, Jammu, Amritsar, and Haridwar under the guidance of Navayogendra Swami Maharaj, a prominent disciple of A.C. Bhaktivedanta Swami Prabhupada, came together to provide relief for victims of the 2005 earthquake in Pakistan. Working from an ISKCON temple in Udhampur, which was within the earthquake-affected region, the volunteers loaded trucks with drinking water, rice, bread, and blankets.

== ISKCON Food Relief Foundation ==
Food for Life Global's principal affiliate, the Food for Life Annamrita program, was founded by ISKCON Food Relief Foundation (IFRF), which believes in providing children with the right nutrition to support their education. IFRF's Food for Life Annamrita program is based on the belief that "you become what you eat." The nutritious meals this program serves daily encourage over a million children to attend school. One of their goals is to help every child in India get a full education by providing wholesome meals. They are currently serving 1.3 million meals daily from dozens of high-tech kitchens in 21 cities.

== Food for Life Global ==
Food for Life Global (FFLG) was founded in 1995 in Maryland, US, but closed its offices at the end of 2014. It re-established its offices in Slovenia in 2015, where it continued to serve as the headquarters and coordinating office for all Food for Life projects worldwide. However, in 2017, the Slovenian office was closed, and a new US office was established in Wilmington, Delaware, to serve as the international headquarters.

== Founders ==
Paul Rodney Turner, also known as Priyavrata das or the "food yogi," is the international director. Along with Mukunda Goswami and Rukmini Walker, they co-founded the original Food for Life Global charity in 1995. The new executive committee for Food for Life Global offices in USA and Europe can be found here:

== FFLG Activities ==
- Coordinating and expanding the distribution of sanctified plant-based meals all over the world to the disadvantaged, malnourished, and victims of disasters.
- Producing promotional and training materials for the development of Food for Life projects worldwide.
- Presenting Food for Life to governments, the media, and the general public through public lectures, newspaper articles, the Internet, and mail.
- Promoting the Vedic culture of hospitality and spiritual equality throughout the world.
- Raising funds on behalf of Food for Life worldwide.
- Helping establish pure food prepared and served with loving intention as a viable means to create peace and unity in the world.
- Organizing and sponsoring emergency vegan relief efforts conducted by Food for Life volunteers.

== Food Yoga ==
In the early years of Food for Life Global, Paul Rodney Turner aspired to find a way to fulfill the vision of A. C. Bhaktivedanta Swami who stated that "everyone should get a chance to take prasadam." Figuring that it was impossible to reach everyone with the small number of volunteers that serve in Food for Life, Turner realized that the solution was to teach people about prasadam, empowering them with the knowledge of spiritualizing their relationship with food. His book, FOOD YOGA – Nourishing Body, Mind, & Soul, published on Amazon, was the culmination of many years of research and meditation and serves to directly educate the public about how to become prasadarians.

== Food Yoga standard ==
Food Yoga is a completely new approach to holistic living. Until now, philosophies on healthy living and nutrition have focused on the mechanics of health and happiness, exclusively focusing on the body alone. In doing so, these philosophies have promoted practices and diets that, in one way or another, have alienated vast numbers of people. As a result, despite volumes of literature and research, there is no consensus on the best diet or mode of living. They have all failed to identify one underlying truth that connects us all and from which all health systems can be reconciled and/or elevated to their ultimate stature. That truth is: our constitutional nature is spirit and we are all spiritually equal. Any healthy living program, therefore, needs to address the "nutritional" needs of the body, mind, and spirit.

== Vegan policy ==
Although Food for Life started out as a vegetarian food relief, in 1998, a policy was adopted by Food for Life Global that it would only financially support Food for Life projects that served vegan meals.

== See also ==
- International Society for Krishna Consciousness
- Srila Prabhupada
- List of vegetarian and vegan organizations
