= Rahuri Assembly constituency =

Constituency of the Maharashtra legislative assembly in India

Coordinates: 19.39°N 74.65°E

Rahuri
- Constituency No. 223 for the Maharashtra Legislative Assembly

Constituency details
- Country: India
- Region: Western India
- State: Maharashtra
- District: Ahilyanagar
- Lok Sabha constituency: Ahmednagar
- Established: 1951
- Total electors: 325,166
- Reservation: None

Member of Legislative Assembly
- 15th Maharashtra Legislative Assembly
- Incumbent Akshay Shivajirao Kardile
- Party: Bhartiya Janata Party
- Elected year: 2026^

Rahuri Assembly constituency is one of the 288 Vidhan Sabha (legislative assembly) constituencies of Maharashtra state, western India. This constituency is located in Ahmednagar district.

== Geographical scope ==
The constituency comprises Rahuri and Vambori revenue circles and Rahuri Municipal Council belonging to Rahuri taluka, Jeur revenue circle belonging to Ahmednagar taluka and Karanji revenue circle belonging to Pathardi taluka.

== Members of the Legislative Assembly ==
Election	Member	Party
1952	Laxamanrao Madhavrao Patil	Indian National Congress
1957	Laxamanrao Madhavrao Patil	Independent politician
1962	Baburao Bapuji Tanpure	Indian National Congress
1967	Baburao Bapuji Tanpure	Indian National Congress
1972	Punjaji Bapuji Kadu	Communist Party of India
1978	Kashinath Laxman Pawar	Indian National Congress
1980	Prasadrao Baburao Tanpure	Indian National Congress (I)
1985	Prasadrao Baburao Tanpure	Independent politician
1990	Prasadrao Baburao Tanpure	Indian National Congress
1995	Prasadrao Baburao Tanpure	Indian National Congress
1998 By-election	Chandrashekhar Laxmanrao Kadam	Bharatiya Janata Party
1999	Prasadrao Baburao Tanpure	Nationalist Congress Party
2004	Chandrashekar Laxmanrao Kadam	Bharatiya Janata Party
2009	Shivaji Bhanudas Kardile	Bharatiya Janata Party
2014	Shivaji Bhanudas Kardile	Bharatiya Janata Party
2019	Prajakt Tanpure	Nationalist Congress Party
2024	Shivaji Bhanudas Kardile	Bharatiya Janata Party
2026^	Akshay Shivajirao Kardile	Bharatiya Janata Party

== Election results ==
=== Assembly By-election 2026 ===
2026 Maharashtra Legislative Assembly by-election : Rahuri
Party	Candidate	Votes	%	±%
BJP	Akshay Shivajirao Kardile	140,093	75.00	▲18.89
NCP-SP	Govindrao Khandu Mokate	27,506	14.73	▼27.07
Independent	Raosaheb Sadaram Kheware	7,299	3.91	New
VBA	Santosh Cholake	5,690	3.05	New
Margin of victory		1,12,587	60.27	▲46.05
Turnout		1,86,787	55.31	▼19.66
BJP hold		Swing	▲18.89	

=== Assembly Election 2024 ===
2024 Maharashtra Legislative Assembly election : Rahuri
Party	Candidate	Votes	%	±%
BJP	Shivaji Bhanudas Kardile	135,859	56.02	▲12.90
NCP-SP	Prajakt Tanpure	101,372	41.80	New
NOTA	None of the above	1,264	0.52	▼0.43
Margin of victory		34,487	14.22	▲2.51
Turnout		243,771	74.97	▲6.21
Total valid votes		242,507		
Registered electors		325,166		▲11.11
BJP gain from NCP		Swing	▲1.19	

=== Assembly Election 2019 ===
2019 Maharashtra Legislative Assembly election : Rahuri
Party	Candidate	Votes	%	±%
NCP	Prajakt Tanpure	109,234	54.83	▲42.31
BJP	Shivaji Bhanudas Kardile	85,908	43.12	▼4.29
NOTA	None of the above	1,892	0.95	▲0.27
Independent	Lambe Suresh Alias Suryabhan Dattatray	1,552	0.78	New
Margin of victory		23,326	11.71	▼1.60
Turnout		201,238	68.76	▼2.55
Total valid votes		199,224		
Registered electors		292,663		▲7.38
NCP gain from BJP		Swing	▲7.42	

=== Assembly Election 2014 ===
2014 Maharashtra Legislative Assembly election : Rahuri
Party	Candidate	Votes	%	±%
BJP	Shivaji Bhanudas Kardile	91,454	47.41	▲13.86
SS	Dr. Usha Prasad Tanpure	65,778	34.10	New
NCP	Shivajiraje Rambhau Gade	24,143	12.52	▼16.16
INC	Amol Bhausaheb Jadhav	4,075	2.11	New
Independent	Govindrao Khandu Mokate	2,593	1.34	New
NOTA	None of the above	1,318	0.68	New
Margin of victory		25,676	13.31	▲8.44
Turnout		194,352	71.31	▼0.13
Total valid votes		192,894		
Registered electors		272,556		▲13.56
BJP hold		Swing	▲13.86	

=== Assembly Election 2009 ===
2009 Maharashtra Legislative Assembly election : Rahuri
Party	Candidate	Votes	%	±%
BJP	Shivaji Bhanudas Kardile	57,380	33.55	▼17.77
NCP	Prasad Baburao Tanpure	49,047	28.68	▼15.58
SWP	Shivaji Rambhau Gade	42,141	24.64	New
Independent	Subhash Dattatraya Patil	14,484	8.47	New
MNS	Dnyaneshwar Dattatraya Gade	2,474	1.45	New
Independent	Salve Subhash Bansi	1,358	0.79	New
BSP	Ohal Anil Manohar	1,138	0.67	▼1.70
Margin of victory		8,333	4.87	▼2.19
Turnout		171,461	71.44	▼3.34
Total valid votes		171,044		
Registered electors		240,008		▲30.17
BJP hold		Swing	▼17.77	

=== Assembly Election 2004 ===
2004 Maharashtra Legislative Assembly election : Rahuri
Party	Candidate	Votes	%	±%
BJP	Chandrashekar Laxmanrao Kadam	70,751	51.32	▲12.73
NCP	Prasadrao Baburao Tanpure	61,020	44.26	▲4.89
BSP	Ahilaji Vitthal Barde	3,272	2.37	New
RSPS	Dhagude Laxman Dasharath	2,818	2.04	New
Margin of victory		9,731	7.06	▲6.28
Turnout		137,882	74.78	▲5.17
Total valid votes		137,861		
Registered electors		184,375		▲11.51
BJP gain from NCP		Swing	▲11.95	

=== Assembly Election 1999 ===
1999 Maharashtra Legislative Assembly election : Rahuri
Party	Candidate	Votes	%	±%
NCP	Prasad Baburao Tanpure	42,148	39.37	New
BJP	Chandrashekhar Laxmanrao Kadam	41,310	38.59	▼1.05
INC	Sabale Raosaheb Kondaji	21,253	19.85	▼19.76
CPI	Govardhan Vishwanath Gholap	1,064	0.99	New
ABS	Jadhav Lata Bhausaheb	884	0.83	New
Margin of victory		838	0.78	▲0.75
Turnout		115,089	69.61	▲15.26
Total valid votes		107,043		
Registered electors		165,337		▲1.16
NCP gain from BJP		Swing	▼0.27	

=== Assembly By-election 1998 ===
1998 Maharashtra Legislative Assembly by-election : Rahuri
Party	Candidate	Votes	%	±%
BJP	Chandrashekhar Laxmanrao Kadam	34,523	39.64	▲32.36
INC	Dhumal Ramdas Vishwanath	34,500	39.61	▼6.03
Independent	Pawar Pandharinath Rambhau	15,059	17.29	New
JD	Dhagude Laxman Dashrath	2,142	2.46	New
Margin of victory		23	0.03	▼3.85
Turnout		88,829	54.35	▼26.30
Total valid votes		87,100		
Registered electors		163,440		▼0.69
BJP gain from INC		Swing	▼6.00	

=== Assembly Election 1995 ===
1995 Maharashtra Legislative Assembly election : Rahuri
Party	Candidate	Votes	%	±%
INC	Prasadrao Baburao Tanpure	59,126	45.64	▼8.21
Independent	Dhumal Ramdas Vishwanath	54,103	41.76	New
BJP	Dhus Asaram Rangnath	9,436	7.28	▼37.13
BBM	Salve Madhukar Motiram	1,688	1.30	New
Independent	Alavane Annasaheb Ananda	1,372	1.06	New
Independent	Dhonde Arun Shrihari	1,127	0.87	New
Margin of victory		5,023	3.88	▼5.56
Turnout		132,734	80.65	▲6.98
Total valid votes		129,549		
Registered electors		164,580		▲13.60
INC hold		Swing	▼8.21	

=== Assembly Election 1990 ===
1990 Maharashtra Legislative Assembly election : Rahuri
Party	Candidate	Votes	%	±%
INC	Prasadrao Baburao Tanpure	56,590	53.85	▲37.57
BJP	Dhumal Ramdas Vishwanath	46,674	44.41	New
JD	Haushinath Vishwanath Poppalghat	871	0.83	New
Margin of victory		9,916	9.44	▼17.65
Turnout		106,735	73.67	▼0.85
Total valid votes		105,091		
Registered electors		144,877		▲22.76
INC gain from Independent		Swing	▼0.66	

=== Assembly Election 1985 ===
1985 Maharashtra Legislative Assembly election : Rahuri
Party	Candidate	Votes	%	±%
Independent	Prasadrao Baburao Tanpure	47,043	54.51	New
IC(S)	Dhumal Ramdas Vishwanath	23,661	27.42	New
INC	Subhash Dattatray Patil	14,051	16.28	New
Independent	Baburao Lahuji Bhosale	1,226	1.42	New
Margin of victory		23,382	27.09	▲23.20
Turnout		87,938	74.52	▲7.89
Total valid votes		86,303		
Registered electors		118,013		▲13.25
Independent gain from INC(I)		Swing	▲4.91	

=== Assembly Election 1980 ===
1980 Maharashtra Legislative Assembly election : Rahuri
Party	Candidate	Votes	%	±%
INC(I)	Prasadrao Baburao Tanpure	33,647	49.60	New
INC(U)	Pawar Kashinath Laxman	31,006	45.71	New
CPI	Jadhav Gangadhar Appaji	2,904	4.28	▼13.52
Margin of victory		2,641	3.89	▼6.60
Turnout		69,434	66.63	▼5.41
Total valid votes		67,831		
Registered electors		104,209		▲11.35
INC(I) gain from INC		Swing	▲3.91	

=== Assembly Election 1978 ===
1978 Maharashtra Legislative Assembly election : Rahuri
Party	Candidate	Votes	%	±%
INC	Kashinath Laxman Pawar	29,866	45.69	▼0.48
JP	Laxmanrao Balwantrao Kadam	23,006	35.19	New
CPI	Punjaji Bapuji Kadu	11,637	17.80	▼35.51
Independent	Deshmukh Bhagwan Ranganath	864	1.32	New
Margin of victory		6,860	10.49	▲3.35
Turnout		67,421	72.04	▲13.18
Total valid votes		65,373		
Registered electors		93,585		▼1.95
INC gain from CPI		Swing	▼7.62	

=== Assembly Election 1972 ===
1972 Maharashtra Legislative Assembly election : Rahuri
Party	Candidate	Votes	%	±%
CPI	Kadu Punjaji Bapuji	28,939	53.31	▲15.56
INC	Wagh Ramanath Laxman	25,064	46.17	▼7.46
Margin of victory		3,875	7.14	▼8.74
Turnout		56,174	58.86	▼6.21
Total valid votes		54,281		
Registered electors		95,444		▲18.74
CPI gain from INC		Swing	▼0.32	

=== Assembly Election 1967 ===
1967 Maharashtra Legislative Assembly election : Rahuri
Party	Candidate	Votes	%	±%
INC	Baburao Bapuji Tanapure	26,320	53.63	▼3.66
CPI	B. G. Thorat	18,525	37.75	▲0.60
ABJS	Laxmanrao Balwantrao Kadam	3,693	7.53	New
Independent	M. G. Adhav	538	1.10	New
Margin of victory		7,795	15.88	▼4.26
Turnout		52,302	65.07	▼2.34
Total valid votes		49,076		
Registered electors		80,383		▲18.05
INC hold		Swing	▼3.66	

=== Assembly Election 1962 ===
1962 Maharashtra Legislative Assembly election : Rahuri
Party	Candidate	Votes	%	±%
INC	Baburao Bapuji Tanapure	24,482	57.29	▲17.64
CPI	Punjaji Bapu Kadu	15,875	37.15	New
Independent	Ramchandra Devkaji Pawar	2,378	5.56	New
Margin of victory		8,607	20.14	▼0.57
Turnout		45,900	67.41	▲31.06
Total valid votes		42,735		
Registered electors		68,091		▲30.83
INC gain from Independent		Swing	▼3.06	

=== Assembly Election 1957 ===
1957 Bombay State Legislative Assembly election : Rahuri
Party	Candidate	Votes	%	±%
Independent	Laxamanrao Madhavrao Patil	11,417	60.35	New
INC	Bankar Jagannathrao Vamanrao	7,500	39.65	▼19.65
Margin of victory		3,917	20.71	▼11.94
Turnout		18,917	36.35	▼7.19
Total valid votes		18,917		
Registered electors		52,044		▼9.35
Independent gain from INC		Swing	▲1.05	

=== Assembly Election 1952 ===
1952 Bombay State Legislative Assembly election : Rahuri
Party	Candidate	Votes	%	±%
INC	Laxamanrao Madhavrao Patil	14,822	59.30	New
CPI	Kadu Punjaji Bapuji	6,660	26.64	New
SCF	Roham Prabhakar Janardhan	3,514	14.06	New
Margin of victory		8,162	32.65	
Turnout		24,996	43.54	
Total valid votes		24,996		
Registered electors		57,414		
INC win (new seat)				
