= Ahmednagar South Assembly constituency =

Former constituency of the Maharashtra legislative assembly in India

Ahmednagar South
- Former constituency for the Maharashtra Legislative Assembly

Constituency details
- Country: India
- Region: Western India
- State: Maharashtra
- District: Ahmednagar
- Lok Sabha constituency: Ahmednagar
- Established: 1957
- Abolished: 2008

Ahmednagar South Vidhan Sabha seat was one of the constituencies of Maharashtra Vidhan Sabha, in India. It was a segment of Ahmednagar Lok Sabha constituency. Ahmednagar South seat existed until the 2004 elections after which it was defunct in 2008.

== Members of Vidhan Sabha ==
Year	Member	Party
1957	Balasaheb alias T. S. Bharde	Indian National Congress
1962	Balasaheb alias T. S. Bharde	Indian National Congress
1967	S. V. Nisal	Indian National Congress
1972	Narayandas Barshikar	Independent
1978	Kumar Saptarshi	Janata Party
1980	Asir S. M. I	Indian National Congress (I)
1985	Dadasaheb Kalamkar	Indian Congress (Socialist)
1990	Anil Rathod	Shiv Sena
1995	Anil Rathod	Shiv Sena
1999	Anil Rathod	Shiv Sena
2004	Anil Rathod	Shiv Sena
2008 onwards: Constituency defunct

== Election results ==
=== Assembly Election 2004 ===
2004 Maharashtra Legislative Assembly election : Ahmednagar South
Party	Candidate	Votes	%	±%
SS	Anil Rathod	78,192	58.32%	▲21.58
NCP	Kalamkar Dadabhau Dasarth Rao	52,742	39.34%	▲18.55
BSP	Thombe Vijay Haribhau	1,541	1.15%	New
Independent	Sayyad Mushtak Ahmed Sayyad Rajasaheb	979	0.73%	New
Margin of victory		25,450	18.98%	▲3.03
Turnout		1,34,075	56.25%	▲4.01
Total valid votes		1,34,072		
Registered electors		2,38,375		▲17.51
SS hold		Swing	▲21.58	

=== Assembly Election 1999 ===
1999 Maharashtra Legislative Assembly election : Ahmednagar South
Party	Candidate	Votes	%	±%
SS	Anil Rathod	38,925	36.74%	▼10.63
NCP	Kalamkar Dadabhau Dasarth Rao	22,026	20.79%	New
INC	Sarda Brijlal Zumbarlal	21,837	20.61%	▼6.79
Independent	Arunkaka Balbhim Jagtap	14,744	13.92%	New
Independent	Gopalrao Madhavrao Zodge (Nana)	4,102	3.87%	New
Independent	Kaware Asaram Haribhau	1,787	1.69%	New
Independent	Darekar Shridhar Jakhuji	1,163	1.10%	New
Margin of victory		16,899	15.95%	▼4.01
Turnout		1,11,188	54.81%	▼14.53
Total valid votes		1,05,950		
Registered electors		2,02,855		▲4.66
SS hold		Swing	▼10.63	

=== Assembly Election 1995 ===
1995 Maharashtra Legislative Assembly election : Ahmednagar South
Party	Candidate	Votes	%	±%
SS	Anil Rathod	61,289	47.37%	▲9.64
INC	Kalamkar Dadabhau Dasarth Rao	35,461	27.41%	▼0.73
Independent	Ghule Shankarrao Haribhau	18,702	14.45%	New
JD	Lamkhade Madhavrao Bhausaheb	2,679	2.07%	▼20.93
Independent	Uttam Sampatrao Kadam	1,754	1.36%	New
Independent	Yemul Mallesham Raymallu	1,448	1.12%	New
RPI	Gangale Krushanrao Genuji	880	0.68%	New
Margin of victory		25,828	19.96%	▲10.37
Turnout		1,31,451	67.82%	▲2.21
Total valid votes		1,29,396		
Registered electors		1,93,818		▲11.26
SS hold		Swing	▲9.64	

=== Assembly Election 1990 ===
1990 Maharashtra Legislative Assembly election : Ahmednagar South
Party	Candidate	Votes	%	±%
SS	Anil Rathod	42,419	37.72%	New
INC	Kalamkar Dadabhau Dasarth Rao	31,638	28.13%	▼4.44
JD	Jagtap Arun Balbhimrao	25,862	23.00%	New
Independent	Barshikar Navnitbhai Narayandas	10,711	9.52%	New
Margin of victory		10,781	9.59%	▼20.44
Turnout		1,13,698	65.27%	▲4.01
Total valid votes		1,12,453		
Registered electors		1,74,209		▲32.23
SS gain from IC(S)		Swing	▼24.87	

=== Assembly Election 1985 ===
1985 Maharashtra Legislative Assembly election : Ahmednagar South
Party	Candidate	Votes	%	±%
IC(S)	Kalamkar Dadabhau Dasarth Rao	49,929	62.60%	New
INC	Asir Shaikh Mohammad Ismail	25,980	32.57%	New
Independent	Garud Shahurao Kisanrao	1,663	2.08%	New
RPI(K)	Sayyed Asharaf Nanbemiya	1,152	1.44%	New
Margin of victory		23,949	30.02%	▲26.51
Turnout		80,887	61.40%	▲5.66
Total valid votes		79,764		
Registered electors		1,31,746		▲9.54
IC(S) gain from INC(I)		Swing	▲16.96	

=== Assembly Election 1980 ===
1980 Maharashtra Legislative Assembly election : Ahmednagar South
Party	Candidate	Votes	%	±%
INC(I)	Asir Shaikh Mohammad Ismail	30,122	45.64%	▲31.69
INC(U)	Paulbudhe Nath Jaywant	27,800	42.12%	New
JP	Mukund Ghaisas	7,971	12.08%	▼15.84
Margin of victory		2,322	3.52%	▲3.01
Turnout		66,963	55.68%	▼12.60
Total valid votes		66,006		
Registered electors		1,20,274		▲19.00
INC(I) gain from JP		Swing	▲17.72	

=== Assembly Election 1978 ===
1978 Maharashtra Legislative Assembly election : Ahmednagar South
Party	Candidate	Votes	%	±%
JP	Kumar Saptarshi	19,039	27.92%	New
INC	Paulbudhe Nath Jaywant	18,691	27.41%	▲0.95
Independent	Barshikar Navnitbhai Narayandas	14,368	21.07%	New
INC(I)	Bedekar Shrikant Ambadas	9,509	13.94%	New
CPI	Ratnakar Ramchandra Krishnaji	5,762	8.45%	▼0.90
Independent	Shaikh Badashaha Chinnubhai	637	0.93%	New
Margin of victory		348	0.51%	▼29.60
Turnout		69,570	68.83%	▲6.81
Total valid votes		68,199		
Registered electors		1,01,073		▲22.10
JP gain from Independent		Swing	▼28.65	

=== Assembly Election 1972 ===
1972 Maharashtra Legislative Assembly election : Ahmednagar South
Party	Candidate	Votes	%	±%
Independent	Barshikar Navnitbhai Narayandas	28,406	56.57%	New
INC	Ranade Kalabai Shriram	13,286	26.46%	▼10.78
CPI	Ramchandra Ratnakar	4,696	9.35%	New
ABJS	Padmakar Deshmukh	2,405	4.79%	▼2.45
RPI(K)	Shinde Ambadas Gangadhar	1,112	2.21%	New
INC(O)	Bodne Mohan Ganesh	308	0.61%	New
Margin of victory		15,120	30.11%	▲26.03
Turnout		51,299	61.97%	▼1.73
Total valid votes		50,213		
Registered electors		82,777		▲16.67
Independent gain from INC		Swing	▲19.33	

=== Assembly Election 1967 ===
1967 Maharashtra Legislative Assembly election : Ahmednagar South
Party	Candidate	Votes	%	±%
INC	S. V. Nisal	16,485	37.24%	▼13.27
Independent	P. K. Bhapkar	14,677	33.16%	New
Independent	N. N. Barshikar	9,900	22.36%	New
ABJS	N. G. Karmakar	3,205	7.24%	▼6.16
Margin of victory		1,808	4.08%	▼10.33
Turnout		47,616	67.11%	▲8.66
Total valid votes		44,267		
Registered electors		70,948		▲11.49
INC hold		Swing	▼13.27	

=== Assembly Election 1962 ===
1962 Maharashtra Legislative Assembly election : Ahmednagar South
Party	Candidate	Votes	%	±%
INC	Trimbak Shivram Bharde	17,270	50.51%	▼5.96
Independent	Navashervan Navarozaji Sattha	12,341	36.09%	New
ABJS	Ramayya Dagadu Adep	4,582	13.40%	New
Margin of victory		4,929	14.42%	▲1.49
Turnout		36,877	57.95%	▼5.81
Total valid votes		34,193		
Registered electors		63,639		▲14.58
INC hold		Swing	▼5.96	

=== Assembly Election 1957 ===
1957 Bombay State Legislative Assembly election : Ahmednagar South
Party	Candidate	Votes	%	±%
INC	Trimbak Shivram Bharde	18,674	56.46%	New
Independent	Ranade Kamala Shriram	14,398	43.54%	New
Margin of victory		4,276	12.93%	
Turnout		33,072	59.54%	
Total valid votes		33,072		
Registered electors		55,542		
INC win (new seat)				

== See also ==
- List of constituencies of Maharashtra Legislative Assembly
