= Akshay Kardile =

Indian politician from Maharashtra

Maharashtra Legislative Assembly
- Incumbent
- Assumed office 4 May 2026
- Constituency: Rahuri

Personal details
- Party: Bharatiya Janata Party
- Occupation: Politician

Akshay Kardile is an Indian politician who is currently serving as member of Legislative Assembly (MLA) in Maharashtra Legislative assembly.

He represents the Rahuri constituency in Ahilyanagar district, and is a member of the Bharatiya Janata Party. He entered active politics following the death of his father Shivaji Bhanudas Kardile.

He won the Rahuri constituency seat in the by-election held in April 2026.
