= Ahmednagar North Assembly constituency =

Former constituency of the Maharashtra legislative assembly in India

Ahmednagar North
- Former constituency for the Maharashtra Legislative Assembly

Constituency details
- Country: India
- Region: Western India
- State: Maharashtra
- District: Ahmednagar
- Lok Sabha constituency: Ahmednagar
- Established: 1955
- Abolished: 2008
- Reservation: None

Ahmednagar North Vidhan Sabha seat was one of the constituencies of Maharashtra Vidhan Sabha, in India. It was a segment of Ahmednagar Lok Sabha constituency. Ahmednagar North seat existed until the 2004 elections after which it was defunct in 2008.

== Members of the Legislative Assembly ==
Year	Member	Party
1957	Prabhakar Bhapkar	Independent
1962	Balasaheb Nagwade	Independent
1967	Kisanrao Mhaske alias Kakasaheb Mhaske	Indian National Congress
1972	Kisanrao Mhaske alias Kakasaheb Mhaske	Indian National Congress
1978	Maruti Shelke alias Dada Patil Shelke	Independent
1980	Maruti Shelke alias Dada Patil Shelke	Indian National Congress (I)
1985	Maruti Shelke alias Dada Patil Shelke	Indian National Congress
1990	Maruti Shelke alias Dada Patil Shelke	Indian National Congress
1995	Shivaji Kardile	Independent
1999	Shivaji Kardile	Independent
2004	Shivaji Kardile	Nationalist Congress Party
2008 onwards: Constituency defunct

== Election results ==
=== Assembly Election 2004 ===
2004 Maharashtra Legislative Assembly election : Ahmednagar North
Party	Candidate	Votes	%	±%
NCP	Shivaji Bhanudas Kardile	76,436	42.49%	▲8.15
Independent	Shelke Maruti Deoram	44,591	24.79%	New
SS	Prof. Shashikant Madhavrao Gade (Sir)	38,273	21.27%	New
BSP	Dusunge Uddhav Maruti	10,064	5.59%	New
Independent	Dr.Mhaske Subhash Kisanrao	2,414	1.34%	New
Independent	Sayyed Mushtaq Ahmed Sayyed Rajasab	2,410	1.34%	New
Independent	Kardile Shivaji Dhondiram	1,540	0.86%	New
Margin of victory		31,845	17.70%	▲7.99
Turnout		1,79,946	68.26%	▲2.84
Total valid votes		1,79,901		
Registered electors		2,63,605		▲19.45
NCP gain from Independent		Swing	▼1.56	

=== Assembly Election 1999 ===
1999 Maharashtra Legislative Assembly election : Ahmednagar North
Party	Candidate	Votes	%	±%
Independent	Shivaji Bhanudas Kardile	63,576	44.05%	New
NCP	Shankarrao Yashwantrao Gadakh Patil	49,562	34.34%	New
INC	Bhanudas Eknath Kotkar	30,179	20.91%	▼2.77
Margin of victory		14,014	9.71%	▼7.94
Turnout		1,54,866	70.17%	▼6.48
Total valid votes		1,44,334		
Registered electors		2,20,689		▲4.81
Independent hold		Swing	▲2.72	

=== Assembly Election 1995 ===
1995 Maharashtra Legislative Assembly election : Ahmednagar North
Party	Candidate	Votes	%	±%
Independent	Shivaji Bhanudas Kardile	62,552	41.33%	New
INC	Kute Vijayatai Chandrakant	35,838	23.68%	▼31.41
SS	Bhalasing Goraksha Ranganath	32,709	21.61%	▲8.39
CPI	Avhad Namdeorao Chandraji	5,023	3.32%	New
Independent	Gaikwad Ashok Ramchandra	3,316	2.19%	New
Independent	Kalamkar Kantilal Kisan	2,667	1.76%	New
BSP	Khan Samiulla Alias Samir Nasirkhan	2,462	1.63%	New
Margin of victory		26,714	17.65%	▼9.47
Turnout		1,56,182	74.17%	▲8.87
Total valid votes		1,51,363		
Registered electors		2,10,561		▲14.98
Independent gain from INC		Swing	▼13.77	

=== Assembly Election 1990 ===
1990 Maharashtra Legislative Assembly election : Ahmednagar North
Party	Candidate	Votes	%	±%
INC	Shelke Maruti Deoram	63,577	55.09%	▼1.21
JD	Mule Madhavrao Dagduji	32,281	27.97%	New
SS	Rajendra Appasaheb Shinde	15,259	13.22%	New
Independent	Adhav Laxman Keru	1,266	1.10%	New
INS(SCS)	Khakal Pandurang Chimaji	953	0.83%	New
Margin of victory		31,296	27.12%	▼8.32
Turnout		1,17,862	64.36%	▲7.46
Total valid votes		1,15,402		
Registered electors		1,83,125		▲24.15
INC hold		Swing	▼1.21	

=== Assembly Election 1985 ===
1985 Maharashtra Legislative Assembly election : Ahmednagar North
Party	Candidate	Votes	%	±%
INC	Shelke Maruti Deoram	46,137	56.30%	New
IC(S)	Ashok Sambhaji Rao Babat	17,096	20.86%	New
Independent	Bansibhau Revaji Mhaske	16,266	19.85%	New
RPI	Vishnu Anandrao Badekar	1,032	1.26%	New
Independent	Sonyabapu Rambhau Berad	712	0.87%	New
Margin of victory		29,041	35.44%	▲9.27
Turnout		83,988	56.94%	▲8.45
Total valid votes		81,949		
Registered electors		1,47,507		▲12.68
INC gain from INC(I)		Swing	▼5.26	

=== Assembly Election 1980 ===
1980 Maharashtra Legislative Assembly election : Ahmednagar North
Party	Candidate	Votes	%	±%
INC(I)	Shelke Maruti Deoram	37,958	61.56%	▲48.61
INC(U)	Haral Kisanrao Rajaram	21,821	35.39%	New
JP(S)	Zine Marutirao Sarjerao	1,170	1.90%	New
Independent	Avhad Bhagchand Bhau	710	1.15%	New
Margin of victory		16,137	26.17%	▲4.05
Turnout		63,400	48.43%	▼17.41
Total valid votes		61,659		
Registered electors		1,30,906		▲12.27
INC(I) gain from Independent		Swing	▲13.95	

=== Assembly Election 1978 ===
1978 Maharashtra Legislative Assembly election : Ahmednagar North
Party	Candidate	Votes	%	±%
Independent	Shelke Maruti Deoram	35,820	47.62%	New
INC	Mhaske Kisanrao Balaji	19,177	25.49%	▼40.50
JP	Kardile Bhausaheb Laxman	10,286	13.67%	New
INC(I)	Dhivar Damodhar Chokhaji	9,743	12.95%	New
Margin of victory		16,643	22.12%	▼9.85
Turnout		78,009	66.90%	▲13.53
Total valid votes		75,227		
Registered electors		1,16,604		▲23.45
Independent gain from INC		Swing	▼18.37	

=== Assembly Election 1972 ===
1972 Maharashtra Legislative Assembly election : Ahmednagar North
Party	Candidate	Votes	%	±%
INC	Mhaske Kisanrao Balaji	31,779	65.99%	▲19.72
CPI	Mhaske Banshi Revji	16,380	34.01%	▲1.27
Margin of victory		15,399	31.98%	▲18.45
Turnout		49,947	52.88%	▼8.83
Total valid votes		48,159		
Registered electors		94,457		▲16.59
INC hold		Swing	▲19.72	

=== Assembly Election 1967 ===
1967 Maharashtra Legislative Assembly election : Ahmednagar North
Party	Candidate	Votes	%	±%
INC	Mhaske Kisanrao Balaji	22,421	46.27%	▲2.64
CPI	Balasaheb Nabaji Nagwade	15,866	32.74%	New
Independent	T. B. Bothe	8,443	17.42%	New
Independent	B. K. Badakar	1,730	3.57%	New
Margin of victory		6,555	13.53%	▲5.01
Turnout		51,151	63.14%	▲5.71
Total valid votes		48,460		
Registered electors		81,014		▲17.99
INC gain from Independent		Swing	▼5.88	

=== Assembly Election 1962 ===
1962 Maharashtra Legislative Assembly election : Ahmednagar North
Party	Candidate	Votes	%	±%
Independent	Balasaheb Nabaji Nagwade	19,372	52.14%	New
INC	Vithalrao Ganpatrao Kute	16,208	43.63%	▲13.30
PSP	Bhaskar Kondaji Padir	1,572	4.23%	New
Margin of victory		3,164	8.52%	▼21.47
Turnout		39,394	57.37%	▲10.97
Total valid votes		37,152		
Registered electors		68,663		▲15.03
Independent hold		Swing	▼8.17	

=== Assembly Election 1957 ===
1957 Bombay State Legislative Assembly election : Ahmednagar North
Party	Candidate	Votes	%	±%
Independent	Bhapkar Prabhakar Kondji	15,530	60.32%	New
INC	Kute Vithal Ganpat	7,809	30.33%	New
Independent	Bhalerao Pandurang Narayan	1,697	6.59%	New
Independent	Shinde Ramrao Haribhau	712	2.77%	New
Margin of victory		7,721	29.99%	
Turnout		25,748	43.14%	
Total valid votes		25,748		
Registered electors		59,690		
Independent win (new seat)				

== See also ==
- List of constituencies of Maharashtra Legislative Assembly
