= Rahuri taluka =

Rahuri
- Tehsil
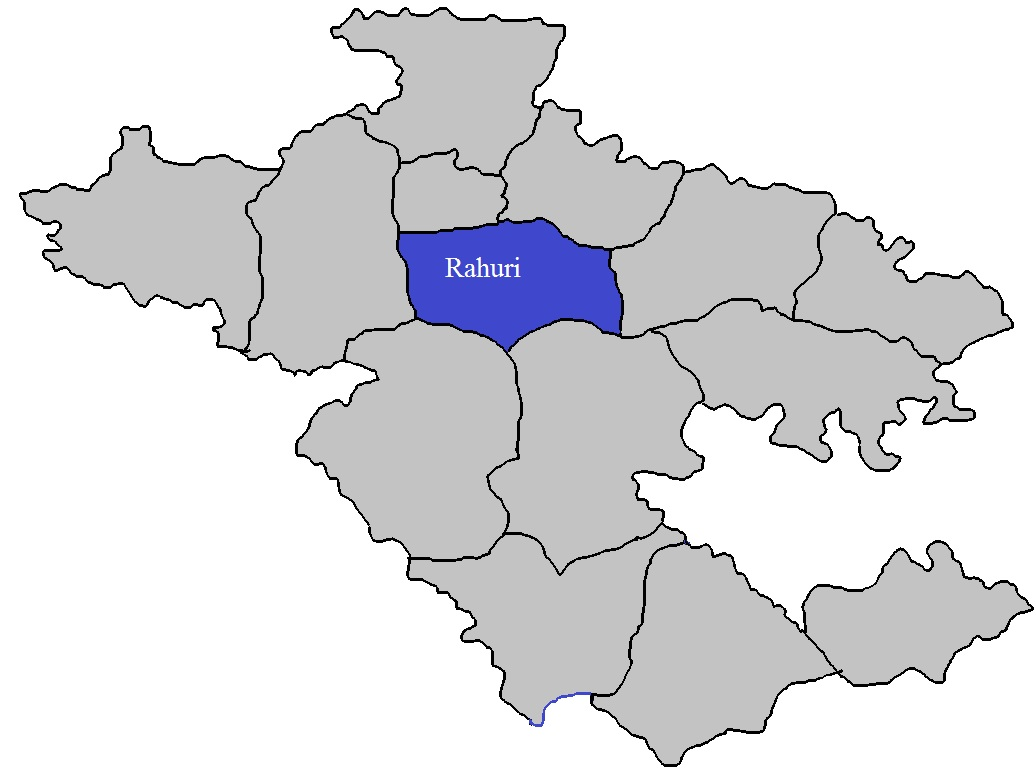
- Location of Rahuri in Ahmednagar district in Maharashtra
- Country: India
- State: Maharashtra
- District: Ahmednagar district
- Headquarters: Shrirampur

Government
  - Lok Sabha constituency: ahmednagar south
  - Assembly constituency: rahuri
  - MLA: Akshay Shivaji Kardile

Area
  - Total: 1,035.11 km^{2} (399.66 sq mi)

Population (2011)
  - Total: 322,823
  - Density: 311.873/km^{2} (807.748/sq mi)

Demographics
  - Literacy rate: 73.78
- Rain: 455 mm

Rahuri taluka, is a taluka in the Shrirampur subdivision of the Ahmednagar district in Maharashtra, western India.

== Area by land use ==
Type of Land	Area (km^{2})	% of Total Area
Agriculture	766.09	74.01
Forest	157.06	15.17
Other	111.96	10.82
Total	1035.11	100

== Rivers ==
The Mula River flows through Rahuri.

== Villages ==
For a list of villages, see villages in Rahuri taluka.

There are at least 96 villages in Rahuri taluka.

Malharwadi is a village in Rahuri Taluka. It belongs to Nashik Division. It is located 38 km towards North from District headquarters Ahmednagar,10 km from Rahuri Khurd and 218 km from the state capital Mumbai.

Malharwadi Pin code is 413705 and postal head office is Rahuri Town.

Momin Akhada ( 3 km ), Digras ( 5 km ), Baragaon Nandur ( 5 km ), Birobanagar ( 6 km ), Rahuri Khurd ( 6 km ) are the nearby Villages to Malharwadi. Malharwadi is surrounded by Shrirampur Taluka towards North, Ahmednagar Taluka towards South, Rahata Taluka towards North, Nagar Taluka towards South

Ghorpadwadi is a village in Rahuri Taluka in Ahmednagar District of Maharashtra, India. It is in the region of Khandesh and Northern Maharashtra and is a part of the Nashik Division. It is located 39 km north of the district headquarters of Ahmednagar, 11 km from Rahuri Khurd and 217 km from Mumbai. Its exports include vegetables, such as onions and brinjal. Approximately 80% of the land is dedicated to agricultural purposes. Its major associating active group is |jai bajrang yuva pratisthan. |

Ghorpadwadi's Pin code is 413705 and the postal head office is at Rahuri town.

Nearby villages include Momin Akhada (3 km), Baragaon Nandur (4 km), Digras (6 km), Chinchvihire (7 km), Birobanagar (7 km), Vambori (19.5 km). Ghorpadwadi is surrounded by Shrirampur Taluka to the North, Ahmednagar Taluka and Nagar Taluka to the South and Rahata Taluka to the East.

Rahuri, Shrirampur, Ahmednagar, Sangamner, Belapur are nearby cities to Ghorpadwadi.

=== Ghorpadwadi 2011 Census Details ===
Ghorpadwadi's local language is Marathi. Its total population is 1509, and it has 259 houses. 48.2% of the population is female. The village's literacy rate is 63%, and the female literacy rate is 25.5%.

=== Vambori ===
Places to visit in Vambori are Dongargan, Bhairavji temple, gorakhksyanath temple, ostwal farmhouse.

=== Politics in Ghorpadwadi ===
The area's major political parties are BJP, NCP and SHS.

==== Polling Stations and Booths near Ghorpadwadi ====
- Malewadi Dlukrewadi Z.p. School East West Building West Side Room No. 2
- Ghatshiras Z.p. School East West Building West Side Room No. 1
- Mokal Ohal Z.p. School East West Building West Side Room No. 2
- Momin Akhada Z.p. School East West Building West Side Room No. 1
- Vambori Mahesh Munot Vidyalaya South North (west Side Old Building ) South Side Room No. 3

=== Travel to Ghorpadwadi ===
==== By Road ====
Rahuri is the nearest town to Ghorpadwadi, 8 km (5 miles) away.

==== By Rail ====
Ghorpadwadi is also accessible by rail from Rahuri. The remaining 8 km (5 miles) to Ghorpadwadi must be traveled by road. Aurangabad, 103 km (64 miles) from Ghorpadwadi, is another rail link.

=== Schools in Ghorpadwadi ===
Z.p.p.school Ghorpadwadi Address : ghorpadwadi, rahuri, ahmadnagar, Maharashtra. PIN- 413705, Post - Rahuri Town

== Population ==
Religions in Rahuri taluk (2011)
Religion	Percent
Hinduism	91.64%
Islam	6.83%
Jainism	0.54%
Christianity	0.48%
Other or not stated	0.51%

Rahuri taluka has a population of 322,823 according to the 2011 census. Rahuri had a literacy rate of 79.74% and a sex ratio of 934 females per 1000 males. 69,810 (21.62%) live in urban areas. Scheduled Castes and Scheduled Tribes make up 13.51% and 10.54% of the population respectively.

Languages of Rahuri taluk (2011)
1. Marathi (90.8%)
2. Hindi (5.36%)
3. Urdu (1.32%)
4. Others (2.56%)

At the time of the 2011 Census of India, 90.76% of the population in the district spoke Marathi, 5.36% Hindi and 1.32% Urdu as their first language.

== Rainfall ==
The table below lists rainfall from 1981 to 2004.

Year	Rainfall (mm)
1981	639
1982	434
1983	665
1984	427
1985	301
1986	242
1987	533
1988	725
1989	524
1990	788
1991	466
1992	407
1993	548
1994	455
1995	642
1996	555
1997	345
1998	585
1999	581
2000	587
2001	358
2002	302
2003	299
2004	509

== Universities and colleges ==
- Mahatma Phule Krishi Vidyapeeth

== See also ==
- Talukas in Ahmednagar district
- Villages in Rahuri taluka
