= The Journey Home: Autobiography of an American Swami =

2008 autobiography by Radhanath Swami

- The Journey Home cover
- Author: Radhanath Swami
- Language: English
- Subject: Autobiography, Memoir
- Genre: Non-fiction
- Published: 2008 Mandala Publishing
- Publication place: United States of America
- Media type: Print (Hardback)
- Pages: 350
- ISBN: 978-1-60109-044-7
- OCLC: 587143277
- Website: www.thejourneyhomebook.net

The Journey Home: Autobiography of an American Swami is a 2008 auto-biographical account of a young nineteen-year-old boy, Richard Slavin's journey from the suburbs of Chicago to the caves of the Himalayas and through this, his transformation to being Radhanath Swami, one of India's most respected spiritual leaders and an ISKCON figure. Mystic yogi's, gurus and an epic quest through spiritual India, is a concise description of this memoir. Within his autobiography, Radhanth Swami is seeming to weave a colorful tapestry of adventure, mysticism and love.

== Overview ==
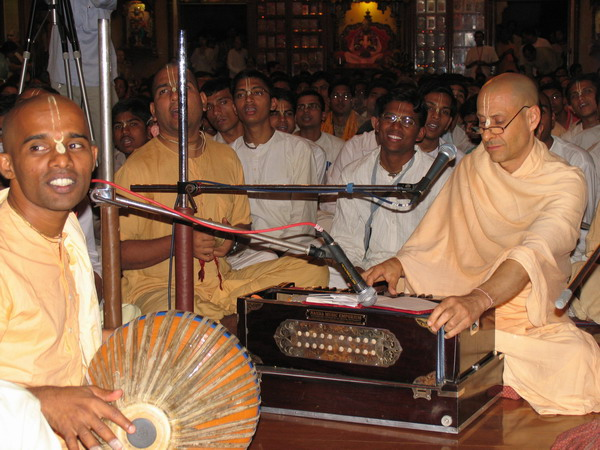
Author Radhanath Swami in Mumbai, 2006

Readers follow Richard Slavin (born December 7, 1950) from the suburbs of Chicago to the inner sanctums of Vrindavan as he transforms from a young seeker to a renowned spiritual guide. The Journey Home is an intimate account of the steps to self-realization and also a penetrating glimpse into the heart of mystic traditions and the challenges that all souls must face on the road to inner harmony and a union with the Divine . Through near-death encounters, apprenticeships with advanced yogis and years of travel along the pilgrim's path, Radhanath Swami eventually reaches the inner sanctum of India's mystic culture and finds the love he has been seeking.

This book is rated 11+ as the book is about his search for an inner essence of what life is about, Radhanath Swami interacted and learned from various spiritual teachers, such as Mother Teresa, renowned yogi Swami Rama, and his guru (spiritual master), founder of the Hare Krishna Movement Srila A. C. Bhaktivedanta Swami Prabhupada, to whom this memoir is dedicated.

Over the years, the book has been translated into several languages including Hindi, Chinese, German, Slovenian and Russian, besides as an audiobook in English.

== Published Reviews ==
- Namarupa Magazine, Review by Rachael Stark
- America Magazine, Review by Francis Xavier Clooney, S.J., Professor at Harvard Divinity School

== News Interviews with Author Radhanath Swami ==
- Fox News Interview - Seattle
- NBC Noon News Interview - Hartford Interview
- CBC Better Connecticut News Interview

== See also ==
- Mother Teresa
- Swami Rama
- Swami Satchidananda
- 14th Dalai Lama
- Neem Karoli Baba
- A. C. Bhaktivedanta Swami Prabhupada
- Mother Ganga
