= Mastani Mahal =

Coordinates: 25°00′29″N 79°28′49″E

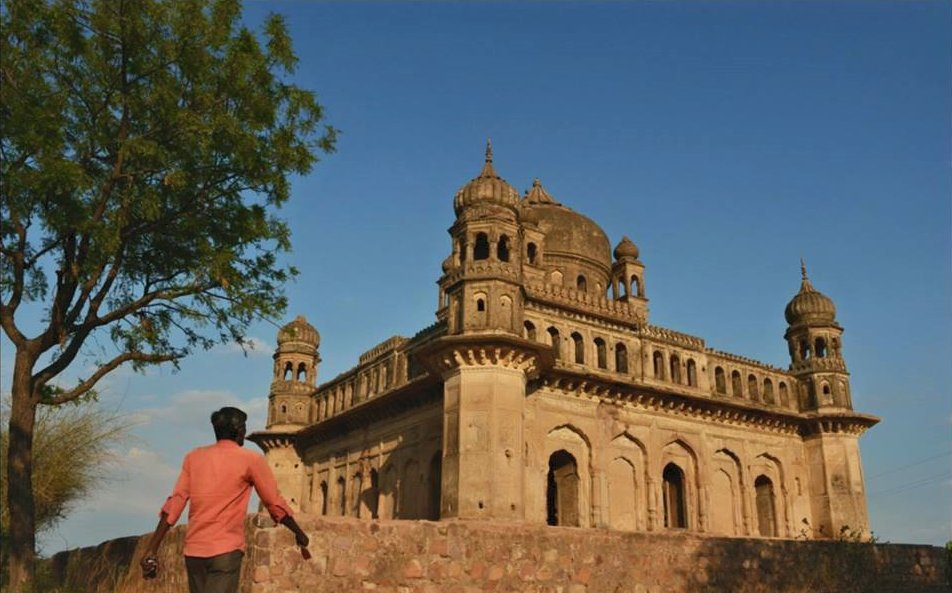

General information
- Location: Dhubela, Chhatarpur District, Madhya Pradesh, India
- Year built: 1696

The Mastani Mahal is a palace in Dhubela, Madhya Pradesh. The palace was built by Raja Chhattrasal for his daughter, Mastani.

== History and architecture ==
The palace was built in 1696 for Mastani, the daughter of Raja Chhatrasal and Ruhaani Bai Begum.She and her father were followers of the Hindu Pranami Sampradaya sect based on Bhakti worship of Krishna, but she was also a follower of Sunni islam like her mother. In 1729, Raja Chhatrasal gave Bajirao I his daughter's hand in marriage in graditude of his victory against Muhammad Khan Bhangash, and Mastani became his secondary wife. Bajirao had built her a palace in the Shaniwar Wada which was also called Mastani Mahal.

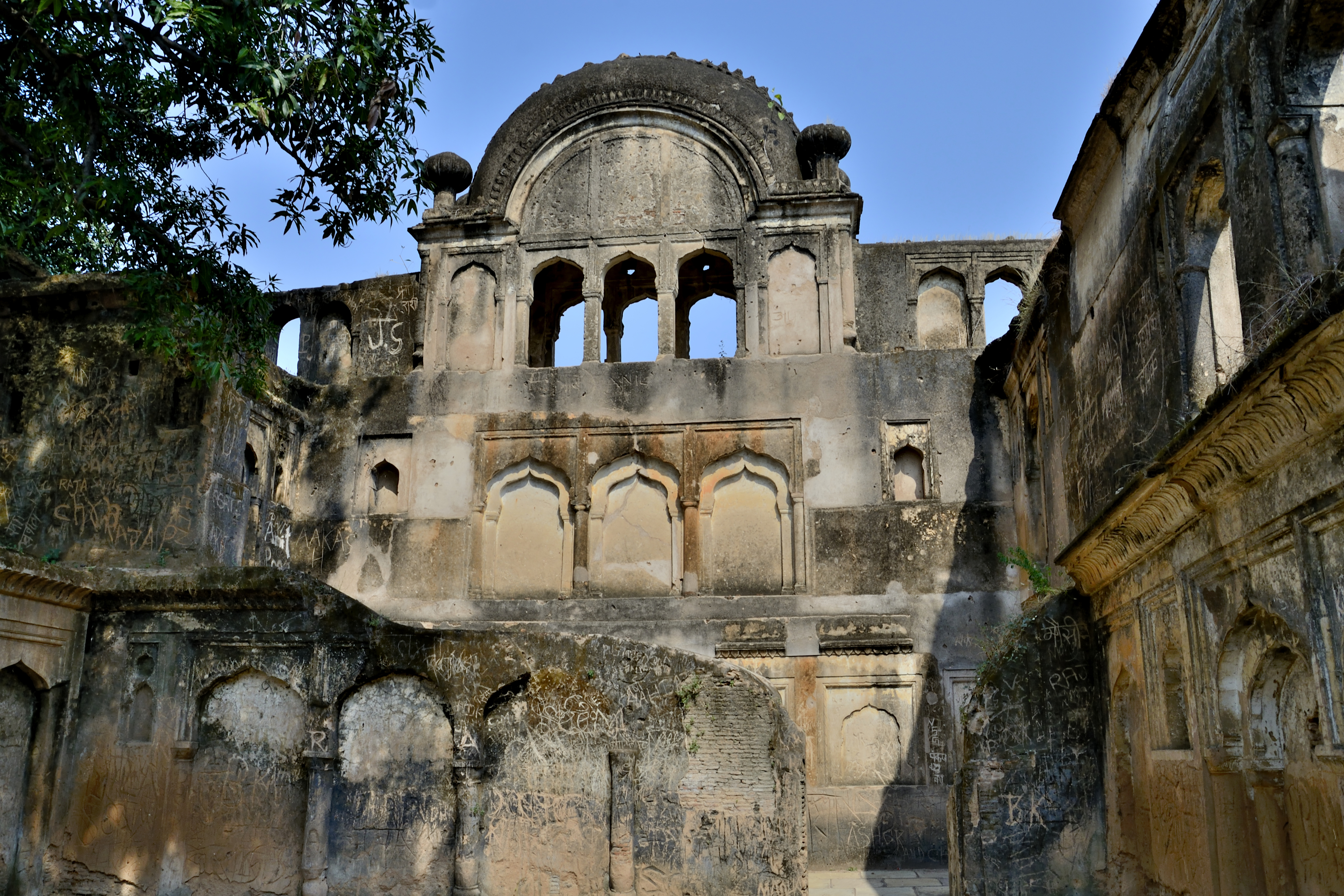
Interior courtyard of the Mastani Mahal.

The palace, which is built in characteristic Bundeli architecture is two storeyed, with a spacious courtyard, and several chambers. It also had access to the Chhatrasal Mahal and is built adjacent to it.

== See also ==
- Maharaja Chhatrasal Museum
