= Battle of Bundelkhand =

1729 Maratha–Mughal battle

Battle of Jaitpur
- Part of Decline of the Mughal Empire
Date	March 1729
Location	Jaitpur, Bundelkhand
Result	Maratha–Rajput victory
Territorial changes	Mughals lost control over Bundelkhand and Chhatrasal gifted one-third of the kingdom to the Maratha Empire.

Belligerents
Panna State; Maratha Empire	Mughal Empire

Commanders and leaders
Chhatrasal; Peshwa Bajirao I Chimaji Appa	Muhammad Khan Bangash (surrendered); Qaim Khan Bangash

Strength
Total: 40,000 troops: 20,000 Maratha cavalry; 20,000 Rajput cavalry	Total: 60,000 troops: 25,000 under Muhammad Bangash; 35,000 under Qaim Bangash

Casualties and losses
Unknown but minimum	Unknown but large number of dead and wounded; 6,000 horses and 55 elephants captured

The Battle of Jaitpur was fought between the Maratha Empire under Peshwa Baji Rao I, on behalf of Chhatrasal Bundela, the ruler of Bundelkhand; and the Mughal Empire under Muhammad Khan Bangash in March 1729. Bangash attacked the state of Bundelkhand in December 1728. Being too old to fight, as well as heavily outnumbered, Chhatrasal appealed to Baji Rao for assistance - under whose leadership the Maratha with 25,000 horsemen with the Bundela troops defeated the Muhammad khan Bangash.

== Background ==
In Bundelkhand, Chhatrasal had rebelled against the Mughal Empire and established an independent kingdom. In December 1728, a Mughal force led by Muhammad Khan Bangash attacked him and besieged his fort and family. Although Chhatrasal repeatedly sought Baji Rao's assistance, he was busy in Malwa at the time. He compared his dire situation to that of Gajendra Moksha. In his letter to Baji Rao, Chhatrasal wrote the following words:

Know you, that I am in the same sad plight in which the famous elephant was when caught by the crocodile. My valiant race is on point of extinction. Come and save my honour, O Baji Rao.

== Battle ==
After marching to Jaitpur, Bajirao surrounded Muhammad Khan Bangash and cut off his supplies as well as communication lines to Delhi and Allahabad. Bangash launched a counterattack against Baji Rao, but could not pierce his defences. Qaim Khan, son of Muhammad Khan Bangash, learned of his father's predicament and approached with fresh troops. His army was attacked by Bajirao's forces, and he was defeated. Bangash then sought forgiveness and surrendered, signing an agreement and promise that he would never suppress the independence of Bundelkhand again.

== Aftermath ==
Chhatrasal's position as ruler of Bundelkhand was restored. He gifted one-third of his state to the Peshwa and gave him his daughter from a concubine named Ruhani Bai, Mastani. Before Chhatrasal's death in December 1731, he ceded one-third of his territories to the Marathas.
