= Mastani Lake =

Lake in Maharashtra, India

Matani Lake
- Location within Maharashtra
- Location: Pune, Maharashtra
- Coordinates: 18°24′56″N 74°28′42″E
- Type: freshwater
- Basin countries: India
- Settlements: Pune

Mastani Lake, also known as Mastani Talab or Wadki Talab, is situated near Wadki village, Pune, in the state of Maharashtra, India. The construction started during the reign of Bajirao Peshwa.

== History ==
The water reservoir was built around 1720. Two lovers, Bajirao and Mastani kept visiting the lake. Later, the lake name changed to Mastani Talab. The lake was considered to be the bathing spot of Mastani Bai. It was constructed under Bajirao. After Bajirao's death, it was completed in the reign of Peshwa Nanasaheb. Before his demise, Bajirao also started constructing walls around the lake but it was not finished entirely. Later, after 300 years, the walls were built.

== Geography ==
Mastani Lake is spread over an area of 14 acres (5.7 ha). The water reservoir sits in the middle of green hills. Two temples are located around the lake.

== See also ==
- Bajirao
- Bajirao Mastani
- Mastani
