= Ruhani Bai Begum =

- Ruhani Bai
- Spouse: Chhatrasal
- Issue: Mastani
- House: Bundela (by marriage)
- Religion: Sunni Islam

Ruhani Bai Begum (also spelled as Ruhaani Bai Begum) was the chief consort of Bundela Rajput ruler Chhatrasal, ruler of Panna from 1675 to 1731.

== Mastani’s marriage ==
Ruhaani was of Persian Muslim descent.

In 1728, when Muhammad Khan Bangash invaded Chhatrasal's kingdom and besieged his capital. Chhatrasal wrote to Maratha Peshwa Bajirao I for help but being occupied in a military campaign Bajirao could not respond until 1729, when he finally marched on towards Bundelkhand. Ultimately Bajirao defeated Bangash after reaching Jaitpur near Kulpahar in present Uttar Pradesh.

In gratitude, Chhatrasal gave Bajirao the hand of Mastani, his daughter with his concubine Ruhani Begum, along with dominion over Jhansi, Sagar and Kalpi.

At first Ruhani Begum was against the marriage of her daughter Mastani with Bajirao I as Mastani was half-Muslim. She was concerned that her daughter may be discriminated for being a follower of Sunni Islam, whereas Bajirao was a Hindu Brahmin. However, Ruhani Begum accepted this marriage later on the advice of her husband, that Mastani was also a half-Hindu and being a follower of the Pranami Sampradaya will not treated with any discrimination.

== In popular culture ==
=== In film and television ===
- Zila Khan portrayed Ruhaani Bai Begum in the historical epic film Bajirao Mastani (2015).
- Dolly Sohi portrayed Begum in the TV series Peshwa Bajirao.
- Rudrakshi Gupta portrayed Begum in the TV series Kashibai Bajirao Ballal.

=== In literature ===
- Begum is a character in Niranjan Mudholkar's historical fiction novel The Kingdom of God.

== See also ==
- Anara Begum
