= Maharaja Chhatrasal Museum =

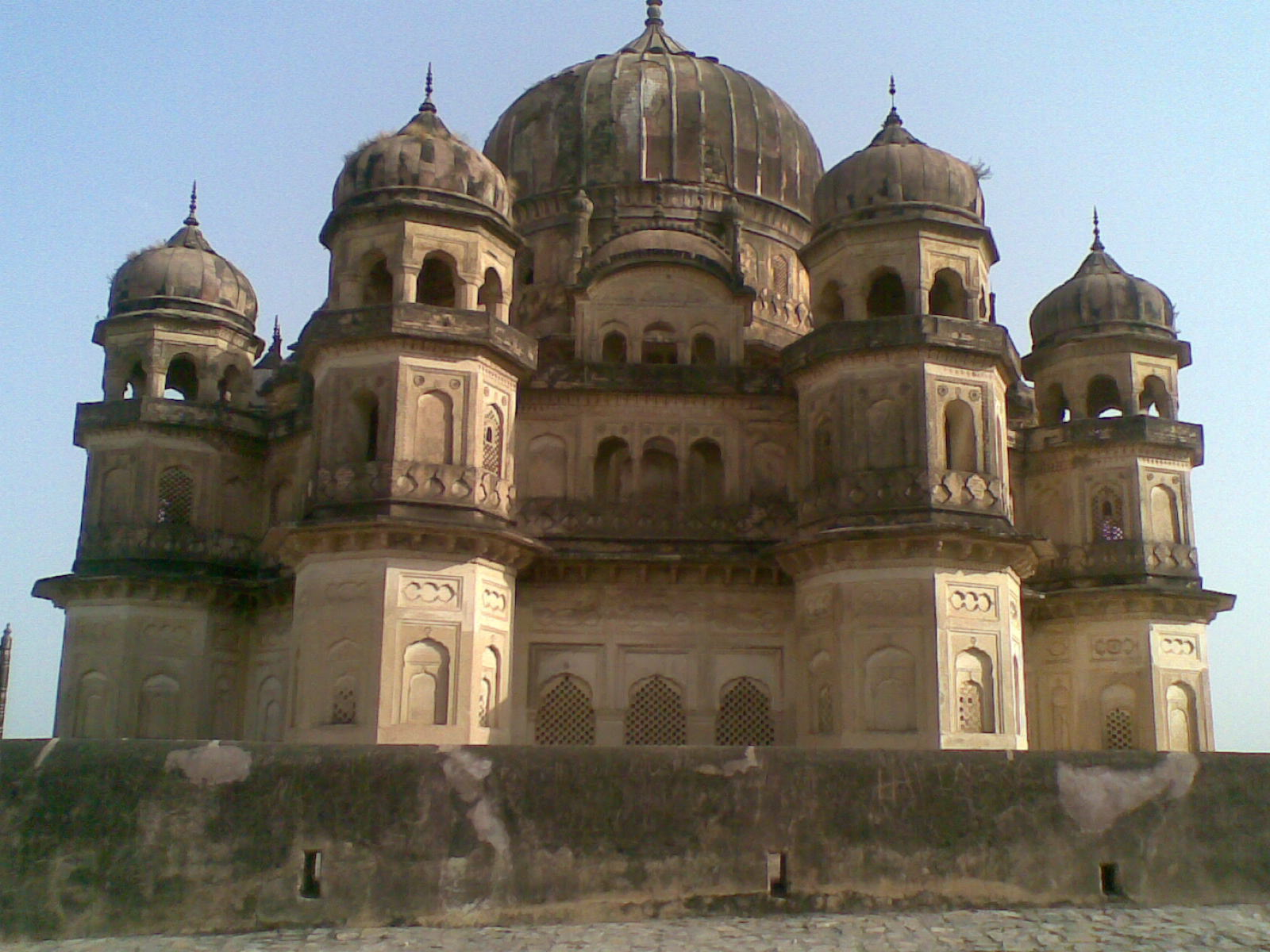

- Location within Madhya Pradesh Location within India
- Location: Dhubela, Chhatarpur District, Madhya Pradesh, India
- Coordinates: 25.0079847°N 79.4797111°E

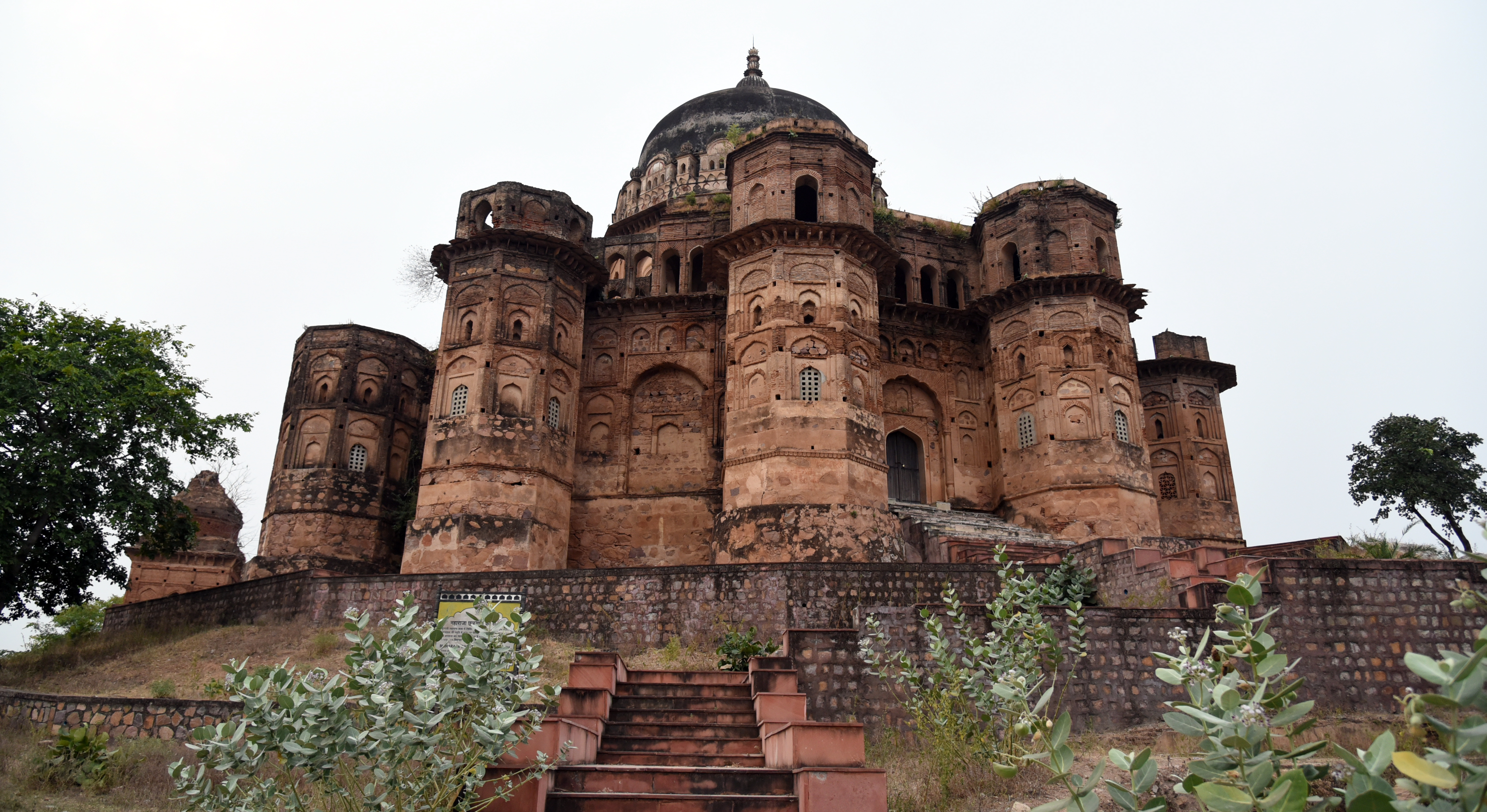
Maharaja Chhatrasal's Cenotaph, Dhubela, Built by Baji Rao Peshwa in 1736

Maharaja Chhatrasal Museum is a museum located in an old palace at Dhubela, on the Chhatarpur-Jhansi highway, in Chhatarpur District, Madhya Pradesh, India. This museum was established in September, 1955 in a palace built by Chhatrasal for his residence. Presently, the museum comprises 8 galleries, of which two galleries display inscriptions, copper plates, Sati pillars, lingas and inscribed images of the Gupta and Kalachuri period. The museum houses a wide range of sculptures of the Shakti cult. It also has a significant collection of Jaina images. It also displays the garments, weapons and paintings of the Bundela kings.

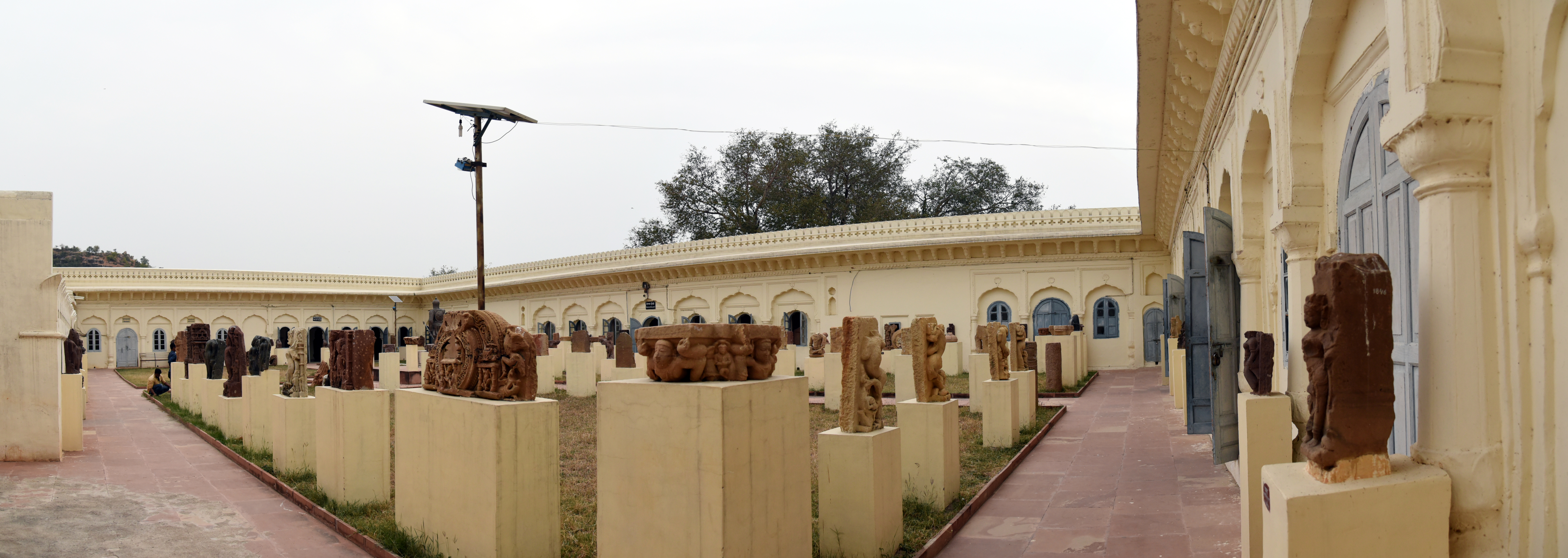
Open air Gallery, Maharaja Chhatrasal Museum, Dhubela

The Dhubela Museum is located at Dhubela on the Chhatarpur-Nowgaon highway, 15 km from Chhatarpur and 62 km from Khajuraho. This place can be reached from Khajuraho by road.

== Images ==
The museum houses a number of Jaina images depicting the Jaina Tirthankaras (Teaching Gods).

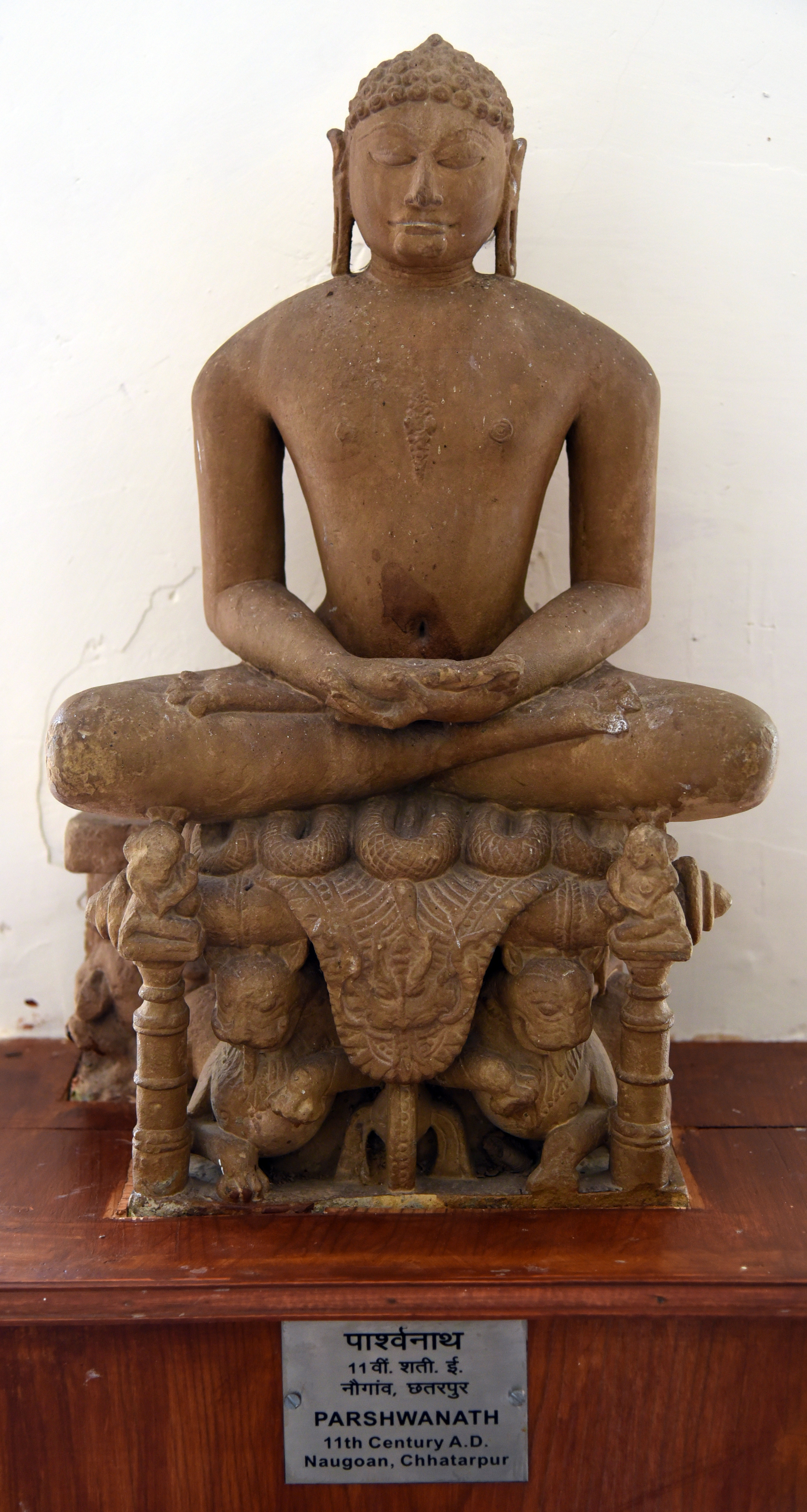
Image of Tirthankara Parshvanatha, 11th Century

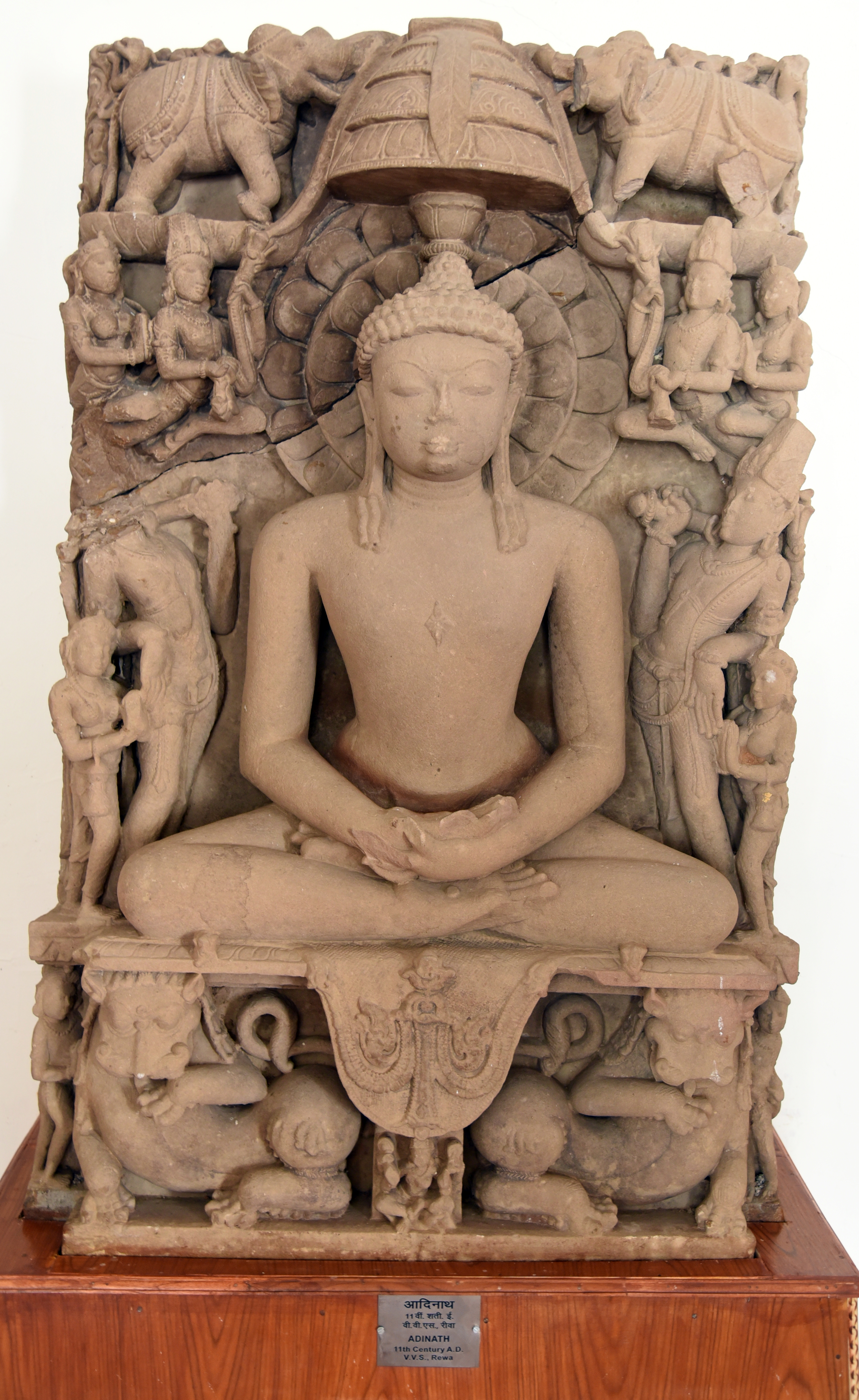
Image of Rishabhanatha, 10th Century.

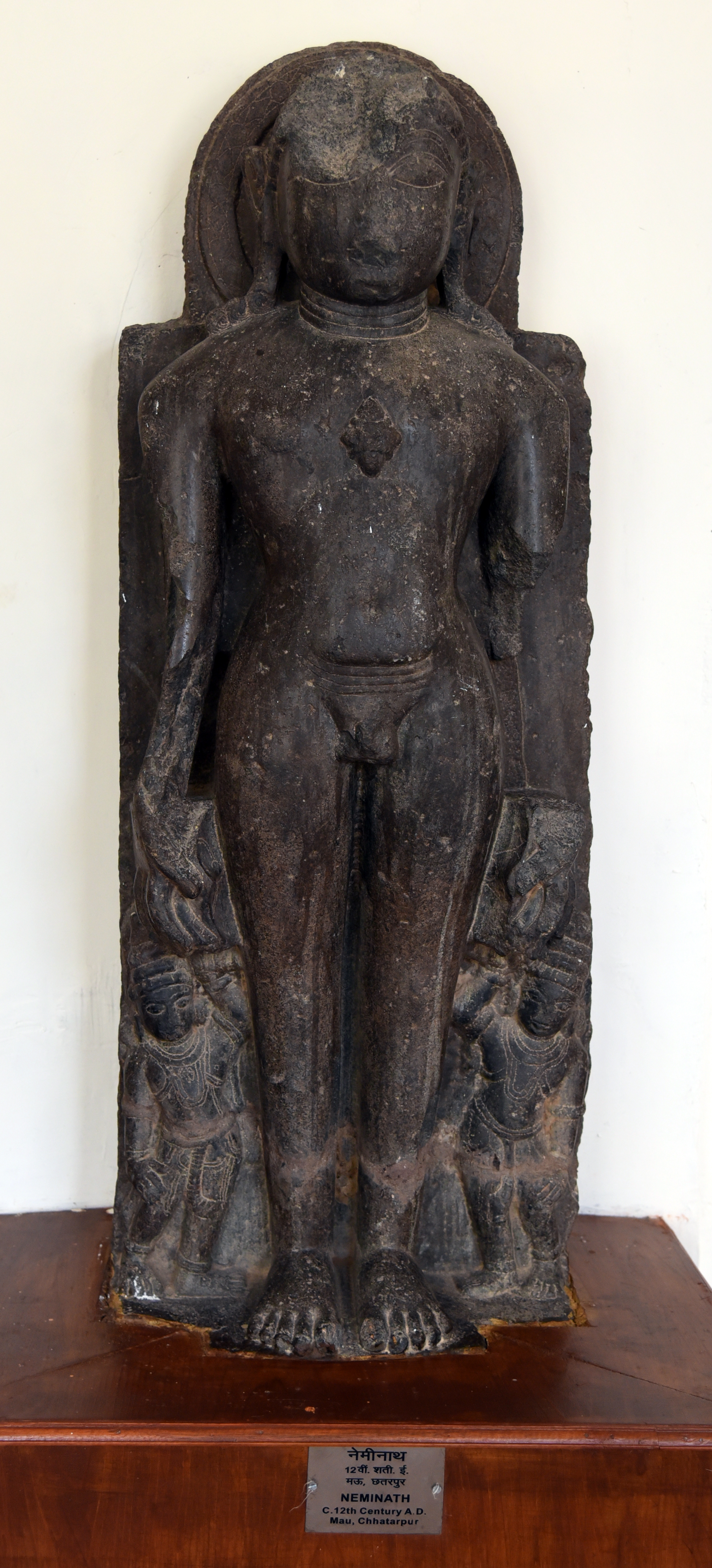
Image of Tīrthankara Neminath, 12th Century

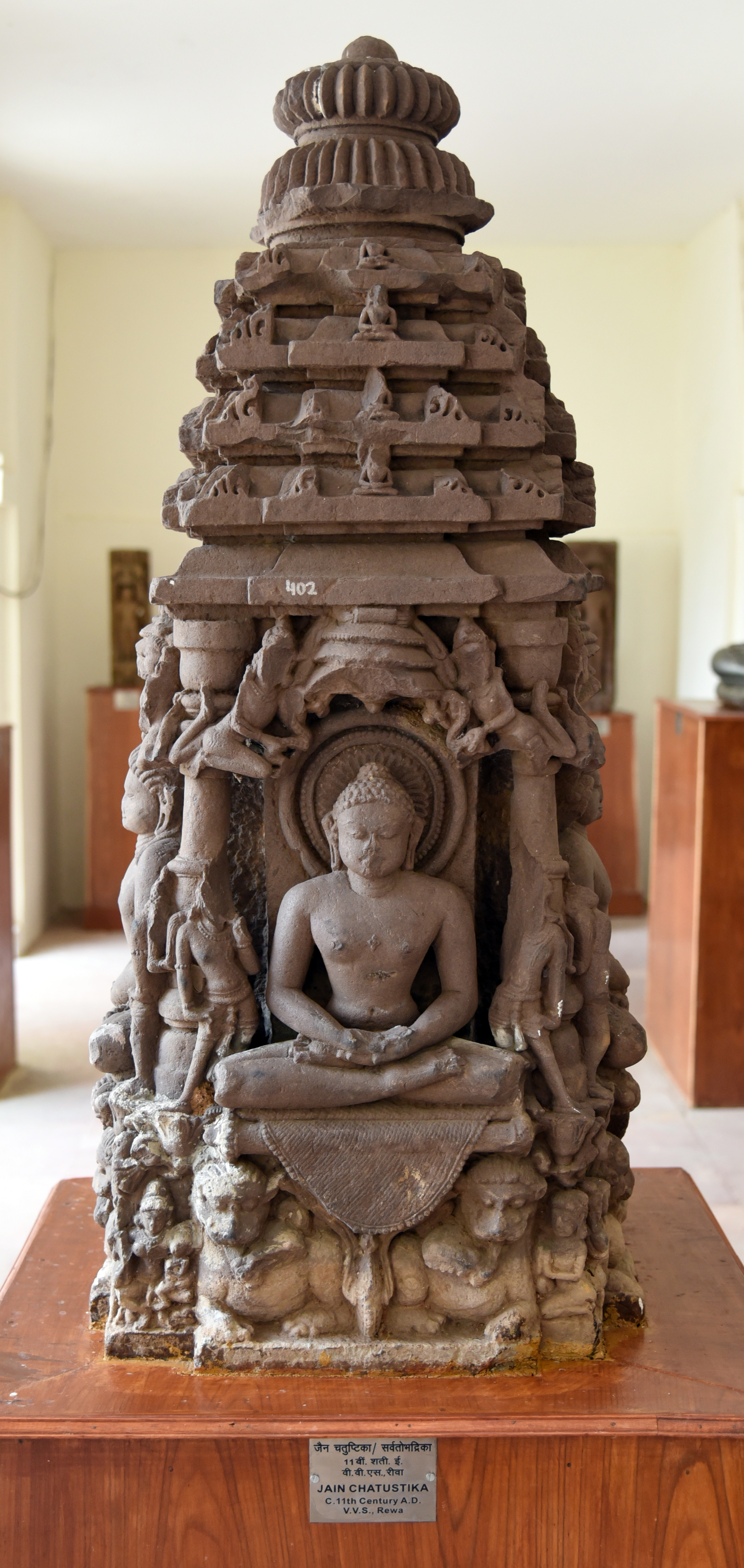
Jain Chatustika, 11th century

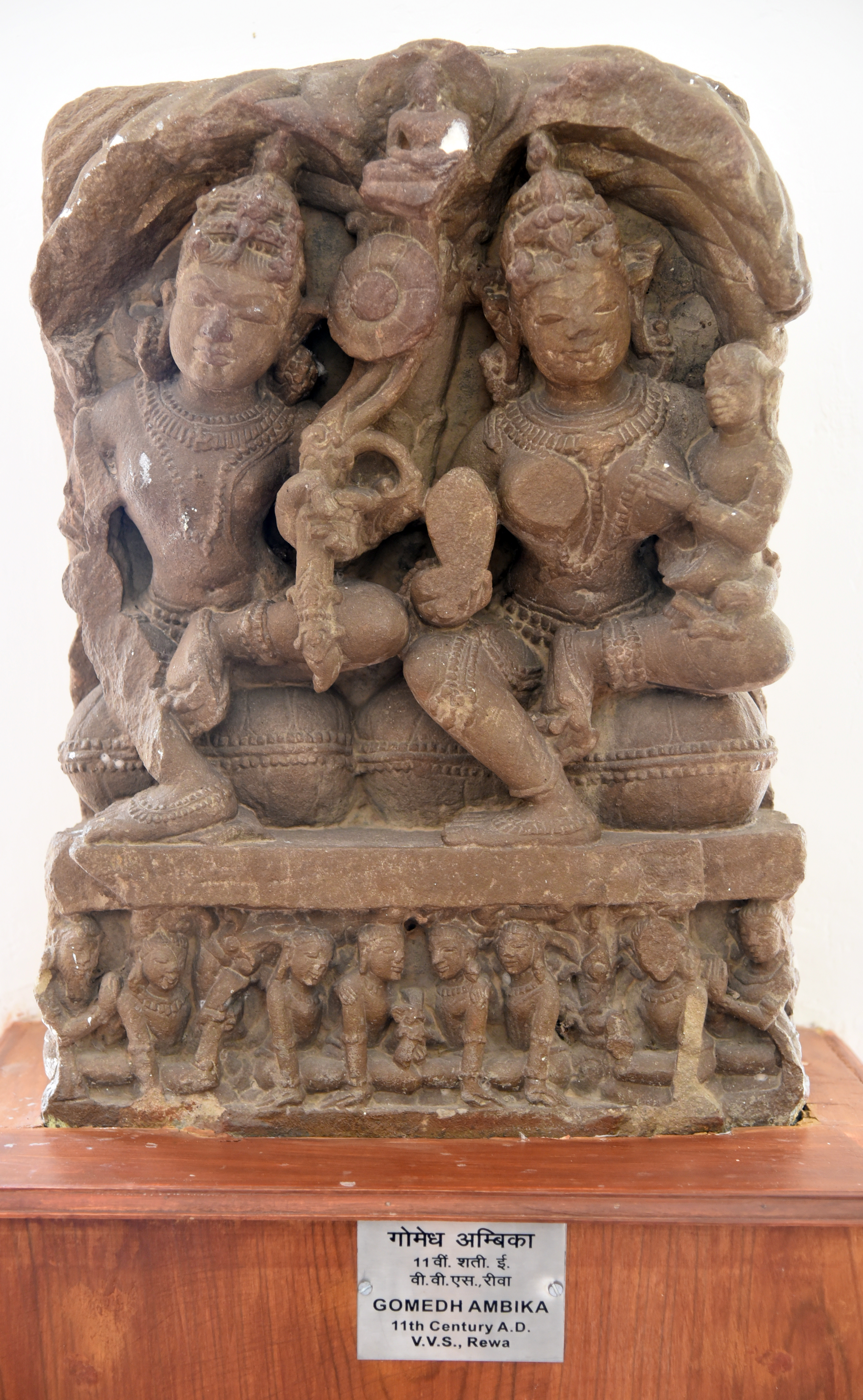
Sculpture of Gomedh and Ambika, 11th century

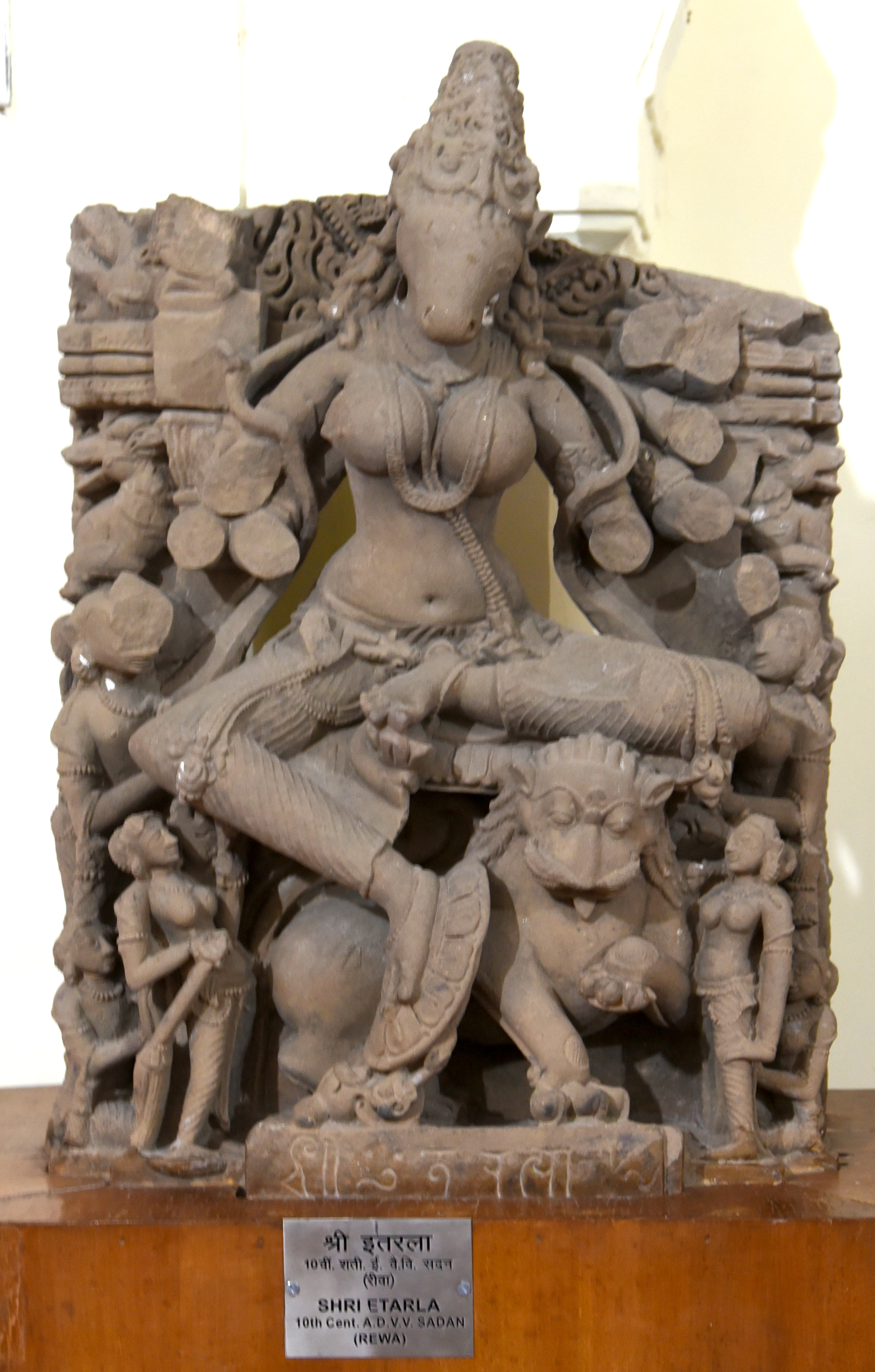
Shri Etarla, 10 Century AD

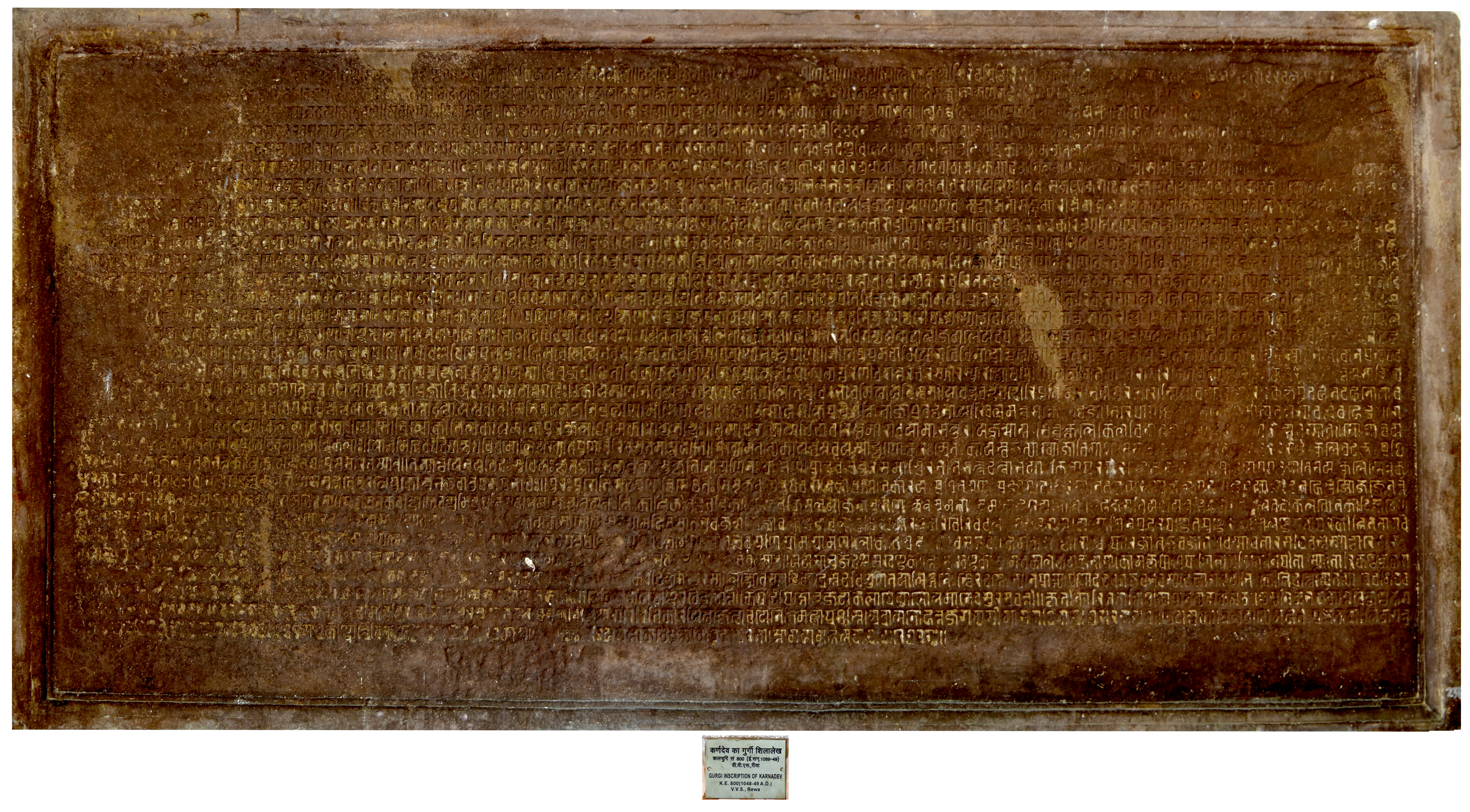
Gurgi Inscription of Karnadev, 11th century

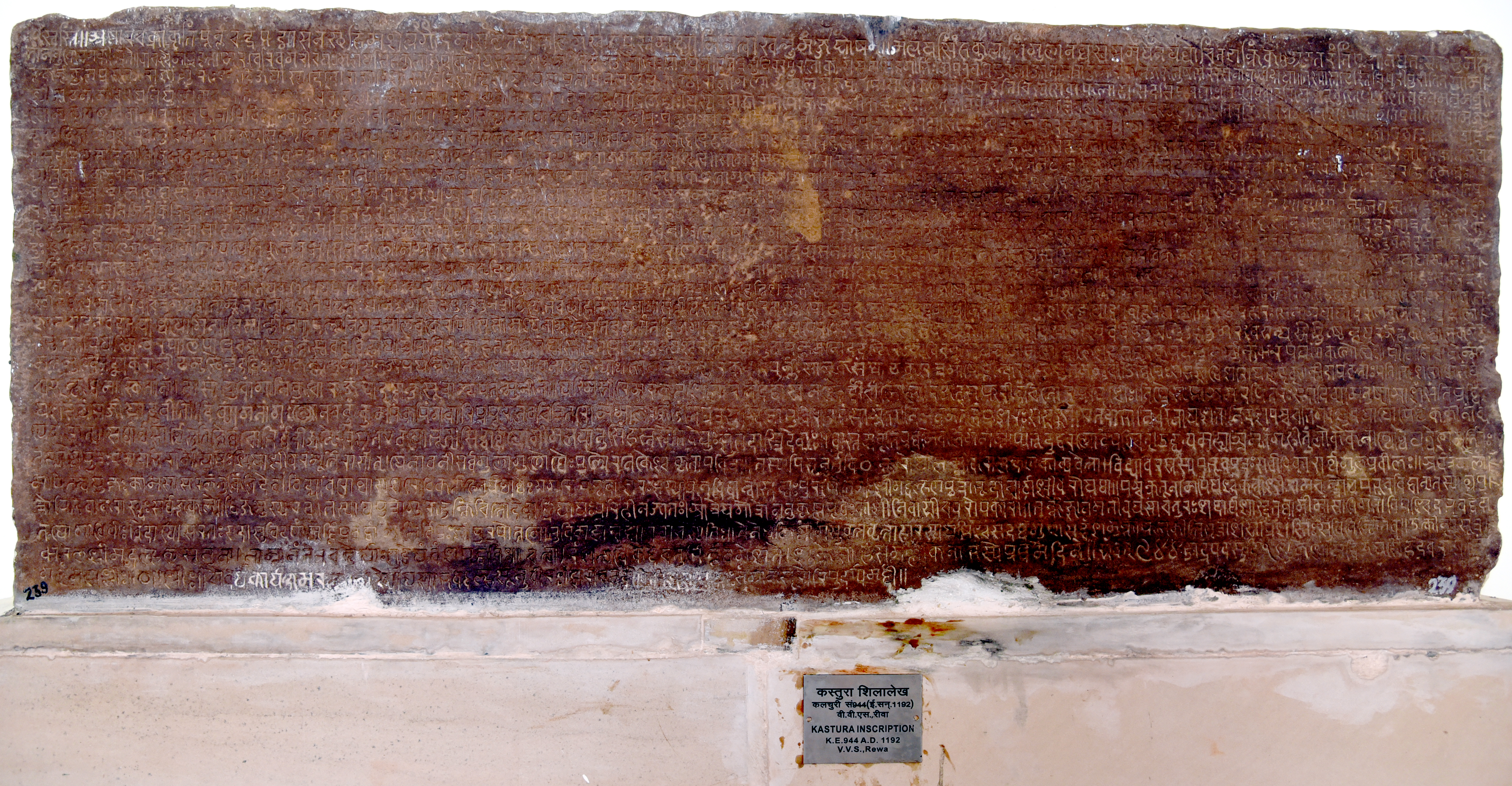
Kastura Inscription, 12th century

== History ==
Maharaja Chhatrasal (4 May 1649 - 19 December 1731), was a medieval Indian warrior who fought against the Mughal Emperor Aurangzeb, and established his own kingdom in Bundelkhand, becoming a Maharaja. Maharaja Chhatrasal Maqbara is one of those historical monuments of Chhatarpur that is actually the cenotaph of the Maharaja of Chhatrasal. It is also an important monument from an architectural point of view. This beautiful example of Bundeli architecture was built by Baji Rao Peshawa (First) in memory of Maharaja Chhatrasal in 1736 A. D.

=== Other Monuments in Dhubela ===
- Maharani Kamlapati Cenotaph. It is an octagonal structure situated on a high platform. Built in the 17th century the monument is a fine example of Bundeli style.
- Sheetal Garhi was built in the 17th century during the period of Maharaja Chhatrasal, this famous monument exemplifies the rich Bundeli art. This fortress was built for residential purpose to escape the excessive heat in the peak of summer. Its interior is decorated with foliage patterns.
- Mahoba Gate, built by Maharaja Chhatrasal in the 17th century the gate represents the rich Bundeli art. It was built to connect Mahoba and Mau Sahania. This huge entrance has two gates.
- Shri Krishna pranami mandir is near Maharaja Chhatrasal Cenotaph.
