= Chikhalthan =

Village in Maharashtra

- village
- Location in Maharashtra, India Chikhalthan (India)
- Coordinates: 20.194692°N 75.200841°E
- Country: India
- State: Maharashtra
- District: Aurangabad district

Government
  - Type: Gram Panchayat

Languages
  - Official: Marathi
- Time zone: UTC+5:30 (IST)
- PIN: 431103
- Vehicle registration: MH20

Chikhalthan is a village in the Kannad taluka of Aurangabad district in Maharashtra State, India.

== Demographics ==
Covering 2,961 hectares (7,320 acres) and comprising 1059 households at the time of the 2011 census of India, Chikhalthan had a population of 5041. There were 2628 males and 2413 females, with 672 people being aged six or younger.

== Economy ==
It is a part of Sugarcane belt comprising Pune, Ahmednagar and Solapur belt.

The backwater of Ujani Dam situated on Bhima River is the main source of irrigation. Other than sugarcane nowadays plantation crops like banana, pomegranate can also be seen here.

== See also ==
- List of villages in Rahuri taluka
- Baji Rao I
