= Chhatrasal =

Maharaja of Bundelkhand from 1675 to 1731

- Maharaja of Bundelkhand; Bundela Kesari (The Lion of Bundelkhand)
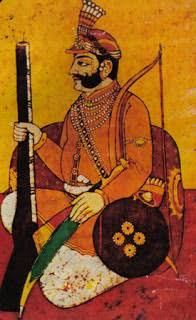
- Chhatrasal Bundela

Raja of Panna
- Reign: 1675 – 20 December 1731
- Predecessor: Post established
- Successor: Harde Sah (Panna State); Jagat Rai (Jaitpur State); Bharti Chand (Jaso State)
- Born: 4 May 1649; Erach zilla, Agra Subah, Mughal Empire
- Died: 20 December 1731 (aged 82), Maratha Empire
- Spouse: Dev Kunwari; Sushila Bai; Ruhani Bai Begum
- Issue: Harde Sah; Jagat Rai; Bharti Chand; Mastani
- House: Bundela
- Father: Champat Rai
- Mother: Sarandha
- Religion: Hinduism

Maharaja Chhatrasal Bundela (4 May 1649 – 20 December 1731) was the Bundela Maharaja of Panna or Maharaja of Bundelkhand from 1675 to 1731. He is well known for his resistance against the Mughal Empire and leading the struggle of independence of Bundelkhand.

== Early life ==
Chhatrasal was born at Kachar Kachnai in Tikamgarh, in a Bundela Rajput family on 4 May 1649, to Champat Rai and Sarandha. He was a descendant of Rudra Pratap Singh of Orchha.

== Bundela war of independence ==
Chhatrasal was 12 when his father Champat Rai of Mahoba was killed by the Mughals during the reign of Aurangzeb. Chhatrasal wanted to join Chhatrapati Shivaji Maharaj in Maharashtra who encouraged him to wage war of independence in Bundelkhand instead. Accordingly Chhatrasal raised the banner of revolt against the Mughals in Bundelkhand at the age of 22, with an army of 5 horsemen and 25 swordsmen, in 1671.

Chhatrasal declared independence from Mughals in the 1720s and was able to resist the Mughals until he was attacked by Muhammad Khan Bangash in December 1728. Chhatrasal was 79 years old when he led his army against Bangash, after a severe battle Chhatrasal was defeated and was forced to retreat to his fort at Jaitpur. The Mughals besieged him and conquered most of his territories. Chhatrasal made several attempts to ask Baji Rao I, the Peshwa of Maratha Empire, for help. However, the Peshwa was busy and could not help Chhatrasal until March 1729. In a letter sent to Baji rao, Chhatrasal wrote: "Know you Bajirao! That I am in the same plight in which the famous elephant was when caught by the crocodile. My valiant race is on the point of extinction. Come and save my honour". Peshwa Baji Rao I personally led his army towards Bundelkhand and attacked several Mughal outposts, the Mughal supplies were completely cut off by the swift cavalry of the Peshwa in the Battle of Malwa. Bangash, who was surprised by the sudden involvement of the Marathas, sent several letters to the Mughal emperor for aid, however upon being denied any help he started negotiations with Chhatrasal and Bajirao. Bangash was allowed to retreat on the condition that he never returns or shows aggression towards Bundelkhand. Chhatrasal rewarded the Peshwa with large tracts of lands and diamond mines in Bundelkhand which helped the Marathas to gain access to Central and North India. He also defeated Aurangzeb

== Relation with Bajirao I ==
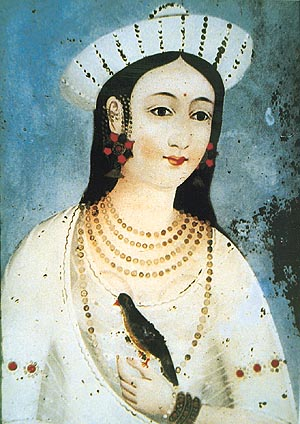
Mastani, the wife of the Peshwa Baji Rao I was Chhatrasal's daughter

Peshwa Baji Rao's second wife Mastani was Chhatrasal's daughter born from his concubine Ruhani Begum.

== Patron of literature ==
Chhatrasal was a patron of literature, and his court housed several noted poets. His eulogies written by Kavi Bhushan, Lal Kavi, Bakhshi Hansaraj and other court poets helped him gain lasting fame. He also contributed in construction of Jain temples of Kundalpur, an ancient Jain pilgrim site in Madhya Pradesh.

== Death and Succession ==
Chatrasal was able to carve out a big kingdom for himself. Before his death, he divided his kingdom into three parts. Bajirao was given one third of his territory worth 30 lakhs of revenue, Chatrasal's eldest son Harde Sah of Panna was given territory worth 38 lakhs of revenue and his second son, Jagat Raj of Banda, was given territory worth 30 lakhs. The younger sons were also given lands to support their lifestyle.

== Legacy ==
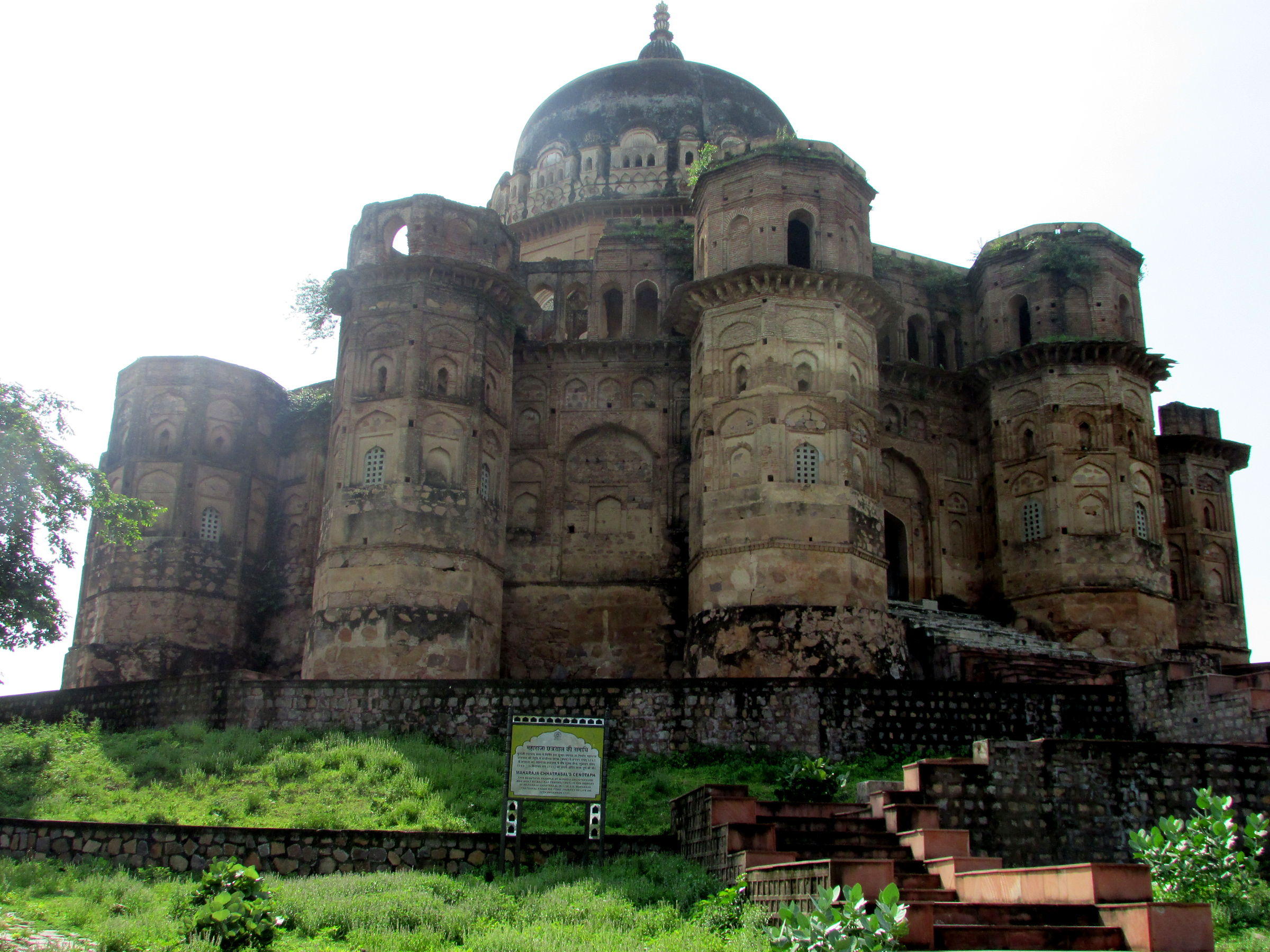
Chhatri of Maharaja Chhatrasal, at Dhubela (near Chhatarpur)

The Chhatarpur town and its eponymous district in Madhya Pradesh are named after Chhatrasal. Several places in Chhatarpur, including the Maharaja Chhatrasal Museum, Maharaja Chhatrasal Station Chhatarpur railway station (a railway station in Chhatarpur), are named after him. The Chhatrasal Stadium in Delhi and Chhatrasal Nagar (a colony) in Bhopal is also named after the Maharaja Chhatrasal.

== In popular culture ==
=== Films and television ===
- Veer Chhatrasal is a 1971 Indian historical film about the king by Harsukh Jagneshwar Bhatt, starring Ajit in the title role.
- The 2015 historical drama film Bajirao Mastani, directed by Sanjay Leela Bhansali, starred Benjamin Gilani as Maharaja Chhatrasal.
- The 2017 historical drama Peshwa Bajirao (TV series) starred Madan Joshi as Maharaja Chhatrasal.
- Chhatrasal, a 2021 web series released on MX Player starring Jitin Gulati in the title role of Maharaja Chhatrasal.
- Benjamin Gilani portrays a fictional version of Maharaja Chhatrasal in the 2015 film Bajirao Mastani directed by Sanjay Leela Bhansali, based on Nagnath S. Inamdar's novel Raau.
