= Peshwa Bajirao (TV series) =

- Genre: Historical period drama
- Created by: Nilanjana Purkayasstha
- Starring: See below
- Country of origin: India
- Original language: Hindi
- No. of seasons: 1
- No. of episodes: 151

Production
- Producers: Sunjoy Waddhwa; Nilanjana Purkayasstha
- Production locations: Mumbai, India
- Camera setup: Multi-camera
- Running time: 22 minutes approx.
- Production company: Sphere Origins

Original release
- Network: Sony Entertainment Television
- Release: January 23 – August 25, 2017

Peshwa Bajirao is an Indian Hindi historical drama television series, which broadcast from 23 January 2017 to 25 August 2017 on Sony TV. The series is based on a Peshwa of the Maratha Empire, Bajirao I, who ruled under the Chhatrapati known as Shahu. The series was produced by Sphere Origins of Sunjoy Waddhwa and creatively produced by Nilanjana Purkayasstha's company Invictus T Mediaworks. The series was aired on weekdays.

== Plot ==
The series chronicles the journey of Bajirao in becoming a Peshwa and a great Maratha warrior battling the Mughal Empire under the tutelage of his mother, father and the noble teacher Brahmanendra Swami and would also touch his arrange marriage with Kashibai and with Mastani.

== Cast ==
- Aditya Shrivastav as Narrator for first episode
- Karan Suchak as Bajirao I
- Rudra Soni as young Bajirao I
- Ishita Ganguly as Kashibai
- Manish Wadhwa as Balaji Vishwanath
- Megha Chakraborty as Mastani
- Saurabh Ghokhale as Chimaji Appa
- Anuja Sathe/ Rajeshwari Sachdev as Radhabai
- Rahul Singh as Aurangzeb
- Manish Khanna as Bahadur Shah I
- Sameer Dharmadhikari as Chhatrapati Shahu
- Pallavi Joshi as Tarabai
- Ravindra Mankani as Brahmanendra Swami
- Yuri Suri as Qamar-ud-din Khan, Asif Jah I
- Deepshikha Nagpal as Zeenat-un-Nissa
- Vishal Jethwa as Nasir Jung
- Sanjay Batra as Dhanaji Jadhav
- Amit Behl as Shripatrao Pant Pratinidhi
- Chetan Hansraj as Muhammad Azam Shah
- Neetha Shetty as Savitribai Bhosle
- Pankaj Berry as Krishnaji Bhatt
- Shailesh Datar as Mahadji Krishna Joshi, Kashibai's father
- Preeti Puri as Shiu Krishna Joshi, Kashibai's mother
- Kapil Arya as Chandrasen Jadhav
- Dolly Sohi as Ruhanabai, Mastani's mother
- Dinesh Mehta as Jagat Raj
- Madan Joshi as Raja Chhatrasal
- Ekroop Bedi as Bhiubai Ghorpade
- Rushiraj Pawar as Young Malhar Rao Holkar
- Nitin Prabhat as young Chhatrapati Shahu
- Sumit Kaul as Muhammad Kam Bakhsh
- Ayaan Zubair Rahmani as Chimaji
- Syed Aman Mian Sharma as Ballu Phadke
- Pravisht Mishra as Young Shivaji II
- Vishnu Sharma as Bappaji Rao Ketkar

=== Guest appearances ===
- Aditya Redij as Shivaji
  - Siddharth Nigam as younger Shivaji
- Ishant Bhanushali as Vishesh
- Pawan Chopra as Rajaram Chhatrapati
- Roma Bali as Rajasbai
