= Mastani =

Second wife of Bajirao I (1699-1740)

- Maharani; Princess of Bundelkhand
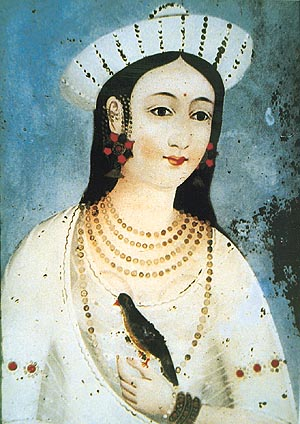
- A portrait of Mastani (dated 18th century)
- Born: 29 August 1699; Mausahaniya, Agra Subah, Mughal Empire (modern-day Chhatarpur district, Madhya Pradesh, India)
- Died: 28 May 1740 (aged 40); Pabal, Pune, Maratha Empire (modern-day Maharashtra, India)
- Burial: Pabal, Maharashtra, India
- Spouse: Bajirao I (m. 1729)
- Issue: Shamsher Bahadur I
- House: Bundela (by birth); Bhat (by marriage)
- Father: Chhatrasal
- Mother: Ruhani Bai Begum
- Religion: Sunni Islam

Mastani (29 August 1699 – 28 April 1740) was the daughter of Maharaja Chhatrasal Bundela of Bundelkhand. She was the second wife of the Maratha Peshwa (Prime Minister) Baji Rao I. The marriage was arranged to promote diplomatic ties with the Maratha Empire. Her relationship within the Maratha Brahmin family has been subject of both admiration and controversy and well adapted in Indian novels and cinema.

== Biography ==
=== Early life ===
Mastani was born to Chhatrasal, and his Persian concubine Ruhani Begum. Her father was the founder of the Panna State. She and her father were followers of the Pranami Sampradaya, a Hindu sect based on the Bhakti worship of Sri Krishna, but as her mother was Sunni, she was also a follower of Sunni Islam.

Accounts, however with regard to her origin vary. Some consider her the daughter of the Nizam, while others refer to her as a courtesan of the court of some Muslim chief. The Nizam on suggestion of his wife married her to Bajirao to promote diplomatic relations with Marathas.

=== Marriage with Bajirao I ===
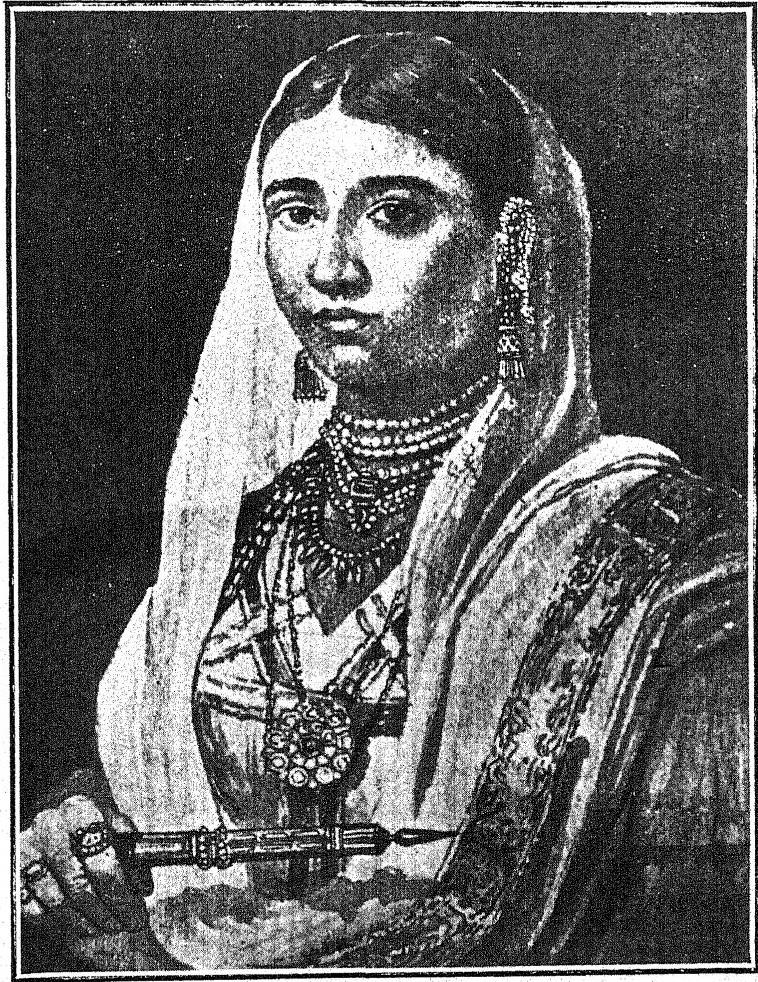
"Mastani bai" as depicted in A history of the Maratha People

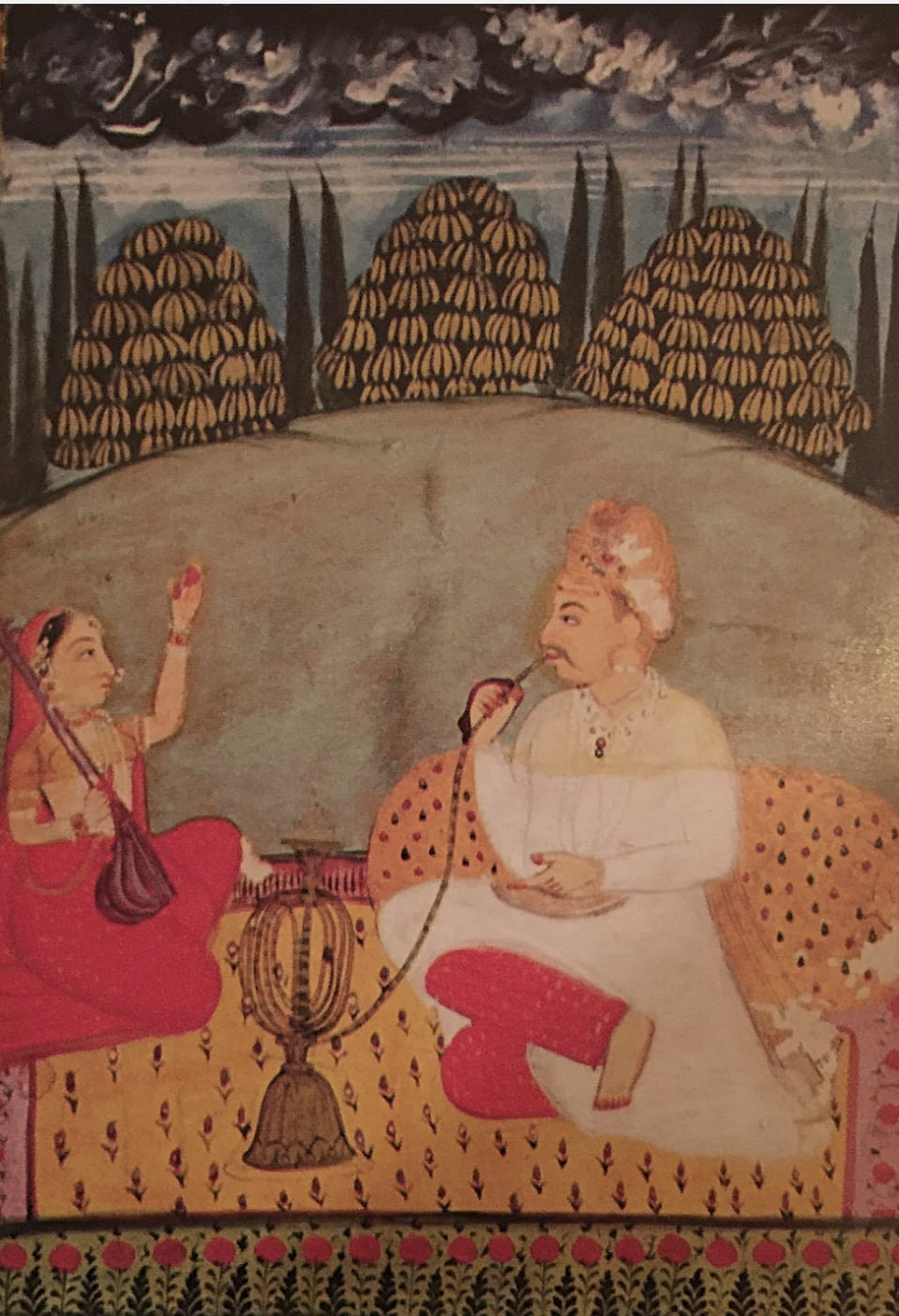
Painting of Bajirao and Mastani

In 1728, Nawab Muhammad Khan Bangash invaded Chhatrasal's kingdom, defeated him and besieged his capital. Chhatrasal secretly wrote to Bajirao requesting his help. But being occupied in a military campaign in Malwa Bajirao did not respond until 1729 when he marched on towards Bundelkhand. Ultimately Bajirao defeated Bangash after reaching Jaitpur near Kulpahar in present Uttar Pradesh.

In gratitude, Chhatrasal gave Bajirao the hand of his daughter Mastani, dominion over Jhansi, Sagar and Kalpi - amounting to a third of his kingdom. After his marriage to Mastani, he also gifted Bajirao with 33 lakh gold coins and a gold mine. At the time, Bajirao was already married. He, however, accepted out of regard for Chhatrasal.

Back in Pune, the marriage was not generally accepted because of the tradition of monogamy. Mastani lived for some time with Bajirao at his palace of Shaniwar Wada in the city of Pune. The palace's north-east corner held Mastani Mahal and had its own external doorway called Mastani Darwaza. Bajirao later built a separate residence for Mastani at Kothrud in 1734, some distance away from Shaniwar Wada. The site still exists at the Mrutyunjay temple on Karve road. The palace at Kothrud was dismantled and parts of this are displayed at a special section of Raja Dinkar Kelkar Museum.

=== Shamsher Bahadur ===
Mastani bore a son who was named Krishna Rao at birth, within a few months of Bajirao's first wife Kashibai delivering a son. The boy was eventually named Shamsher Bahadur I.

After the closely following deaths of Bajirao and Mastani in 1740, Kashibai took the 6 year-old Shamsher Bahadur under her care and raised him as one of her own. Shamsher was bestowed upon a portion of his father’s dominion of Banda and Kalpi. In 1761, he and his army contingent fought alongside the Peshwa in the Third Battle of Panipat between the Marathas and Afghans. He was wounded in that battle and died a few days later at Deeg.

=== Death ===
Mastani died in 1740,on 28 April shortly after Bajirao's death. Her cause of death is unknown. According to some, she died of a shock after perceiving her husband's death. But, many believe that she committed suicide after she heard of Bajirao's death by consuming poison. Mastani was buried in the village of Pabal. Her grave is called both Mastani's samadhi and Mastani's mazar.

== Descendants ==
Shamsher Bahadur's son Ali Bahadur I was given the Rajputana provinces that came in Mastani's dowry - Jhansi, Sagar and Kalpi. During the Indian Rebellion of 1857 his son Nawab Ali Bahadur II responded to a rakhi from Rani Laxmibai of Jhansi and fought against the British. Ali Bahadur (Krishna Singh) established his authority over large parts of Bundelkhand and became the Nawab of Banda. The descendant of Shamsher Bahadur continued their allegiance to baihi bai fought the English in the Anglo-Maratha War of 1803. His descendants were known as Nawabs of Banda. But after the defeat of Ali Bahadur, the British abolished the Banda state.

== In popular culture ==
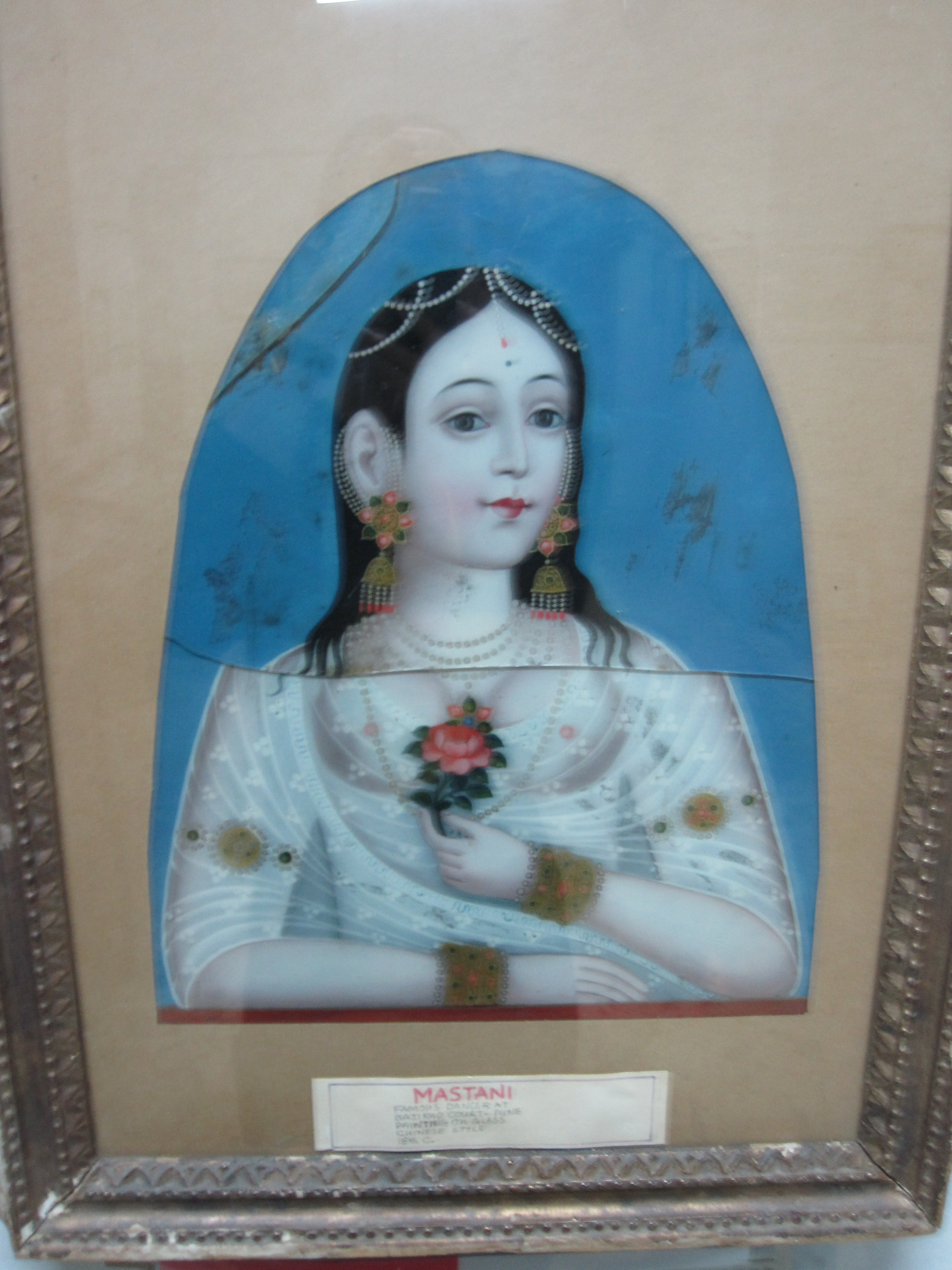
A painting depicting Mastani at display in Aina Mahal in Bhuj.

=== Literature ===
- 1972 - Rau, the Marathi novel by Nagnath S. Inamdar featuring a fictionalized love story between Baji Rao I and Mastani.

=== Films ===
- 1925 – the silent film Bajirao Mastani, co-directed by Bhalji Pendharkar and Nanubhai Desai, starred Miss Jones as Mastani
- 1955 - Mastana directed by Dhirubhai Desai. It starred Nigar Sultana, Manher Desai, Shahu Modak and Agha.
- 2015 - Bajirao Mastani directed by Sanjay Leela Bhansali based on the fictional Marathi novel Rau. Deepika Padukone portrayed the character.

=== Television ===
- 1990 - Rau a Marathi TV series based on the fictional novel Rau.
- 2015 - Shrimant Peshwa Bajirao Mastani, a Marathi TV serial broadcast on ETV Marathi.
- 2017 - Peshwa Bajirao, a Hindi TV series premiered and broadcast on Sony TV India. Mastani was played by Megha Chakraborty.
