= Bajirao I =

Peshwa of the Maratha Empire from 1720 to 1740

Shrimant Peshwa Bajirao I
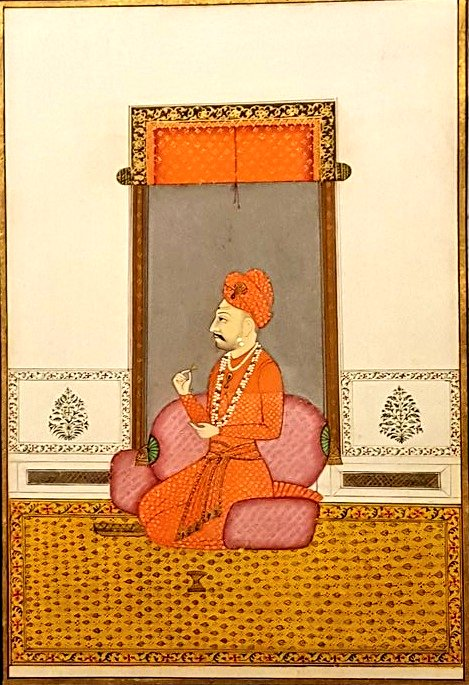
- Portrait of Bajirao I, 18th-19th century

7th Peshwa of the Maratha Empire
- In office 17 April 1720 – 28 April 1740
- Monarch: Shahu I
- Preceded by: Balaji Vishwanath
- Succeeded by: Balaji Bajirao

Personal details
- Born: Bajirao Balal; 18 August 1700 Dubere, Sinnar, Nashik District
- Died: 28 April 1740 (aged 39) Rawerkhedi, Maratha Empire
- Spouses: Kashibai (m. 1720); Mastani (m. 1728)
- Children: 5, including Balaji Baji Rao, Shamsher Bahadur and Raghunath Rao
- Parents: Balaji Vishwanath (father); Radhabai Barve (mother)
- Relatives: Chimaji Appa (brother); Bhiubai Joshi (sister); Anubai Ghorpade (sister); Sadashiv Rao (nephew)
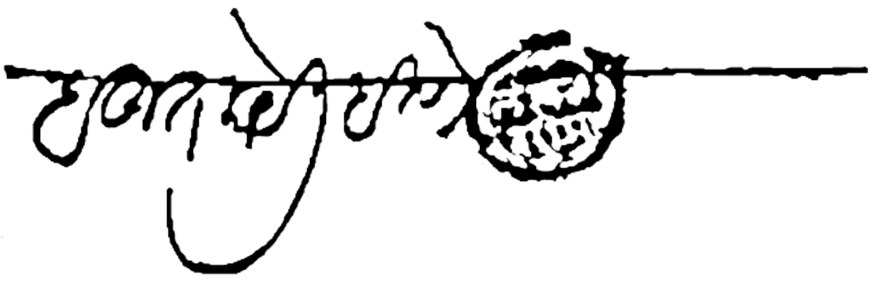
- Signature
- Military career
- Branch: Maratha Army
- Rank: Peshwa
- Unit: Peshwa's Cavalry
- Conflicts: See list: Delhi (1719); Shakar Kheda (1724); Carnatic (1725–26); Carnatic (1726–27); Bundelkhand (1729); Malwa (1730); Luso–Maratha War (1729–1732); Dabhoi (1731); Konkan (1733); Delhi (1737); Talkatora (1737); Firozabad (1737); Siege of Attri (1737); Itmadpur (1737); Bhopal (1737); Deccan (1739); Bundi (1739)

Bajirao I (born Visaji, Marathi: [ˈbaːdʑiɾaːʋ bəˈlːaːɭ̆]; 18 August 1700 – 28 April 1740) was the 7th Peshwa of the Maratha Empire.

Born in a Brahmin family as the son of Peshwa Balaji Vishwanath, he began his military career at a young age. After the death of Balaji, he was proclaimed Peshwa and over the new two decades he led the Maratha army on an unprecedented campaign of expansion, conquering Mughal territory up till Delhi and Cuttack. He further solidified Maratha authority in the Deccan by defeating the Nizam of Hyderabad at Palkhed and liberated several kingdoms and vassals from Mughal influence. Among them was the Bundela ruler Chhatrasal, whom Bajirao rescued from a Mughal siege, gaining independence for Bundelkhand. Subsequently, Chhatrasal granted Bajirao a jagir and his daughter Mastani's hand in marriage. Bajirao asserted Maratha tax rights in Gujarat, defeating rebel Trimbak Rao Dabhade in 1731 at Dabhoi; he also engaged in a diplomatic mission to persuade Rajput courts for chauth payments. Further efforts to establish Maratha dominance saw him responsible for the Battle of Delhi (1737) which may be said to mark the pinnacle of his military career. He secured the important territory of Malwa after defeating the combined forces of Mughal-Nizam-Nawab of Awadh in Battle of Bhopal (1737). At the time of his death in 1740, the Maratha Empire had reached its greatest territorial extent yet and was amongst the largest powers of the subcontinent.

Bajirao's adventurous life has been picturized in Indian cinema and also featured in novels. Bajirao had two wives: Kashibai and Mastani. Bajirao's relationship with his second wife Mastani is a controversial subject; very little is known with certainty about it. She was generally referenced cryptically in books, letters or documents from that era.

== Early life ==
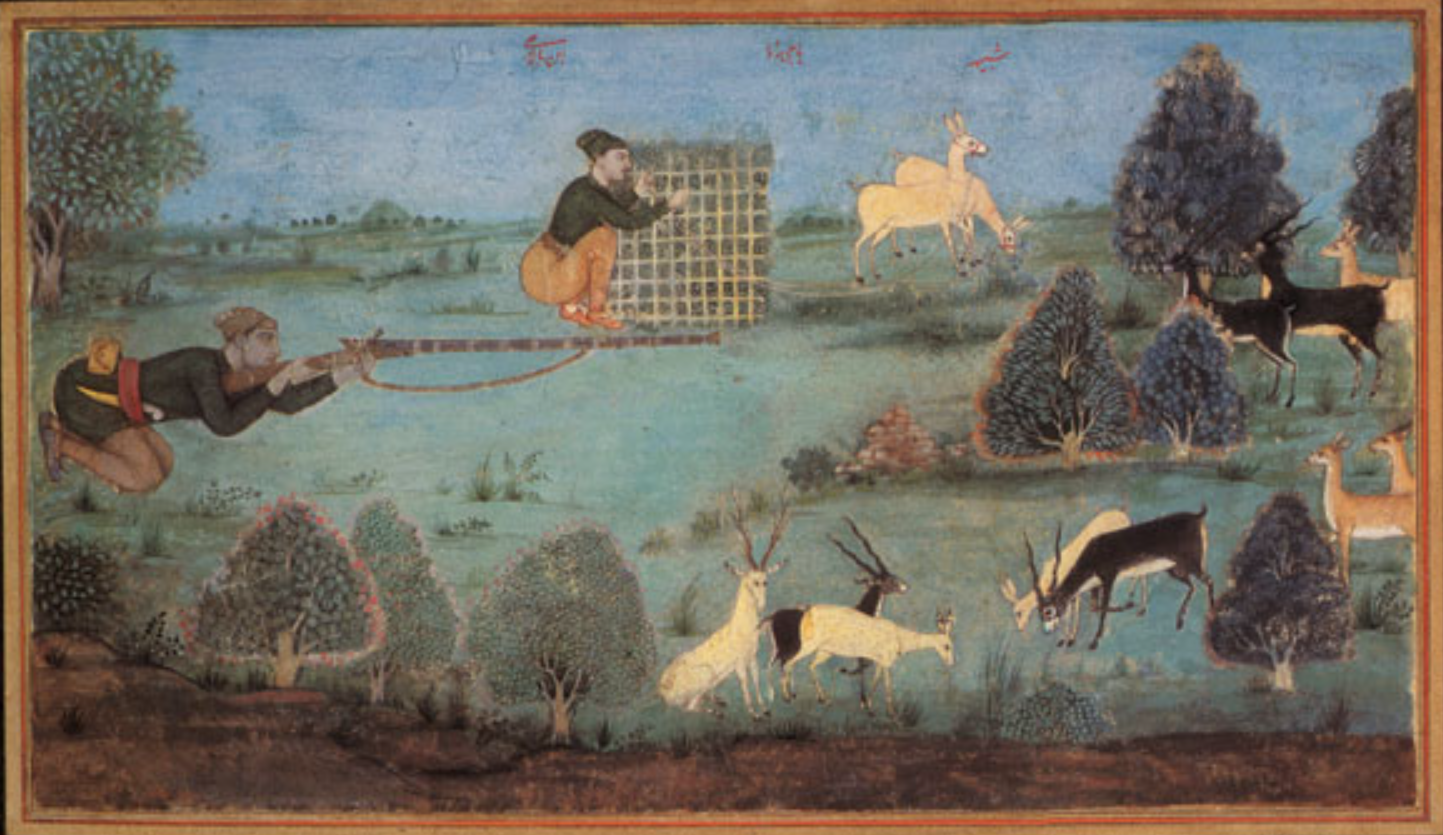
Bajirao hunting with his father Balaji Vishwanath.

Bajirao was born into the Bhat family in Sinnar, near Nashik. His father Balaji Vishwanath was the Peshwa of Shahu I and his mother was Radhabai Barve. Bajirao had a younger brother, Chimaji Appa, and two younger sisters, Anubai and Bhiubai. Anubai was married to Venkatrao Ghorpade (Joshi) of Ichalkaranji and Bhiubai was married to Abaji Naik Joshi of Baramati.

Being born in a Brahmin family, his education included reading, writing and learning Sanskrit however, he did not remain confined to his books. Bajirao displayed a passion for the military at an early age and often accompanied his father on military campaigns. He was with his father when his father was imprisoned by Damaji Thorat before being released for a ransom. Bajirao had been on the expedition to Delhi in 1719 with his father and was convinced the Mughal Empire was disintegrating and would be unable to resist northward Maratha expansion. When Balaji Vishwanath died in 1720, Shahu appointed the 20-year-old Bajirao as Peshwa despite opposition from other chieftains.

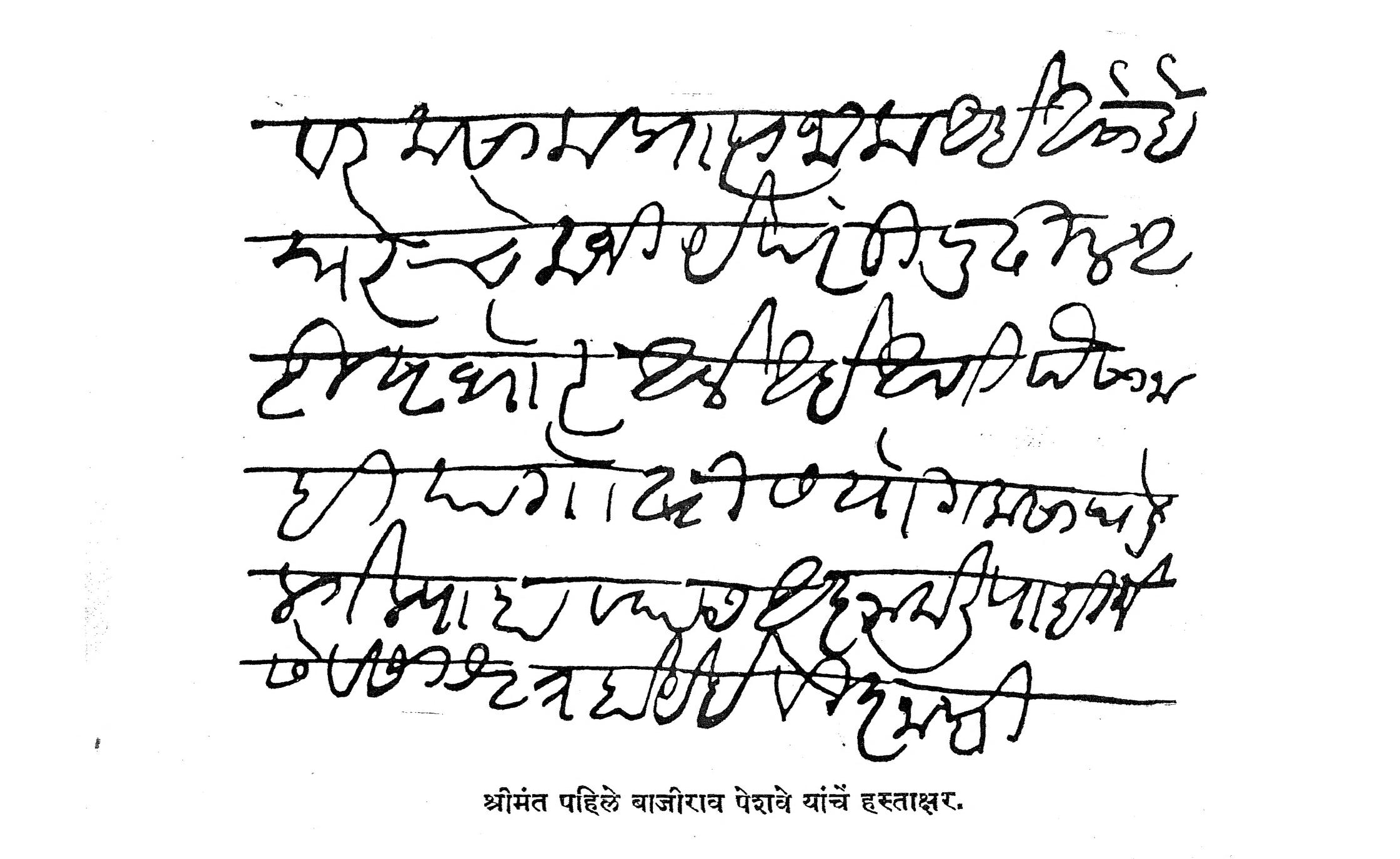
Bajirao I's handwriting in Modi script.

== Military campaigns and wars ==
Maratha expansion under Bajirao per Joseph E. Schwartzberg

By the time of his appointment, the Mughal emperor Muhammad Shah had upheld Maratha claims to the territories held by Shivaji at his death. A treaty gave the Marathas the right to collect taxes (chauth) in the Deccan's six provinces. Bajirao convinced Shahu that the Maratha Empire had to go on the offensive against its enemies to defend itself. He believed the Mughal Empire was in decline, and wanted to take advantage of the situation with aggressive expansion into North India. Bajirao compared the Mughals' declining fortune to a tree which, if attacked at its roots, would collapse. He is reported to have said:

Let us strike at the trunk of the withering tree and the branches will fall off themselves. Listen but to my counsel and I shall plant the Maratha flag on the walls of Attock.

As a new Peshwa, however, he faced several challenges. Bajirao promoted young men like himself, such as Malhar Rao Holkar, Ranoji Shinde, the Pawar brothers and Fateh Singh Bhosle, as commanders; these men did not belong to families who were hereditary Deshmukhs in the Deccan sultanates.

The Mughal viceroy of the Deccan, Asaf Jah I, Nizam of Hyderabad, had created a de facto autonomous kingdom in the region. He challenged Shahu 's right to collect taxes on the pretext that he did not know whether Shahu or his cousin, Sambhaji II of Kolhapur, was the rightful heir to the Maratha throne. The Marathas needed to assert their rights over the nobles of newly acquired territories in Malwa and Gujarat. Several nominally-Maratha areas were not actually under the Peshwa's control; for example, the Siddis controlled the Janjira fort.

=== The Nizam ===
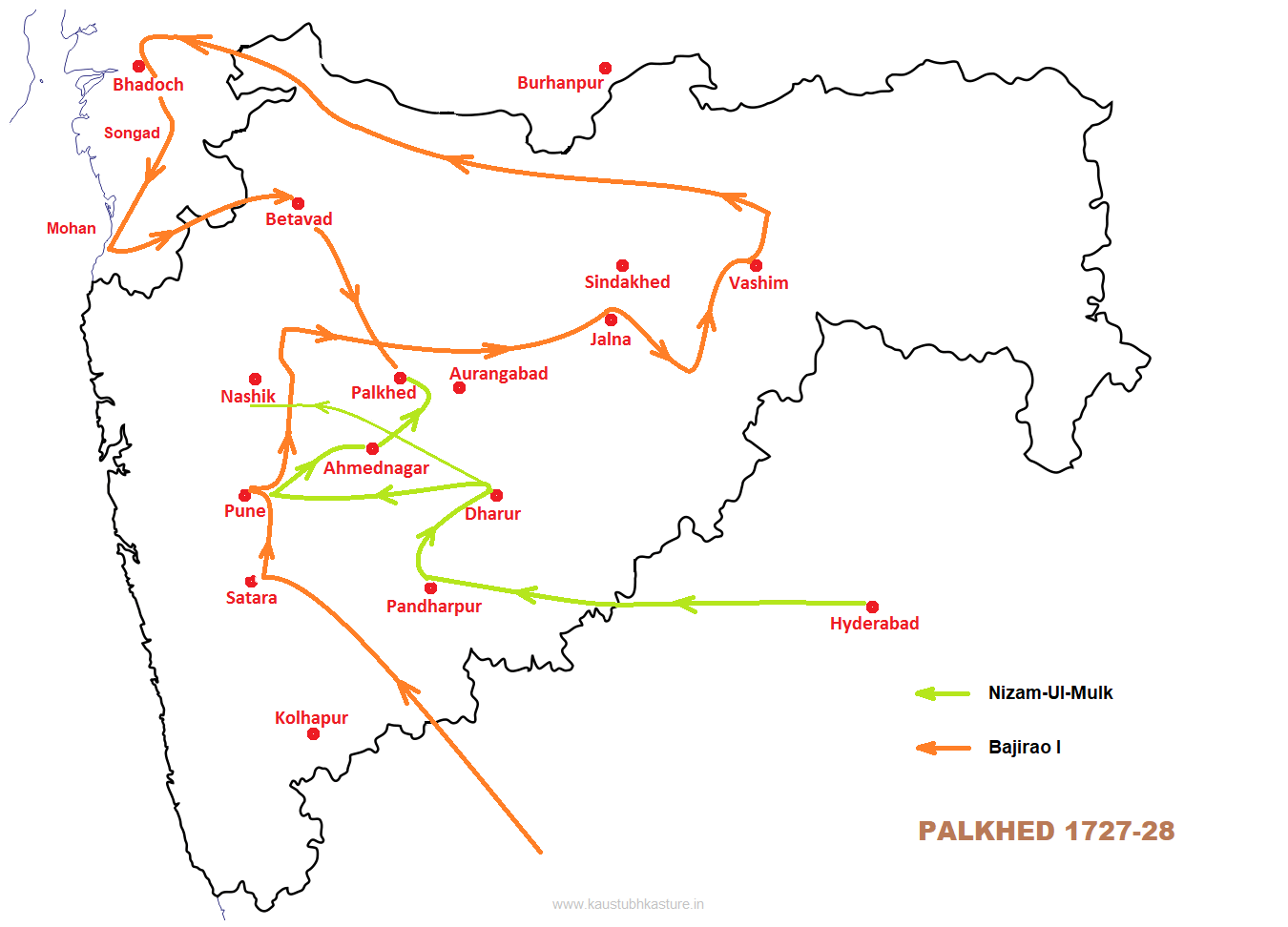
Troop movements of Bajirao I and Asaf Jah I (Nizam-ul-Mulk) in the Battle of Palkhed

At the outset of Bajirao's Peshwa rule, the Mughal leaders, led by Nizam-ul-Mulk, rebelled against the Sayyid Brothers. To quell the uprising, the Sayyid brothers sought assistance from the Marathas. However, in the Battle of Balapur, where Bajirao, Malhar Rao Holkar, and Khanderao Dabhade were present, the combined forces of the Sayyid Brothers and the Marathas were defeated by the Nizam's forces. Sankarji Malhar was captured as a prisoner of war, marking Bajirao's first significant military engagement as Peshwa.

On 4 January 1721, Bajirao met Nizam of Hyderabad at Chikhalthana to resolve their disputes. However, the Nizam refused to recognize the Maratha right to collect taxes from the Deccan provinces. He was made vizier of the Mughal Empire in 1721 by emperor Muhammad Shah, who, alarmed at his increasing power, transferred him from the Deccan to Awadh in 1723. The Nizam rebelled against the order, resigned as vizier and marched towards the Deccan. The emperor sent an army against him, which the Nizam defeated at the Battle of Sakhar-kheda; this forced the emperor to recognise him as viceroy of the Deccan. The Marathas, led by Bajirao, helped the Nizam win this battle. For his valor, Bajirao was honored with a robe, a 7,000-man mansabdari, an elephant, and a jewel. After the battle, the Nizam tried to appease the Maratha Chhatrapati Shahu and the Mughal emperor; in reality, however, he wanted to carve out a sovereign kingdom and considered the Marathas his rivals in the Deccan.

In 1725, the Nizam sent an army to clear Maratha revenue collectors from the Carnatic region. The Marathas dispatched a force under Fateh Singh Bhosle to counter him; Bajirao accompanied Bhosle, but according to Stewart Gordon, Bajirao did not command the army. According to Govind Sakharam Sardesai, Bajirao personally led the campaign under Shahu's command. In contrast, Stewart Gordon's account suggests that Bajirao was present during the campaign but did not assume command.

In the Deccan, Sambhaji II of Kolhapur State had become a rival claimant to the title of Maratha King. The Nizam took advantage of the internal dispute, refusing to pay the chauth because it was unclear who was the real Chhatrapati (Shahu or Sambhaji II) and offering to arbitrate. Shripatrao Pant Pratinidhi advised Shahu to begin negotiations and agree to arbitration. Sambhaji II was supported by Chandrasen Jadhav, who had fought Bajirao's father a decade earlier. Bajirao convinced Shahu to refuse the Nizam's offer and instead launch an assault.

The Nizam invaded Pune, where he installed Sambhaji II as the King. He then marched out of the city, leaving behind a contingent headed by Fazal Beg. The Nizam plundered Loni, Pargaon, Patas, Supa and Baramati, using his artillery. On 27 August 1727, Bajirao began a retaliatory guerilla attack on the Nizam with his trusted lieutenants Malhar Rao Holkar, Ranoji Shinde and the Pawar brothers. He began to destroy the towns held by the Nizam; leaving Pune, he crossed the Godavari River near Puntamba and plundered Jalna and Sindkhed. Bajirao destroyed Berar, Mahur, Mangrulpir and Washim before turning north-west to Khandesh. He crossed the Tapi River at Kokarmunda and entered eastern Gujarat, reaching Chota Udaipur in January 1728. After hearing that the Nizam had returned to Pune, Bajirao feinted toward Burhanpur; he thought that after hearing about the threat to the strategically important Burhanpur, the Nizam would try to save it. Bajirao did not enter Burhanpur, however, arriving at Betawad in Khandesh on 14 February 1728. When the Nizam heard that his northern territories had been devastated by Bajirao, he left Pune and marched towards the Godavari to meet Bajirao on an open plain where his artillery would be effective. The Nizam went on ahead of his artillery; on 25 February 1728, the armies of Bajirao and the Nizam faced each other at Palkhed, a town about 30 miles (48 km) west of Aurangabad. The Nizam was quickly surrounded by Maratha forces and trapped, his lines of supply and communication were cut. He was forced to make peace; he signed the Treaty of Mungi Shevgaon on 6 March, recognising Shahu as the king and recognising the Maratha right to collect taxes in the Deccan.

This event is considered as an example of brilliant execution of military strategy. In his Military History of India, Jadunath Sarkar wrote: "This campaign gives a classic example of what the predatory horse, when led by a genius, could achieve in the age of light artillery."

Bajirao moved his base of operations from Saswad to Pune in 1728, laying the foundation for the transformation of the kasba into a large city. He began the construction of Shaniwar Wada on 10 January 1730.

=== Bundelkhand ===
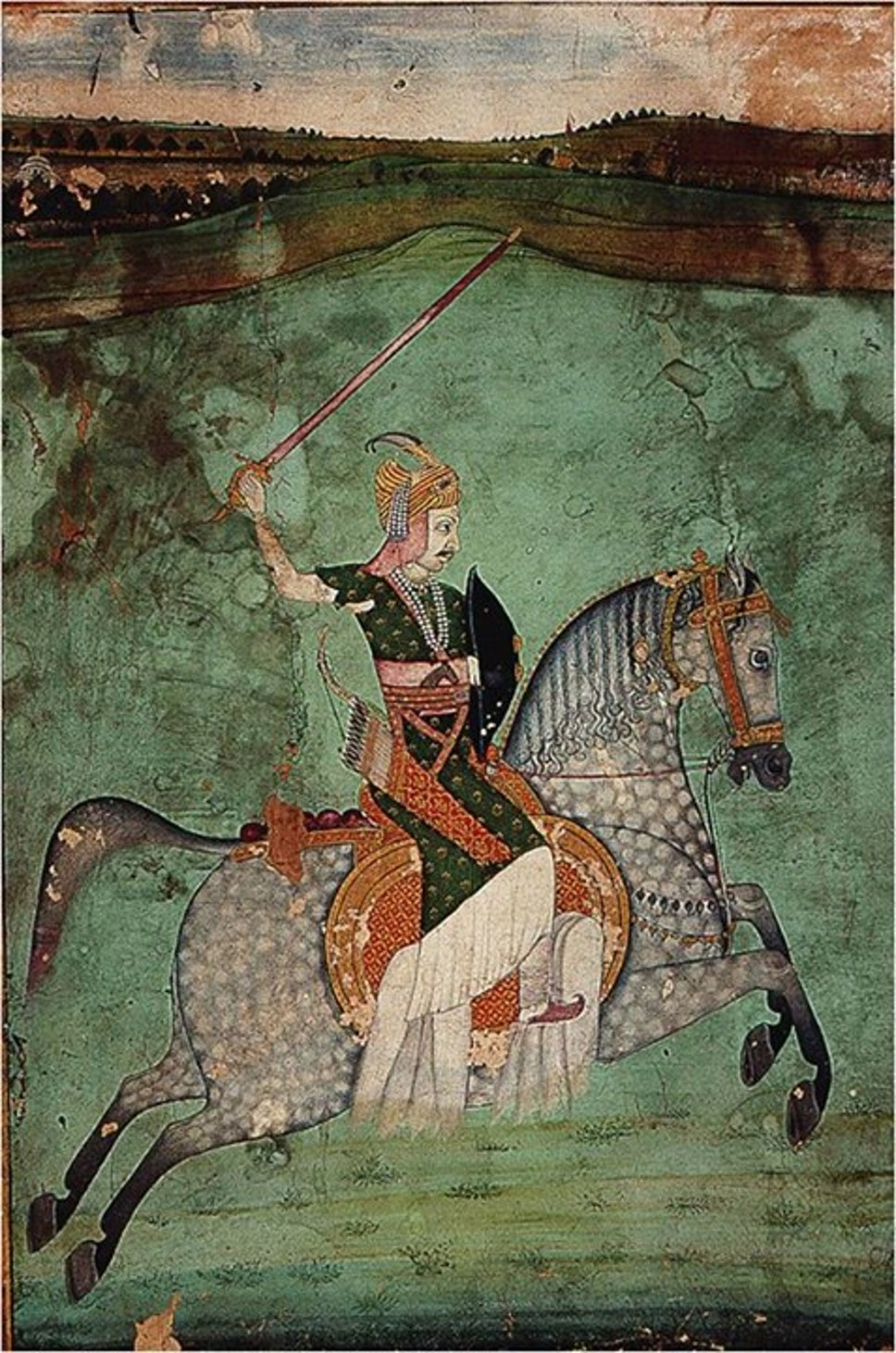
Bajirao I riding a horse into battle c.1720–1740

In Bundelkhand, Chhatrasal rebelled against the Mughal Empire and established an independent kingdom. In December 1728, a Mughal force led by Muhammad Khan Bangash attacked him and besieged his fort and family. Although Chhatrasal repeatedly sought Bajirao's assistance, he was busy in Malwa at the time. He compared his dire situation to that of Gajendra Moksha. In his letter to Bajirao, Chhatrasal wrote the following words:

Know you, that I am in the same sad plight in which the famous elephant was when caught by the crocodile. My valiant race is on point of extinction. Come and save my honour, O Baji Rao.

In March 1729, the Peshwa responded to Chhatrasal's request and marched towards Bundelkhand with 25,000 horsemen and his lieutenants Pilaji Jadhav, Tukoji Pawar, Naro Shankar, and Davalji Somwanshi. Bangash was later forced to leave, signing an agreement that "he would never attack Bundelkhand again". Chhatrasal's position as ruler of Bundelkhand was restored. He granted a large jagir to Bajirao, and gave him his daughter Mastani. Before Chhatrasal's death in December 1731, he ceded one-third of his territories to the Marathas.

=== The Portuguese ===
The Luso–Maratha War of 1729–1732 was an armed conflict between the Portuguese Empire and the Maratha Confederacy, who invaded Portuguese territory in India. This conflict resulted in a Portuguese victory. The Marathas withdrew from Portuguese territory. Nevertheless, Bajirao planned to resume hostilities against the Portuguese with an attack on Salcette Island on 13 March 1733. Peace would prove to be short, as five years later the Marathas would again invade Portuguese territory and attack Bassein.

=== Gujarat ===
After consolidating Maratha influence in central India, Bajirao decided to assert the Maratha right to collect taxes from the wealthy province of Gujarat and sent a Maratha force under Chimaji Appa there in 1730. Sarbuland Khan, the province's Mughal governor, ceded the right to collect chauth to the Marathas. He was soon replaced by Abhay Singh, who also recognized the Maratha right to collect taxes. This irked Shahu's senapati (commander-in-chief), Trimbak Rao Dabhade, whose ancestors had raided Gujarat several times and asserted their right to collect taxes from the province. Annoyed at Bajirao's control of what he considered his family's sphere of influence, he rebelled against the Peshwa. Two other Maratha nobles from Gujarat, Damaji Rao Gaekwad and Kadam Bande, also sided with Dabhade.

After Girdhar Bahadur's defeat in 1728, the Mughal emperor had appointed Jai Singh II to subdue the Marathas. Jai Singh recommended a peaceful agreement; the emperor disagreed, replacing him with Muhammad Khan Bangash. Bangash formed an alliance with the Nizam, Trimbak Rao and Sambhaji II. Bajirao learned that Dabhade and Gaikwad had made preparations for an open fight on the plain of Dabhoi with a force of 40 thousand, while Bajirao's numbers hardly reached 25 thousand in all. Bajirao repeatedly sent messages to Dabhade to solve the dispute amicably in the presence of Shahu. Bajirao resolved the dispute with Sambhaji II on 13 April by signing the Treaty of Warna, which demarcated the territories of Shahu and Sambhaji II. The Nizam met Bajirao at Rohe-Rameshwar on 27 December 1732, and promised not to interfere with Maratha expeditions.

Shahu and Bajirao avoided a rivalry with the powerful Dabhade clan after subduing Trimbak Rao; Trimbak's son, Yashwant Rao, was appointed as Shahu's senapati. The Dabhade clan were allowed to continue collecting chauth from Gujarat if they deposited half the revenue in Shahu's treasury.

=== Siddis ===
The Siddis of Janjira controlled a small, strategically important territory on India's west coast. Although they originally held only the Janjira fort, after Shivaji's death they expanded their rule to a large part of central and northern Konkan. After the death of Siddi chief Yakut Khan in 1733, a war of succession broke out among his sons; one, Abdul Rehman, asked Bajirao for help. Bajirao sent a Maratha force led by Sekhoji Angre, son of Kanhoji Angre. The Marathas regained control of several portions of the Konkan, and besieged Janjira. Their strength was diverted after Peshwa's rival, Pant Pratinidhi, occupied Raigad Fort (near Janjira) in June 1733. Sekhoji Angre died in August (further weakening the Maratha position), and Bajirao signed a peace treaty with the Siddis. He allowed the Siddis to retain control of Janjira if they accepted Abdul Rehman as the ruler; they were also allowed to retain control of Anjanvel, Gowalkot and Underi. The Marathas retained Raigad, Rewas, Thal and Chaul.

The Siddis launched an offensive to regain their lost territories soon after the Peshwa returned to Satara, then Bajirao dispatched a force to prevent them from taking over Raigad Fort in June 1734. Chimnaji made a surprise attack on a Siddi camp near Rewas on 19 April 1736, killing about 1,500 (including their leader, Siddi Sat). In June 1736, Bajirao dispatched a force under Yesaji Gaikwad, Dhanaji Thorat and Sidoji Barge to gain the control territories like Gowalkot. On 25 September of that year, the Siddis signed a peace treaty which confined them to Janjira, Gowalkot and Anjanvel.

=== Rajputana ===
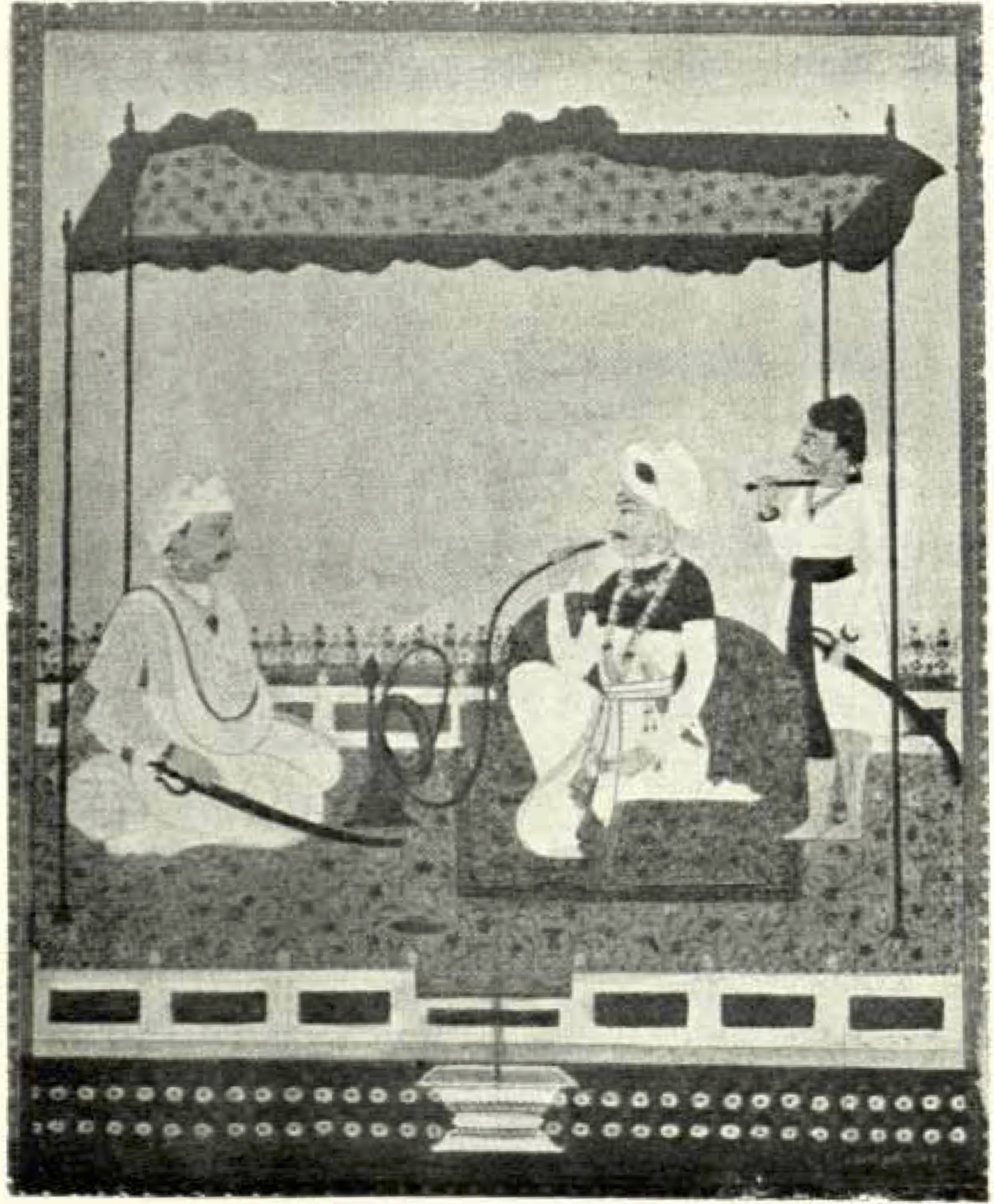
Bajirao and Malhar Rao Holkar c. 18th century

With Shahu's consent, Bajirao began a northward journey on 9 October 1735. Accompanied by his wife, Kashibai, he intended to visit Rajput courts and persuade them to agree to his demands. Bajirao arrived at Mewar's southern frontier in January 1736, where Rana Jagat Singh II had made arrangements for his visit.

Diplomatic talks got underway. Bajirao also visited Jagmandir Palace, in the centre of Pichola Lake (at Rana Jagat Singh's invitation), and Nath-Dwara. After resolving matters in Mewar, Bajirao advanced towards Jaipur. Jai Singh hastened south with his forces, and they met in Bhambholao (near Kishangarh).

Their meeting lasted for several days. There were several demands of Bajirao such as, (a) full control over Malwa from the Mughal Emperor, (b) the right to nominate all Mughal officials of the Deccan, (c) immediate cash payments to meet his war expenses, (d) jagir grants to his most loyal leaders and for himself, (e) personal rights to 5% of the revenue of the Deccan, (f) Cession of the holy places of Hindu worship such as Prayag, Kashi, Gaya and Mathura. Bajirao then returned to the Deccan. The emperor did not agree to his demands, however, and he planned to march on Delhi to force him to agree.

=== March to Delhi ===
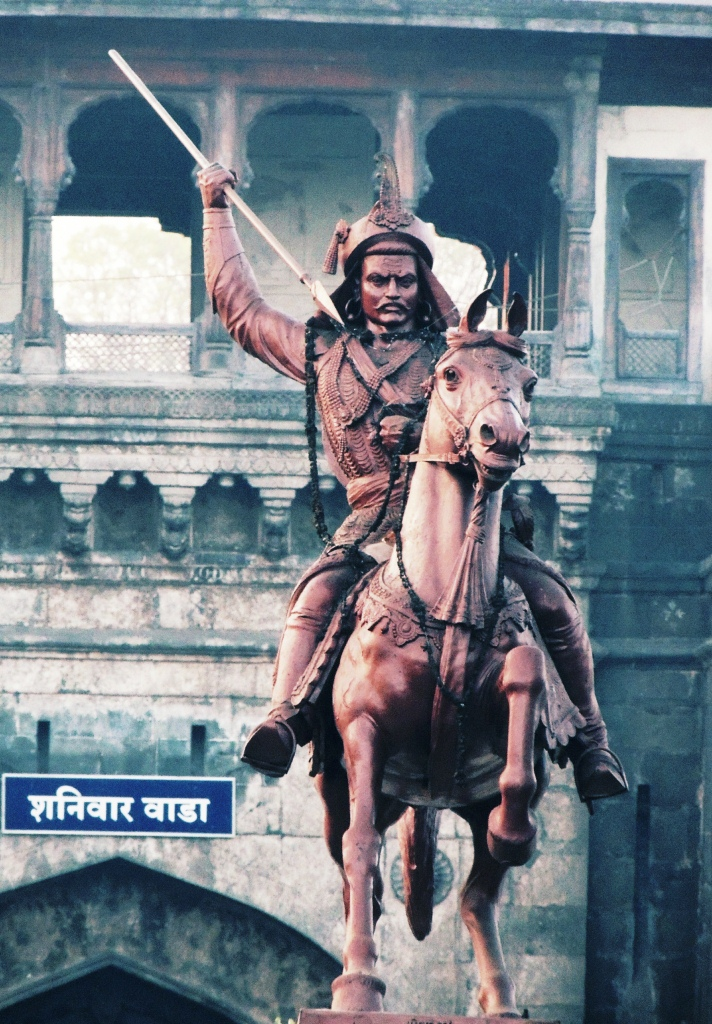
Equestrian statue of Peshwa Bajirao I outside Shaniwar Wada, Pune

After the death of Trimbak Rao, Bangash's alliance against the Marathas fell apart. The Mughal emperor recalled him from Malwa, and re-appointed Jai Singh II as the governor of Malwa. However, the Maratha chief Holkar defeated Jai Singh in the 1733 Battle of Mandsaur. After two more battles, the Mughals decided to offer the Marathas the right to collect the equivalent of ₹22 lakh in chauth from Malwa. On 4 March 1736, Bajirao and Jai Singh reached an agreement at Kishangad. Jai Singh convinced the emperor to agree to the plan, and Bajirao was appointed deputy governor of the region. Jai Singh is believed to have secretly informed Bajirao that it was a good time to subdue the weakening Mughal emperor.

Learning of the advancing Maratha army, the Mughal emperor asked Saadat Ali Khan I to march from Agra and check the advance. The Maratha chiefs Malhar Rao Holkar, Vithoji Bule and Pilaji Jadhav crossed Yamuna and plundered the Mughal territories in the Doab. Saadat Khan led a force of 150,000, defeated them at Jalesar, and retired to Mathura. Malhar Rao Holkar rejoined Bajirao's army near Gwalior. Samsam-ud-Daulah, Mir Bakshi and Muhammad Khan Bangash invited Saadat Ali Khan to a banquet in Samsam-ud-Daulah's tent in Mathura, thinking that the Marathas had retreated to the Deccan. During the feast, they learnt Bajirao had slipped along the Jat and Mewati hill route (avoiding the direct Agra-Delhi route) and was at Delhi. The Mughal commanders left the feast and began a hasty return to capital. The Mughal emperor dispatched a force, led by Mir Hasan Khan Koka, to check Bajirao's advance. The Marathas defeated his force on 28 March 1737 in outskirts of Delhi at Rikabganj. When the news of the defeat of the Mughal troops by the Marathas spread, a sudden fear seized the citizens of Delhi who expected the attack of the Maratha conqueror any moment. But Baji Rao did not proceed with his victory although he could have taken the city unopposed. He had received intelligence that the Vazir with his army was coming towards Delhi in rapid marches when he heard that Baji Rao was before the gates of the capital. The Peshwa realised that any further stay in the city would greatly imperil his position and endanger the lines of communication with the Maratha mainland. He was content with the imperial offer of the Viceroyalty of Malwa. He, therefore, left Delhi with his soldiers towards the south. During his way back he encountered the Mughal Vizier Qamar-ud Din Khan at Badshahpur. After a long and tiring march following a heavy engagement, the Peshwa was in no mood to attack the Vazir. Neither could the Vazir array his forces for battle, as his artillery and a part of his men were yet on the road. There was a brush between the two forces in the failing light of the day; one elephant and a few horses were seized by the Marathas with the loss of 30 men at their side. Afterwards, they moved another eight miles before encamping for the night. Finding himself heavily outnumbered to the Wazir's army and possibility of reinforcement from the other Mughal nobles he made a decision to quickly retreat from Badshahpur during early night. Passing through Rajputana Bajirao reached Narnol and then Ajmer. The Mughals could not pursue the Marathas and the Emperor had recalled them to Delhi. The Rajput princes once again affirmed their loyalty to the Peshwa and solicited his protection.

This event caused great consternation and dismay in the capital. Although the Peshwa left the city suddenly, he exposed the weakness of the government. The demoralizing effect which the Peshwa's surprise attack produced on the army and the citizens of Delhi was permanent.

=== Battle of Bhopal ===
Mughal emperor Muhammad Shah sought help from the Nizam after Bajirao's march to Delhi; the Nizam set out from the Deccan, met Bajirao's returning force at Sironj, and told the Peshwa he was going to Delhi to repair his relationship with the Mughal emperor. The Nizam was joined by other Mughal chiefs, and a 30,000-man Mughal army (reinforced by artillery), was dispatched against Bajirao. The Peshwa assembled an 80,000-man force. To counter aid to the Nizam from the Deccan, Bajirao stationed a force of 10,000 (under Chimaji Appa) on the Tapti River with instructions to prevent Nasir Jung from advancing beyond Burhanpur. He and his forces crossed the Narmada in early December 1737, communicating with agents and spies posted to observe enemy moves. The Nizam sheltered in Bhopal, a fortified town with a lake at his rear, to keep his army and artillery secure.

The Nizam, unable to hold out any longer, signed a peace agreement at Doraha on 7 January 1738. Malwa was ceded to the Marathas; the Mughals agreed to pay the equivalent of ₹5,000,000 in reparations, with the Nizam swearing on the Quran to abide by the treaty.

=== Deccan ===
Between 1738 and 1740, Nader Shah launched an invasion of India. In response to this threat, Mughal Emperor Muhammad Shah summoned the Nizam of Hyderabad, Asaf Jah, to Delhi. Accepting the emperor's request, Asaf Jah mobilized his army and marched to Delhi in a bid to resist the invasion.

In the absence of the Nizam, Bajirao launched an attack on Hyderabad with the aim of capturing the six provinces of Deccan. Having already secured Malwa through the Battle of Bhopal from Jai Singh II, Bajirao sought to expand Maratha influence by targeting Hyderabad in the absence of the Nizam. In December 1739, Bajirao led a formidable force of 50,000 horse and foot soldiers towards Hyderabad. Nasir Jung, having received intelligence about the Marathas' intent to capture the Deccan in the absence of his father, mobilized 10,000 soldiers and marched against Bajirao. The Battle ensued after both parties crossed the Godavari River.

In the ensuing battle, according to some sources, Bajirao suffered defeat, and his army was compelled to make a humiliating peace treaty, marking a significant setback for the Maratha forces. However, based on alternative accounts, Bajirao attempted to alleviate his sorrow through engaging in wartime activities. When his request for additional territories from the Nizam to establish a northern route was unsuccessful, he laid siege to Nasir Jang, the Nizam's son, in the Aurangabad fort, ultimately forcing him to relinquish the districts of Nemad and Khargon.

According to some historical sources, Peshwa Bajirao's last battle took place in Rawarkhedi, Madhya Pradesh in 1739, against Nasir Jung, the Nizam's son. Nasir Jung lost the battle and escaped. Nasir sued for peace and an agreement was signed between Bajirao and Nasir. According to which, Marathas were deprived of their authority to collect chauth from the six provinces of Deccan, Bajirao promised to not invade the Deccan again. Khargone and Handia, previously promised by the Nizam, were formally ceded to the Maratha Empire.

This marked the final military engagement for Bajirao, as he died in April 1740 following the conclusion of this conflict.

== Battle tactics, character and legacy ==
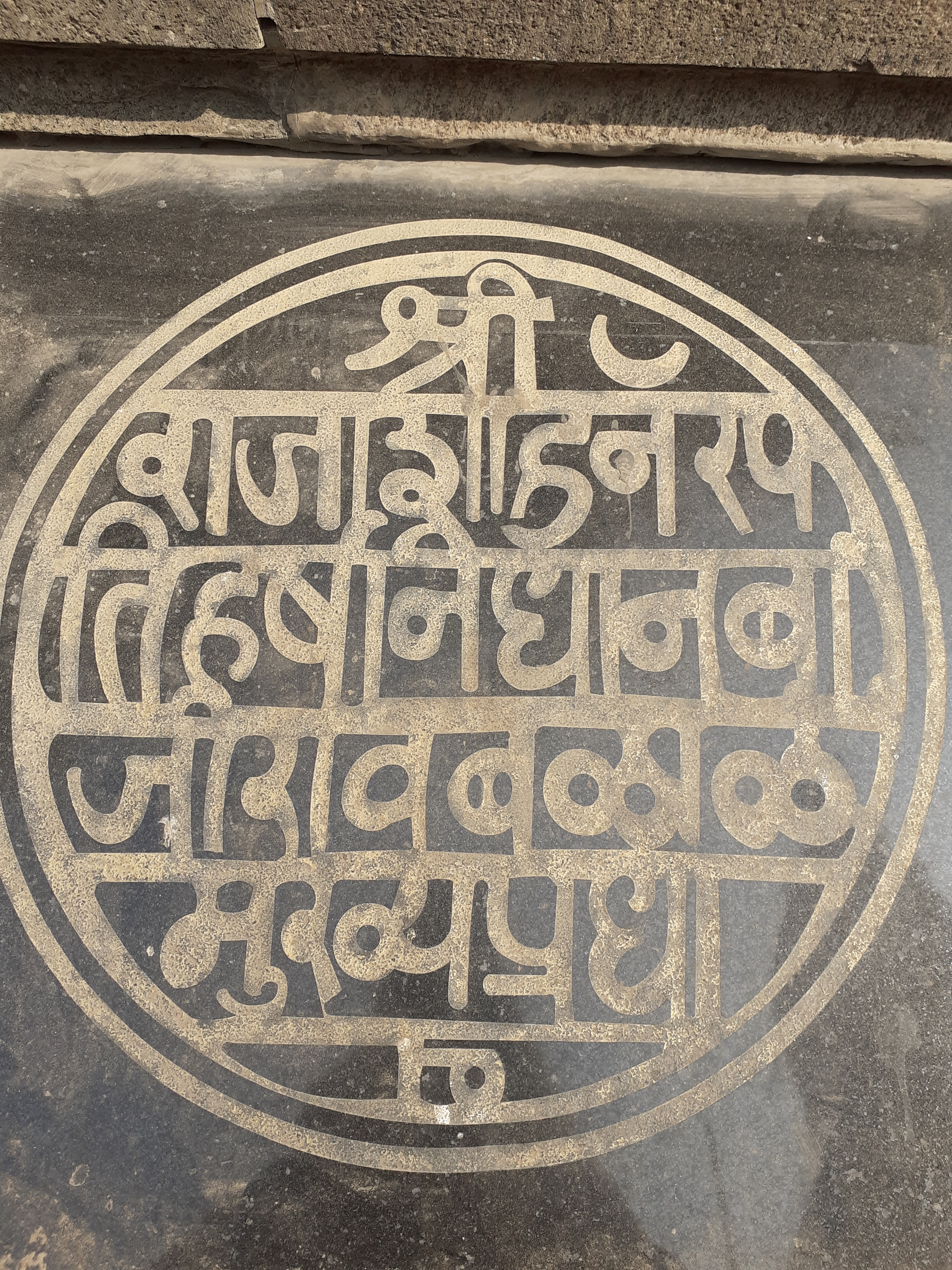
Seal of Bajirao I

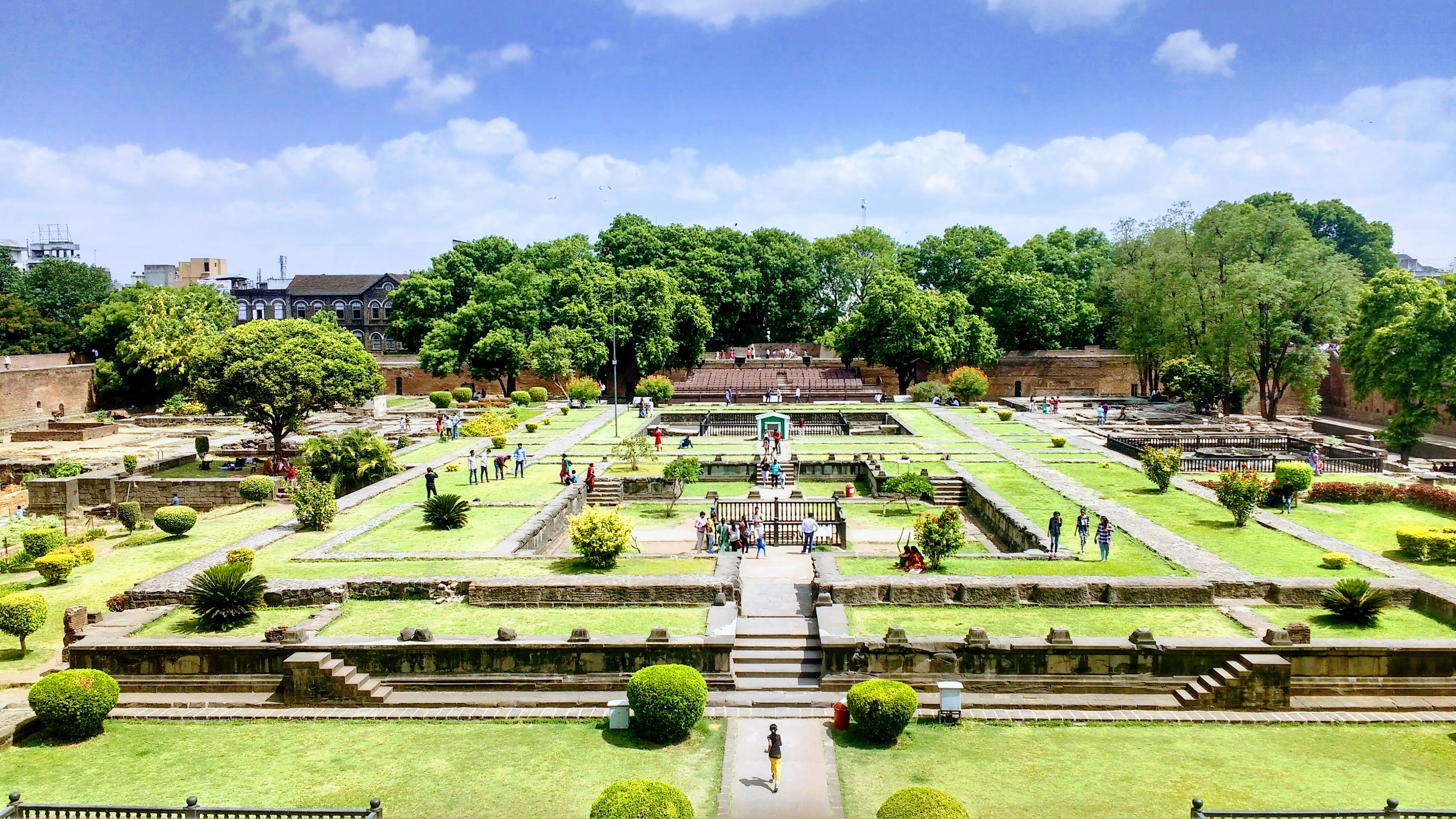
The Shaniwar Wada fortress in Pune was built as the seat of the Peshwa rulers during Bajirao's reign.

Bajirao was known for rapid tactical movements in battle, using cavalry. British field marshal Bernard Montgomery studied Bajirao's tactics in the Palkhed campaign, particularly his rapid movements and his troops' ability to live off the land (with little concern about supply and communication lines) while conducting "maneuver warfare" against the enemy. In his book, A Concise History of Warfare, Montgomery wrote the following about Bajirao's victory at Palkhed:

They (Marathas) were at their best in the eighteenth century, and the Palkhed campaign of 1727–28 in which Baji Rao I outgeneralled Nizam-ul-Mulk, is a masterpiece of strategic mobility. Baji Rao's army was a purely mounted force, armed only with sabre, lance, a bow in some units and a round shield. There was a spare horse for every two men. The Marathas moved unencumbered by artillery, baggage, or even handguns and defensive armour. They supplied themselves by looting.

Montgomery further wrote,

Baji Rao resented the Nizam's rule over the Deccan and it was he who struck the first blow. In October 1727, as soon as rainy season ended, Baji Rao burst into the territories of Nizam. The lightly equipped Marathas moved with great rapidity, avoiding the main towns and fortresses, living off the country, burning and plundering. They met one reverse at the hands of Nizam's able lieutenant, Iwaz Khan, at the beginning of November 1727, but within a month they had fully recovered and were off again, dashing east, north, west, with sudden changes in direction. The Nizam had mobilised his forces, and for a time pursued them, but he was bewildered by the swift unpredictable movements of Marathas, and his men became exhausted.

Bajirao is considered one of celebrated personality in the history of Maratha Empire by many historians.

In his introduction to Bajirao I: The Great Peshwa, K. M. Panikkar wrote:

Baji Rao, the great Peshwa, was without doubt the most outstanding statesman and general India produced in [the] 18th century. If Shivaji Maharaj was the founder of Maratha State, Baji Rao could claim that he was the one who saved it from disruption and transformed what was national state in[to] an Empire.

He is also considered to be one of the greatest military generals of his time. Jadunath Sarkar called Bajirao, "a heavenly-born cavalry leader". Also describing his twenty years military career, Jadunath Sarkar wrote:

Twenty years spent in breathless activity and tireless journeys across the Indian continent, from Delhi to Srirangpatan and Gujarat to Hyderabad, wore out the most wonderful man of action that the Hindu race has produced since the days of the great Shivaji Maharaj.

Shahu also had an implicit faith on Bajirao. On the other occasion he has called Bajirao as "the man with iron nerves".

Bajirao's letter to Chimaji Appa

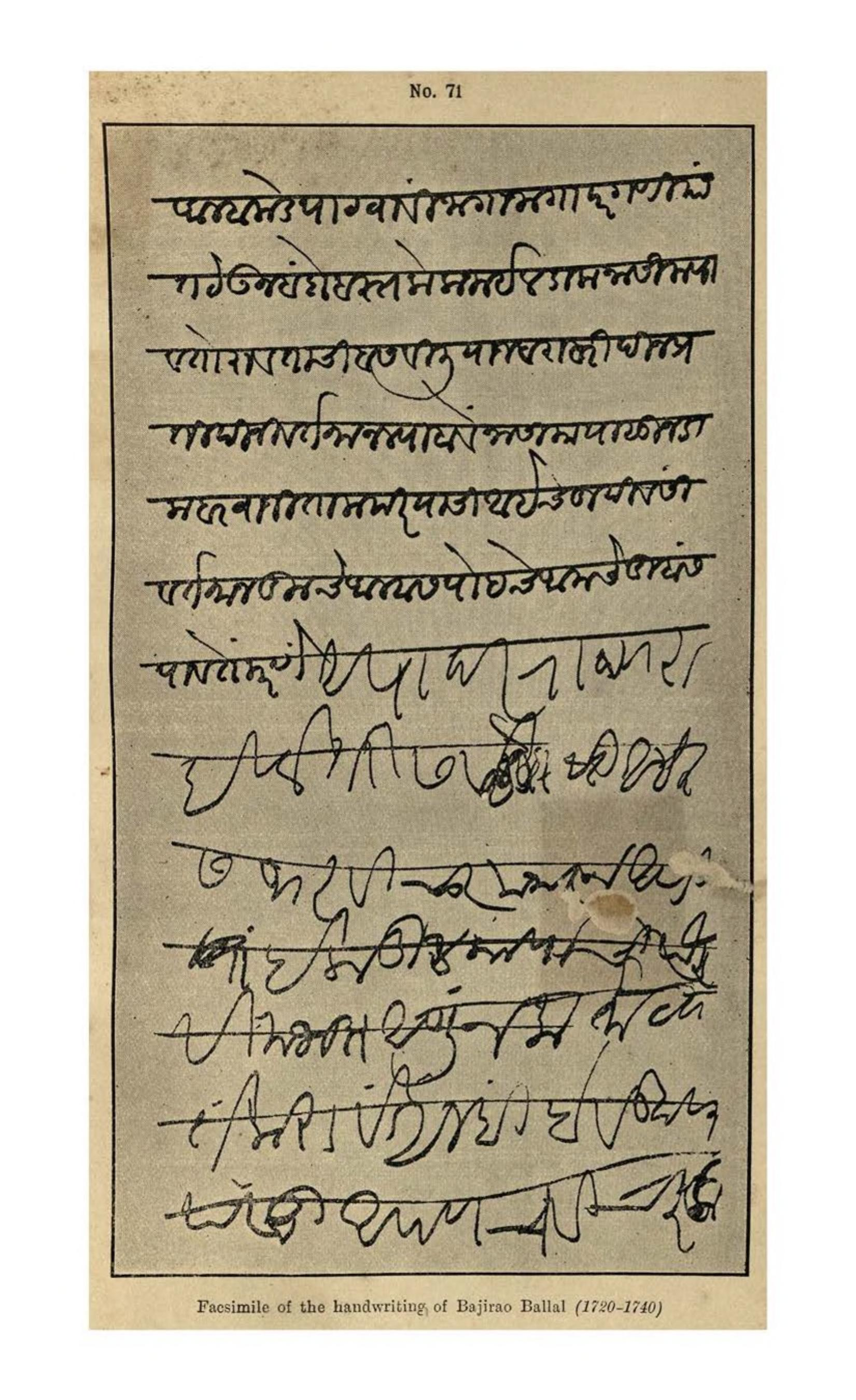
31 Mar 1739; Bajirao asks his brother Chimaji Appa to send reencorcements to Delhi to counter Nadir Shah

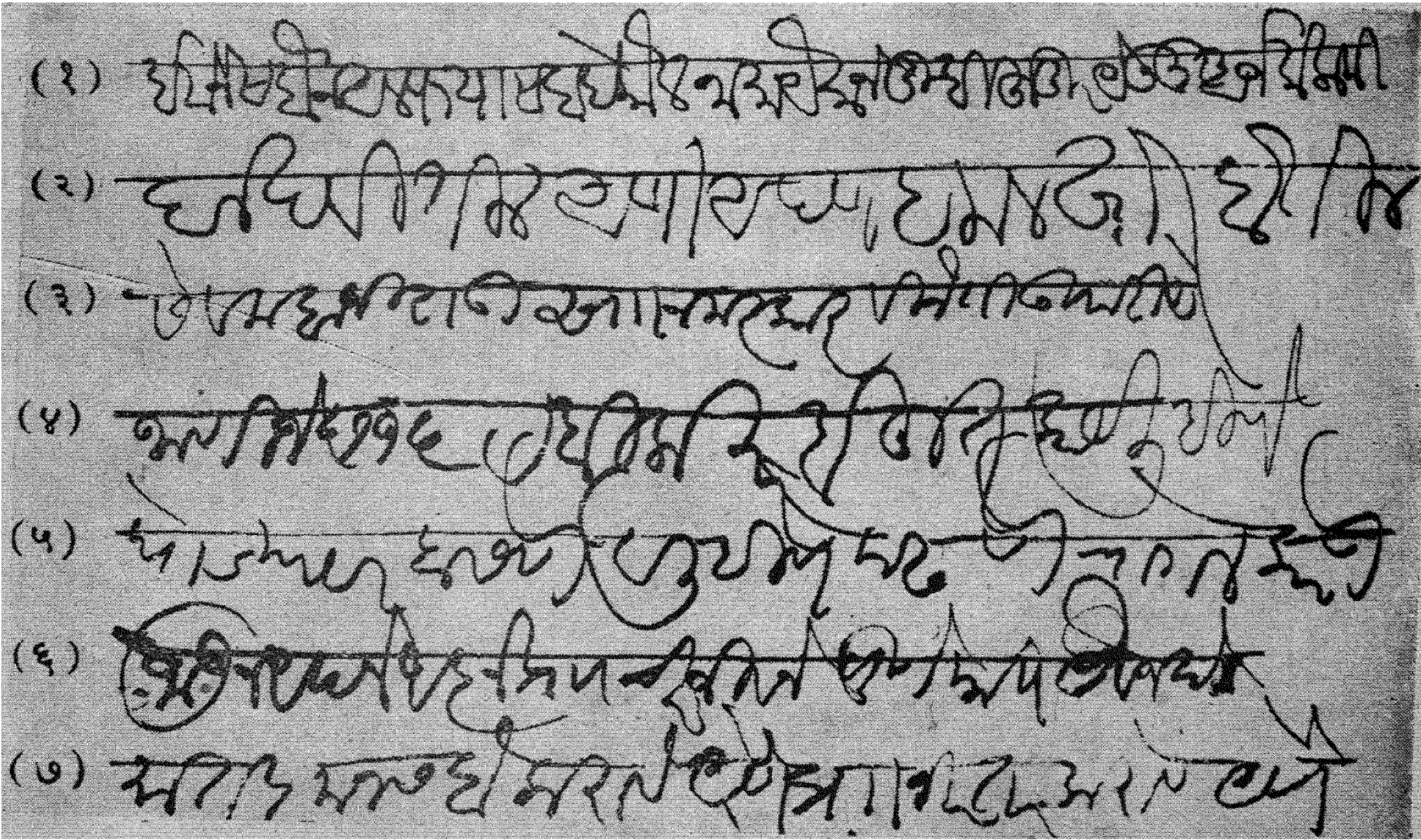
Signatures of the Marathas line 3 is the handwriting of Bajirao

== Personal life ==
Bajirao's first wife was Kashibai. Bajirao always treated his wife Kashibai with love and respect. Their relationship was healthy and happy. They had four sons: Balaji Bajirao (also called Nanasaheb), Ramachandra Rao, Raghunath Rao and Janardhan Rao, who died at an early age. Nanasaheb was appointed Peshwa by Shahu in 1740, succeeding his father.

Bajirao took Mastani as his wife. The relationship was a political one, arranged to please Chhatrasal. Mastani had a son, Krishna Rao, in 1734. Since his mother was Muslim, Hindu priests refused to conduct the upanayana ceremony and he became known as Shamsher Bahadur. After the deaths of Bajirao and Mastani in 1740, Kashibai raised six-year-old Shamsher Bahadur as her own. Shamsher received a portion of his father's dominion of Banda and Kalpi. In 1761, he and his army fought alongside the Peshwa in the Third Battle of Panipat between the Marathas and the Afghans. Wounded in the battle, Shamsher died several days later in Deeg.

== Death ==
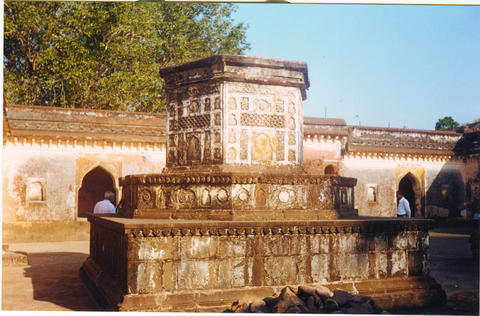
Baji Rao I memorial at Raverkhedi

Due to ceaseless wars and military campaigns, Bajirao had become exhausted. He first fell ill on 23 April, when the symptoms were mild. By the third day, the fever had grown to such an extent that Bajirao became delirious. He died on Sunday, 28 April 1740 at night, after about 8:30 p.m. He was cremated the same day on the bank of the Narmada River. Balaji Bajirao ordered Ranoji Shinde to build a chhatri as a memorial. The memorial is enclosed by a dharmashala. The compound has a temple known as Rameshwar Temple, dedicated to Shiva.

== In popular culture ==
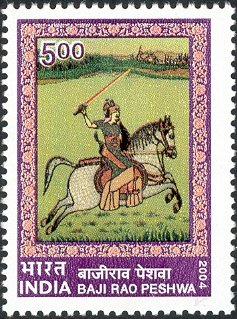
Baji Rao Peshwa on Indian Stamp 2004

- Character of Bajirao is portrayed in the Marathi audio web series 'Shrimant Kashibai Bajirao Peshwe' created by Cultural Legacy of India.
- Bajirao Mastani, a 1925 Indian silent film about the Peshwa directed by Nanubhai B. Desai and Bhalji Pendharkar.
- Rau, a 1972 fictional Marathi novel by Nagnath S. Inamdar, featured a love story of Bajirao I and Mastani.
- Mastani, 1955 film directed by Dhirubhai Desai. It starred Nigar Sultana, Manher Desai, Shahu Modak and Agha.
- The 2015 historical drama film Bajirao Mastani, directed by Sanjay Leela Bhansali, starred Ranveer Singh as Bajirao I.
- Shrimant Peshwa Bajirao Mastani, another Indian TV series broadcast on ETV Marathi in 2015.
- Peshwa Bajirao, a 2017 TV series starring Rudra Soni as young Bajirao and Karan Suchak as the adult Bajirao, aired on Sony TV.

== See also ==
- Maratha rulers

Preceded by Balaji Vishwanath Bhat	Peshwa; 1720–1740	Succeeded by Balaji Baji Rao
