= Ranjit Vilas Palace (Rajkot) =

Indian royal family residence

Coordinates: 22.2935°N 70.8093°E

The Ranjit Vilas Palace is a palace in the city of Rajkot, Gujarat and is the residence of the royal family of the erstwhile Rajkot State.

== History ==
Ranjit Vilas was built in 1870 by the then Thakor Sahib of Rajkot, Bawajiraj Mehrmansinhji. The construction of the palace was begun as a famine relief measure following the famine of 1847. Before it shifted to the Ranjit Vilas, the royal residence was the Durbargadh Palace which thereafter continued to house offices of the Rajkot State and, after India’s independence, those of the government of Gujarat.

== Location and architecture ==
The palace is located on Palace Road, Rajkot and its estate covers an area of 225 acres. The palace is built in the Gothic style and has 100 rooms spread over six acres. The palace garage contains a collection of vintage cars of the Rajkot State. A temple dedicated to Ashapura Mata stands on the palace premises.

== Recent history ==
The palace continues to be the residence of the royal family of Rajkot, being one of the few palaces of erstwhile ruling families that have not been opened to the public as heritage hotels, and hosts family and political functions involving the royal family. In 2020, it was the venue of the coronation of the current Thakor Saheb of Rajkot, Mandhatasinh Jadeja who succeeded his father Manoharsinhji Pradyumansinhji. The palace is also part of an ongoing property dispute between Jadeja and his sister. The design for the façade of the new international airport at Rajkot has been inspired by the Ranjit Vilas Palace and the use of jalis in palaces as a means of controlling internal temperatures in buildings.
