= Thakore =

Thakore is the name of:

- Anand Thakore (born 1971), Indian poet and Hindustani classical vocalist
- Balwantray Thakore (1869–1952), Indian poet and playwright
- Dolly Thakore (born 1943), Indian actress
- Elakshiben Thakore (born 1936), Indian dancer

== See also ==
- Thakor, a subcaste of Koli community of Gujarat
- Thakor (name), including a list of people with the name
- Thakur (title), a historical feudal title of the Indian subcontinent
- Thakore Saheb of Rajkot (disambiguation)
