= Manoharsinhji Pradyumansinhji =

Indian cricketer

Manoharsinh Jadeja

15th Thakore Saheb of Rajkot State
- In office November 1973 – September 2018
- Preceded by: Pradyumansinhji Jadeja
- Succeeded by: Mandhatasinhji Jadeja

Cabinet Minister of Finance, Health, and Youth Services in Gujarat
- In office 1980–1985
- Constituency: Rajkot South

MLA of Gujarat State
- In office 1967–1971
- Constituency: Rajkot West
- In office 1980–1985
- Constituency: Rajkot South
- In office 1990–1995
- Constituency: Rajkot West

Personal details
- Born: 18 November 1935 Rajkot, Rajkot State, British India
- Died: 27 September 2018 (aged 82) Rajkot, Gujarat, India
- Parent: Pradyumansinhji Lakhajirajsinhji (father)
- Relatives: Lakhajirajsinhji II Bavajirajsinhji (grandfather)
- Education: Rajkumar College; Elphinstone College
- Cricket career

Cricket information
- Batting: Right-handed

Domestic team information
- Years: Team
- 1956–1963: Saurashtra

Career statistics
Competition	First-class
Matches	14
Runs scored	614
Batting average	29.23
100s/50s	1/4
Top score	144
Balls bowled	356
Wickets	5
Bowling average	58.40
5 wickets in innings	0
10 wickets in match	0
Best bowling	2/33
Catches/stumpings	3/–
- Source: CricketArchive, 12 December 2012

Manoharsinhji Pradyumansinhji Jadeja (18 November 1935 – 27 September 2018) was an Indian politician.

== Early life ==
The eldest son of Pradyumansinhji Lakhajirajsinhji, the 14th Thakore Saheb, Manoharsinhji was born at the Ranjit Vilas Palace in Rajkot. He was educated at Rajkumar College, Rajkot, and at Elphinstone College, Mumbai. Manoharsinhji had a bachelor of arts honours degree and a bachelor of laws degree. He was awarded a Master of Laws degree from the University of London.

== Cricketing career ==
Like his father and grandfather (the 12th Thakore Saheb), Manoharsinhji was a keen cricketer, and made his first-class debut for Saurashtra against Gujarat in the 1955–56 Ranji Trophy, scoring 59 runs in his first innings. Manoharsinhji served as captain of the team from the 1957–58 season onwards, and was a regular in the team until his retirement after the 1963–64 season. Usually playing as a top order batsman, his highest first-class score (and only century) was an innings of 144 runs against Gujarat in December 1957. Overall, Manoharsinhji played 14 first-class matches, scoring 614 runs at an average of 29.23.

== Political career ==
Standing for the Indian National Congress in the constituency of Rajkot, Manoharsinhji was elected to the Gujarat Legislative Assembly in 1967, and served until 1971. Upon the death of his father in November 1973, he acceded to the title of Thakore Saheb. The title had afforded no powers or privileges since Indian independence in 1947, and serves merely as a courtesy, although property attached to the title remains with the Thakore Saheb. Manoharsinhji served two further terms as a member of the Gujarat Legislative Assembly for the Rajkot (I) constituency—from 1980 to 1985 and 1990 to 1995—and occupied a number of positions in the cabinet, including Minister for Finance, Minister for Youth Services, and Minister for Health. From 1998, he served as a vice-president of the Gujarat Pradesh Congress Committee, the state division of the Indian National Congress. Politically, Manoharsinhji is generally known under the name "Manoharsinh Jadeja", deriving from his family's dynastic name.

== Personal life ==
Manoharsinhji married Mankumari Devi Sahiba, the second daughter of Tej Singh Prabhakar, Maharaja of Alwar, in 1949, and had one son and four daughters. In November 2010 he purchased the Star of India, a vintage Rolls-Royce car custom-built for his grandfather Dharmendrasinhji Lakhajiraj in 1934. The car had been outside of the family for 42 years, as a part of Bill Meredith-Owens' Collection and was once the most expensive car in the world.

== Death ==
Manoharsinhji died at his house at the Ranjit Vilas Palace on 27 September 2018.

Regnal titles
Preceded by Pradyumansinhji	15th Thakore Saheb of Rajkot; 1973–2018	Succeeded by Mandhatasinhji
