= Alfred High School =

Alfred High School may refer to:

- Alfred High School (Rajkot)
- Alfred High School (Bhuj)
