= Nitish =

- Gender: Male
- Language: Sanskrit

Origin
- Region of origin: India

Nitish is an Indian male given name from Sanskrit meaning "ruler of guidance". Notable people with the name include:

- Nitish Beejan, Mauritian politician
- Nitish Bharadwaj, Indian actor
- Nitish Chavan (born 1990), Indian Marathi film and television actor
- Nitish Jain, Indian educationist
- Nitish Katara, Indian business executive murdered in 2002
- Nitish Kumar, Bihar Chief Minister
- Nitish Kumar (cricketer), Canadian cricketer
- Nitish Chandra Laharry (1892–1964), Indian lawyer, social worker and film producer
- Nitish Mishra, Indian politician
- Nitish Naik, Indian cardiologist
- Nitish Rana, Indian cricketer
- Nitish Kumar Reddy, Indian cricketer
- Nitish Roy, Indian film art director
- Nitish Sengupta, Indian Armed Services officer
- Nitish V. Thakor (born 1952), American biomedical engineer
- Nitish Veera (1975/6 – 2021), Indian actor who worked in Tamil-language films
