= Thakor (name) =

Thakor is a surname, deriving from Thakor, a title of the Koli caste of Gujarat.

People with the name include:

== Given name ==
- Thakor Patel (born 1932), Indian-born Zimbabwean painter

== Surname ==
- Alpeshji Thakor, Indian politician
- Pareshji Thakor, Indian Graphics Designer
- Bapu Velnath Thakor, saint of Girnar, Gujarat from Kshatriya koli community
- Dilipkumar Viraji Thakor (born 1959), Indian politician
- Gabhaji Mangaji Thakor, Indian politician
- Jagdish Thakor, Indian politician
- Kamlesh Thakor (born 1992), Indian cricketer
- Kanaji Thakor, Indian politician
- Nitish V. Thakor (born 1952), American biomedical engineering professor
- Shambhuji Thakor, Indian politician
- Shiv Thakor (born 1993), English cricketer

== See also ==
- Thakore, a name
- Thakur (disambiguation)
