= Thakore Saheb of Rajkot =

Thakore Saheb of Rajkot is an Indian princely title, in existence since 1620. Notable people holding the title include:

- Lakhajirajsinhji II Bavajirajsinhji (1885–1930), 12th Thakore Saheb, Indian nobleman and cricketer
- Pradyumansinhji Lakhajirajsinhji (1913–1973), 14th Thakore Saheb Indian nobleman and cricketer
- Manoharsinh P. Jadeja (1935–2018), 15th Thakore Saheb, Indian politician and cricketer
