= Leeli =

Village in Alwar district, India

Leeli is a village in the Alwar district of Rajasthan in India. With 727 families, it is the largest village located in Malakhera Tehsil.

== Demographics ==
According to the 2011 census, 16.85% of the population is children between the ages of 1 and 6. The average sex ratio is 896, lower than the Rajasthan state average of 928, and the child sex ratio is 875, lower than the Rajasthan average of 888.

Leeli has a higher literacy rate than average for Rajasthan, with rates of 67.74% compared to the average 66.11%. Male literacy rates are at 84.23% while female literacy rates are at 49.42%.

== History ==
Leeli was built in 1710 A.D. by Maharaja Lachhaman. The first Thakurs of Leeli were Somvanshi Kshatriyas, who lived there until the end of the 19th century. The last known Thakur was the late Thakur Shri Bhura Singh Ji, who had two sons, Shri Laxman Singh Ji, and Shri Narayan Singh Ji. As per the constitution of India and the Panchayati Raj Act, established in 1959 in Rajasthan, Leeli is administrated by an elected representative, or a sarpanch (village head). The current Sarpanch is smt. Alka Devi.

== Geography ==
Leeli village is located near Malakhera town, a major town in the Alwar district. Its pin code of locality is 301406. The nearest railway station is Alwar junction, which is around 20 km away. Leeli is also well connected with roadways and is near the Rajasthan State Highway 44.
