= Watson Museum =

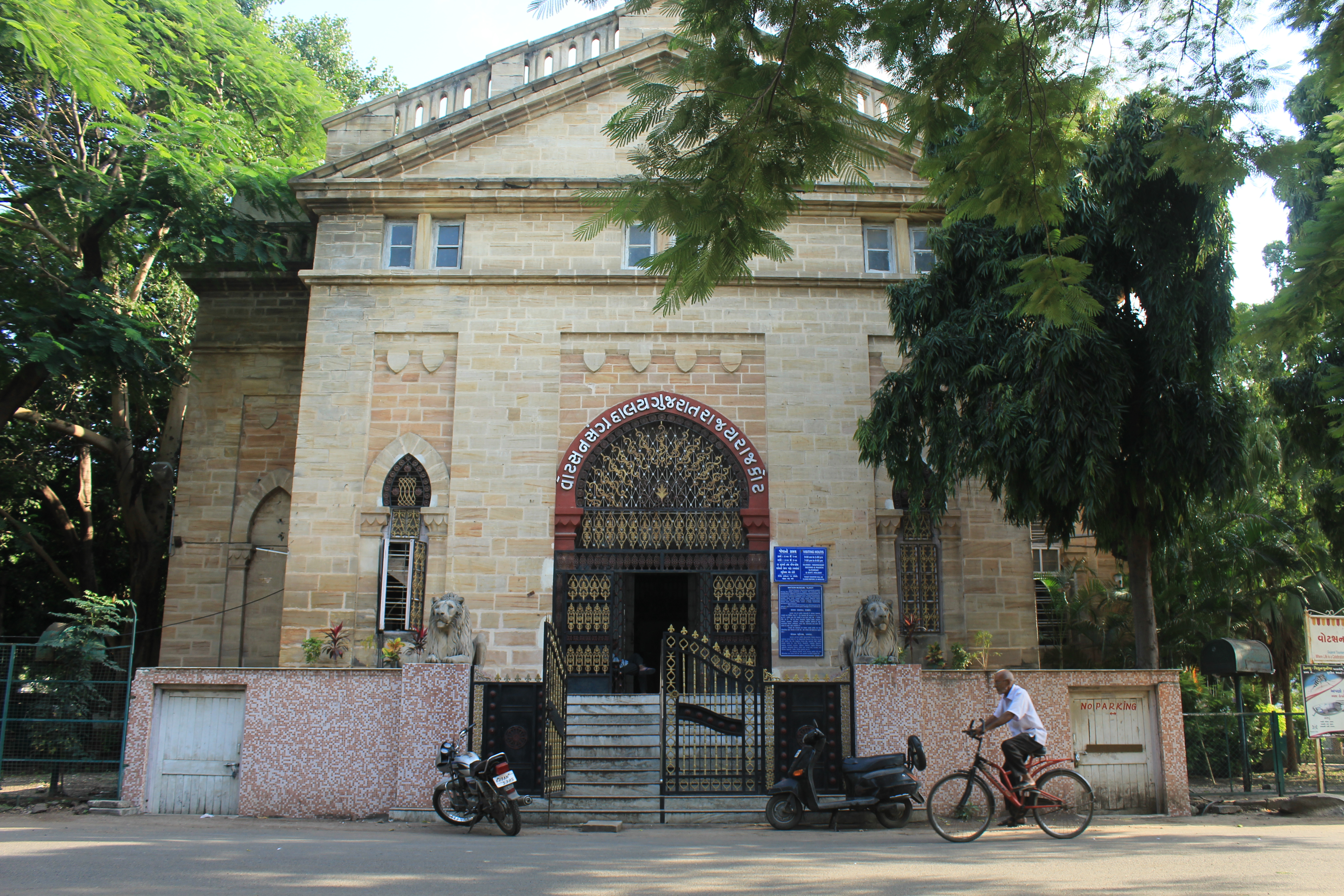
- Established: 1888
- Location: Jubilee Garden, Rajkot
- Coordinates: 22.300431039489755°N 70.80186684323346°E
- Type: Multi Purpose
- Visitors: 78,000 (2007-2008)
- Founder: Colonel John Watson
- Curator: S. M. Dalal

The Watson Museum, considered to be one of the best among the seven such museums located across Saurashtra (region) and managed by the Gujarat state Government, it has collections of precious objects from the princely State of Rajkot founded by the Jadeja Rajputs. It holds invaluable articles, artifacts, photographs, a reference library and the museum's publication are sold through a counter.

== History ==
The museum is set up in the Queen Victoria memorial institute buildings located in Jubilee Garden, Rajkot. The museum was named in fond memory of Colonel John Watson in 1888 who was a British political agent of Kathiawar Agency from 1881 to 1889. Watson Museum is the second most important museum in Gujarat, after the Museum of Baroda and is the oldest museum in Saurashtra (region). Colonel Watson was fond of history and archaeology and used to collect information on Rajkot. Most of his collections and other artifacts are preserved here. The museum building was completed in 1893, and opened to the public by Governor Lord George Harris of Bombay Presidency.

The Watson Museum exhibits artifacts from Mohenjodaro, natural history, 13th century carvings, temple statues, costumes and design of the houses of the local tribal people. The Watson Museum also houses an excellent collection of traditional, archaeological items and coins.

While the museum's archeology gallery also boasts of artifacts of prehistoric period and the Harappan civilization in the archeology gallery, a treasure of sculptures belonging to erstwhile Ghumali - a capital of Jethwa - grace the sculpture gallery.

== Sections ==
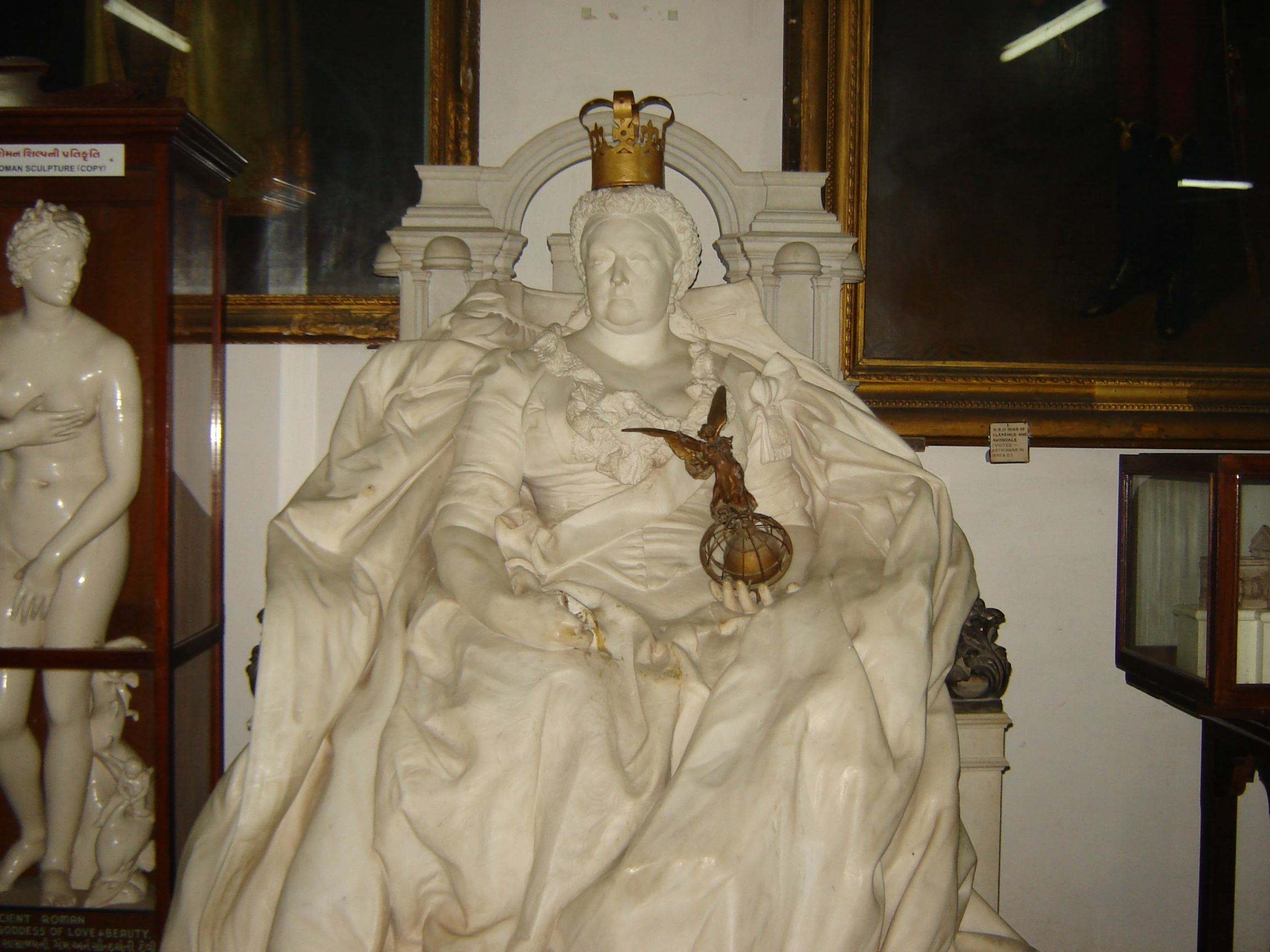
The statue of Queen Victoria, unveiled by the Lord Curzon of Kedleston in 1897

- Sculptures
- Paintings and Manuscripts
- Textile
- Inscription
- Coins
- Anthropology
- Folk Embroidery
- Handicraft
- Musical Instruments
- Wood Work
- Natural History
- Rocks and Minerals

== Annual events ==
1. Bhartiya Shilp Samruddhi : It is week-long celebration organized every year in the second week of January.
