= Pradyumansinhji Lakhajirajsinhji =

Indian cricketer and ruler of Rajkot state

Pradyumansinhji Lakhajirajsinhji, 14th Thakore Saheb of Rajkot
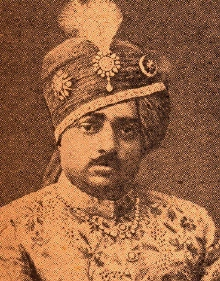

Personal information
- Full name: Pradyumansinhji Lakhajirajsinhji
- Born: 24 February 1913; Rajkot, Rajkot State, British India
- Died: 9 November 1973 (aged 60); Rajkot, Gujarat, India
- Batting: Right-handed
- Relatives: Ranjitsinhji (great-uncle); Lakhajirajsinji (father); Manoharsinhji (son)

Domestic team information
- Years: Team
- 1936–1946: Western India
- 1946–1950: Saurashtra

Career statistics
Competition	First-class
Matches	13
Runs scored	434
Batting average	22.84
100s/50s	0/2
Top score	77
Balls bowled	35
Wickets	1
Bowling average	21.00
5 wickets in innings	0
10 wickets in match	0
Best bowling	1/0
Catches/stumpings	3/–
- Source: CricketArchive, 12 December 2012

Pradyumansinhji Lakhajirajsinhji (24 February 1913 – 9 November 1973), the 14th Thakore Saheb of Rajkot, was an Indian nobleman and ruler of the princely state of Rajkot from June 1940 until the abolition of princely titles in 1971. The third son of Lakhajirajsinhji II Bavajirajsinhji, the 12th Thakore Saheb, Pradyumansinhji succeeded to the title after the death of his older brother, Dharmendrasinhji, on 11 June 1940.

== Sportsman ==
Like his father, who played three first-class matches, Pradyumansinhji had a keen interest in cricket, and was a patron of the game in Gujarat. He made his first-class debut in December 1936, playing for Western India against Gujarat in the 1936–37 Ranji Trophy. A regular player, he served as captain of Western India from the 1940–41 season to its dissolution after the 1945–46 season, a result of his title rather than cricketing ability. From the 1946–47 season to his retirement after the 1950–51 season, he was captain of the Kathiawar team, which from the 1951–52 season played as Saurashtra, representing the eponymous region of India. Pradyumansinhji played almost exclusively as a batsman, although he usually batted in the lower order.

Pradyumansinhji made two half-centuries during his career, with his highest score, an innings of 77 runs, achieved against Maharashtra during the 1948–49 Ranji Trophy. This match was particularly notable for its conclusion, with Pradyumansinhji (as Kathiawar's captain) deciding to concede the match at tea on the third day. Maharashtra were 826/4, with B. B. Nimbalkar having scored 443 not out, the first (and only) quadruple century in Indian first-class cricket, and nine runs behind Sir Donald Bradman's world record score of 452 not out. In a move regarded as highly unsporting, Pradyumansinhji forfeited the match to prevent his team being associated with the breaking of such a record. He played his last first-class match in December 1950.

== Personal life ==
Outside of cricket, Pradyumansinhji lost most of his official power after Indian independence in 1947, when Rajkot was incorporated into United State of Kathiawar (later the United State of Saurashtra). Rajkot's former territory would later become part of Bombay State (November 1956 – May 1960) and Gujarat (May 1960 onwards). After a 1971 amendment to the Constitution of India, Pradyumansinhji was stripped of any legal recognition of his titles (as well as access to the Privy Purse), although he maintained them as a courtesy until his death in November 1973. His son, Manoharsinhji, succeeded him as the merely nominal Thakore Saheb, and also played first-class cricket for Saurashtra.

== Titles ==
- 24 February 1913 – 11 June 1940: Kumar Pradyumansinhji, Yuvraj Saheb of Rajkot
- 11 June 1940 – 28 December 1971: His Highness Thakore Saheb Shri Pradyumansinhji Lakhajirajsinhji, 14th Thakore Saheb of Rajkot
- 28 December 1971 – 9 November 1973: Mr. Pradyumansinhji Lakhajirajsinhji Jadeja

Regnal titles
Preceded by Dharmendrasinhji	14th Thakore Saheb of Rajkot; 1940–1973	Succeeded by Manoharsinhji
