= Mahatma Gandhi Museum, Rajkot =

Alfred High School
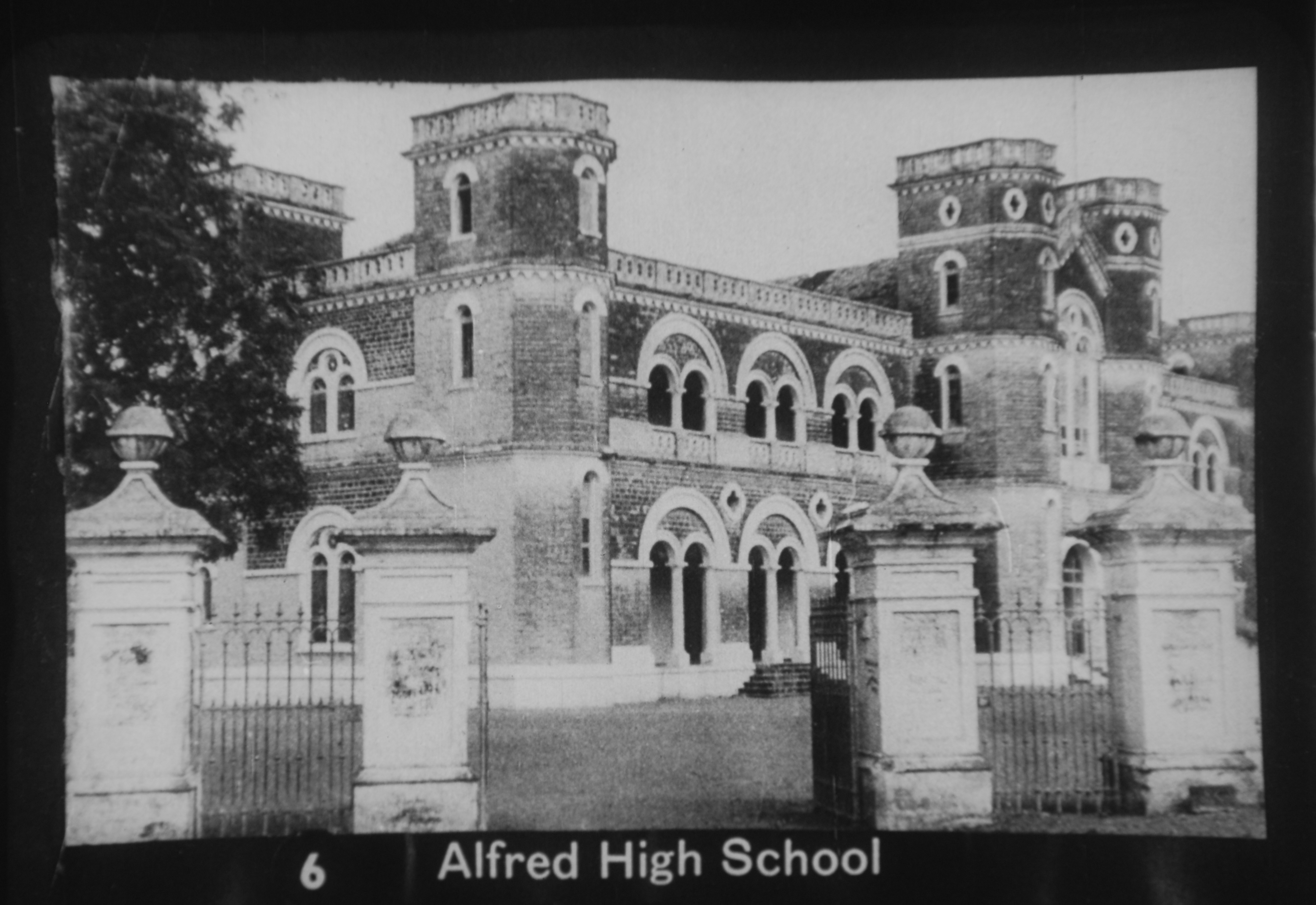
- circa 1948

Information
- Type: Public school (government funded)
- Established: 17 October 1853
- Founder: H.M.S Nawab of Junagadh
- Closed: May 2017
- Nickname: Mohandas Gandhi Vidhyalaya, Kathiawar High School
- Alumni: Mahatma Gandhi, S. R. Rana
- Architect: Sir Robert Bell Booth
- Years active: 164

Mahatma Gandhi Museum was formerly Alfred High School (also known as Mohandas Gandhi High School or Kathiawar High School) in Rajkot was one of the oldest educational institutions in India which was active for 164 years where Mahatma Gandhi studied for a few years.

== History of school ==
This school was constructed during British rule in India by political agent Kernel Singh, and was the first English school in the saurashtra (region). Originally called Rajkot English School, it was founded on 17 October 1853, and later became a full-fledged high school. By 1868 it came to be known as Rajkot High School, and was named Alfred High School in 1907. The present buildings of the Alfred High School were built for Kathiawar by the Nawab of Junagadh, Nawab Nawab Sir Muhammad Bahadur Khanji Babi, and was named Prince Alfred, the Duke of Edinburgh, as a memorial. This school was opened in January, 1875 by Sir Philip Wodehouse, Governor of Bombay. Following India's independence in 1947, the school was renamed the "Mohandas Gandhi High School" in honour of Gandhi.

=== Mohandas Gandhi ===
Mahatma Gandhi graduated from Rajkot High School in 1887 at age 18. Accounts vary on Gandhi's time at the school. Several accounts suggest he was a quiet and academically unremarkable student who did not participate in sports or extracurricular activities. Gandhi said of his schooling, "I had not any high regard for my ability. I was to be astonished whenever I won prizes and scholarships". However, Rajmohan Gandhi suggests that this view comes from a misreading of his "self-deprecating" autobiography. Out of 38 students who had passed the high school entrance examination, Gandhi was one of only two students in his year to matriculate. Following graduation Gandhi enrolled at the Samaldas College in Bhavnagar, where he stayed for one term before travelling to London.

== Museum ==
Mahatma Gandhi Museum
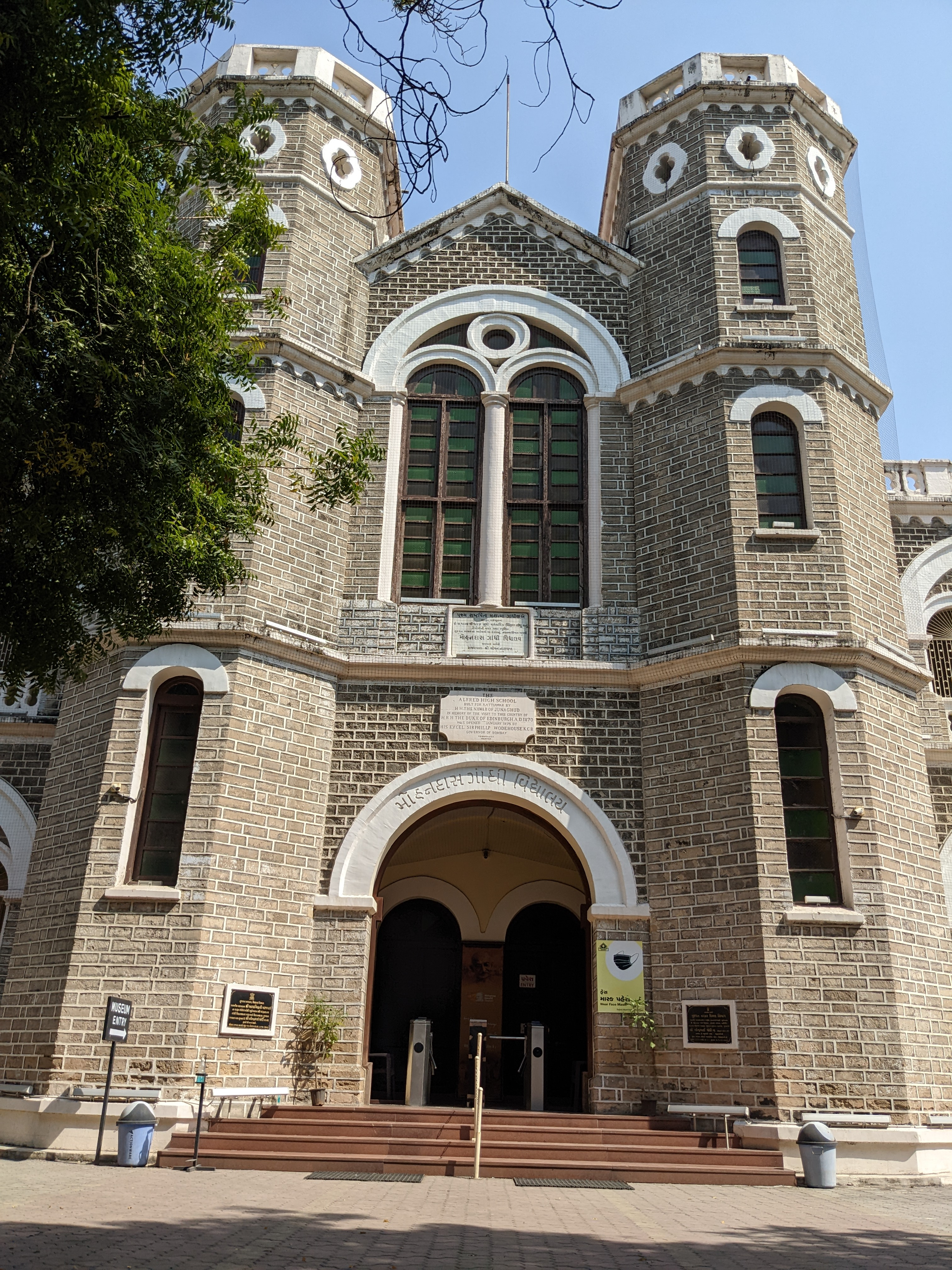
- Renovated into museum
- Former name: Alfred High School
- Established: 30 September 2018
- Coordinates: 22.298546°N 70.802102°E
- Type: Biographical museum
- Owners: Rajkot municipal corporation, Gujarat Tourism
- Website: https://www.mgmrajkot.com/

=== History ===
In 2017, the school was closed and announced that it will be converted into museum. Due to the less student count around 100 where hardly one third attended the school regularly (out of 100). Subsequently the Rajkot municipal corporation decided to close down the school and convert it into a museum so the youngsters can learn about the events that shaped Gandhi's life and shaped India's freedom struggle.

The project was finished at the approx cost of ₹26 crores (₹260 millions).

On 30 September 2018, then Hon. Prime Minister of India Shree Narendra Modi along with Chief Minister of Gujarat Shree Vijay Rupani and Deputy Chief Minister Shree Nitin Patel inaugurated the museum as celebration of 150th birth anniversary of Gandhiji. The museum is operated jointly by Rajkot Municipal Corporation (RMC) and Gujarat Tourism.

=== Features ===
The museum has repurposed school rooms into galleries totaling at 39. Visitor navigate sequentially through each gallery where dedicated narrator guides and depicts briefly. Ground floor has 18 & top floor consists of 21 such galleries.

Galleries are equipped with modern technology including air-conditioned rooms, sensor-aware models, projectors with audio speakers, touch screen kiosks with headphones, 3D models and different lighting. Light and sound show is regular occurrence after sunset, making it more attractive to children. Along with galleries museum also has following amenities:

- Museum guide
- Ticket counter & Cloakroom
- Helpdesk
- Library
- Children Area
- ATM
- Parking
- Toilet
- Garden
- Food Court

=== 3D Projection Mapping Show ===
The Mahatma Gandhi Museum also features a 3D Projection Mapping Show that narrates the life, values, and message of Mahatma Gandhi. The show uses advanced 3D building-mapping projection technology combined with laser projection, synchronized sound, and light effects to create an immersive visual experience for visitors.

== See also ==
- The Rajkumar College
- Watson Museum
