= Lakhajirajsinhji II Bavajirajsinhji =

Lakhajirajsinhji II
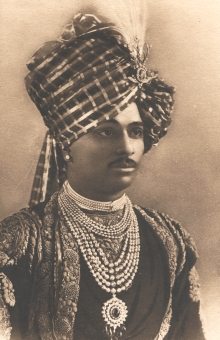

Thakore Saheb of Rajkot
- Reign: 16 April 1890 – 2 February 1930
- Investititure: 21 October 1907
- Predecessor: Bawajirajsinhji Meramansinhji
- Successor: Dharmendrasinhji Lakhajirajsinhji
- Born: 17 December 1885; Rajkot, India
- Died: 2 February 1930 (aged 44); Ranjit Villas Palace, Rajkot, India
- Spouse: 11 wives, notably Hajubakunverb
- Issue: Bhupendrasinhji; Dharmendrasinhji; Kishorsinhji; Pradyumansinhji
- Father: Bawajirajsinhji Meramansinhji
- Mother: Anandkunverba of Dharampur

Lakhajirajsinhji II (17 December 1885 – 2 February 1930) was the Rajput or kshatriya ruler of the Indian princely state of Rajkot from April 1890 until his death, holding the title Thakore Saheb. He came to the throne at the age of four, following the death of his father and his three older brothers. However, he did not govern in his own right until the age of 21, in 1907. Lakhajirajsinhji became one of the most progressive princely state rulers, introducing some of the first democratic institutions in India. He also fostered a culture of openness and intellectualism that laid the foundation for Rajkot as a centre of the Indian independence movement.

== Early life and family ==
Lakhajirajsinhji was born to a Rajput family in Rajkot on 17 December 1885. His father, Bavajirajsinhji, had succeeded to the throne of Rajkot in 1862, aged six, upon the death of his own father, Meramanji IV. Rajkot State, comprising various territories in the interior of Gujarat's Kathiawar peninsula, had been founded in 1611 by Vibhoji (or Vibhaji), a member of the Jadeja clan and a grandson of Sataji, a 16th-century Jam of Nawanagar. Vibhoji had been granted the sanad (authority) to rule the pargana of Sardhar by Jahangir, a Mughal emperor. Although Rajkot was at one time occupied by a force led by a Mughal subedar, the rulers of Rajkot were generally able to maintain their independence. However, from 1808, Rajkot (and most other Kathiawar states) paid tribute to the Gaekwad rulers of Baroda, under the terms of a settlement arranged by Colonel Alexander Walker, the British resident in Baroda. The Walker Settlement largely brought peace to western Gujarat, and in 1820 the British leased land in Rajkot for the purpose of establishing a cantonment.

The British, succeeding the Mughals as paramount power, leased a further 385 acres (1.56 km^{2}) from Rajkot in 1863, allowed by Naniba, Bavajirajsinhji's grandmother and regent. However, under the terms of the Minority Administration Act, Naniba was soon removed as regent and replaced by a British-appointed administrator. Rajkot, as the headquarters of the Kathiawar Agency, was often the subject of British attention, and its ruler was consequently granted a nine-gun salute, despite its small size. Its importance was further enhanced in 1870 by the establishment of the Rajkumar College, which was attended by many of the Kathiawar rulers' sons. Bavajirajsinhji, who was one of the first to attend the college, was formally invested with the full powers of the gadi in 1876. Appreciated by the British for his "careful and energetic administration", he implemented a number of significant reforms, including the devolution of some of his powers to municipal governments. Bavajirajsinhji married eleven times, producing five sons and two daughters. Lakhajirajsinhji, the fourth son, was born to Thakurani Anand Kunverba, who was the oldest daughter of Narandevji II, the Raja of Dharampur in southern Gujarat. His three older brothers each died in childhood, making him the heir apparent, and his younger brother, Karasinhji, also died young.

== Education and sporting career ==
Lakhajirajsinhji II Bavajirajsinhji
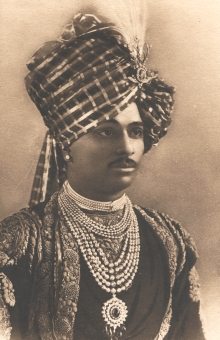

Personal information
- Batting: Right-handed
- Bowling: Right-arm fast
- Relatives: Ranjitsinhji (uncle); Pradyumansinhji (son); Manoharsinhji (grandson)

Career statistics
Competition	First-class
Matches	3
Runs scored	41
Batting average	6.83
100s/50s	0/0
Top score	14
Balls bowled	234
Wickets	4
Bowling average	46.75
5 wickets in innings	0
10 wickets in match	0
Best bowling	3/77
Catches/stumpings	2/–
- Source: CricketArchive, 12 December 2012

During his early childhood, Lakhajirajsinhji lived in Dharampur with his maternal uncle, Baldevji. He was very close to his uncle and aunt, and also to their daughter, Lal, who was later married to Hari Singh, the future Maharaja of Jammu and Kashmir. Her death during pregnancy in 1915 reputedly affected him so much that he retracted an earlier proposal to fight with the British Indian Army in Europe. Like his father, Lakhajirajsinhji attended the Rajkumar College in Rajkot. His younger brother, Karasinhji, also attended the school at the same time, and their close relationship, unusual among members of royal families, was noted by the college's principal. Regarded well by both his teachers and his peers, Lakhajirajsinhji was a keen participant in school sports, excelling at tennis, polo, athletics, and the equestrian discipline tent-pegging, for which he was awarded a prize by the Governor of Bombay, Lord Northcote. His preferred sport, however, was cricket, and he captained his school against several other similar Kathiawar institutions. In 1904, during his final season as a student at the college, he reputedly won several matches with his "dashing" bowling, with his highest score of 93 runs made against a Wadhwan high school. He also excelled academically, and in his penultimate year was the only student to pass all his classes.

Lakhajirajsinhji left the Rajkumar College in 1905 for the Imperial Cadet Corps in Dehra Dun, a predecessor of the present Rashtriya Indian Military College and National Defence Academy. During his two years at the Imperial Cadet Corps, which trained the sons of both native rulers and Anglo-Indians, Lakhajirajsinhji was again highly regarded. He graduated in March 1907. During this time, Lakhajirajsinhji maintained his interest in cricket, becoming a patron of the game as well as playing. He visited England several times, and during a 1908 visit played a game for the Gentlemen of England against Oxford University, which was accorded first-class status. In an attempt to anglicise his name, the Wisden Cricketers' Almanack recorded him as "Prince Chakorsab". Lakhajirajsinhji would play two further first-class matches: one in 1912, for Hindus in the Bombay Quadrangular, and one in 1922, captaining a combined Hindus and Muslims side against a combined Europeans and Parsees side. The latter match was his most successful, and included the first three wickets of his opponents' first innings, on the way to career-best figures of 3/77.

== Reign ==
Lakhajirajsinhji was invested with the full powers of the gadi in October 1907, at a ceremony in Rajkot conducted by the British resident, Percy Fitzgerald. Fitzgerald had also conducted the installation of Jam Sahib Ranjitsinhji on the gadi of Nawanagar earlier in the year, Ranjitsinhji being another keen cricketer. A conflict arose between Fitzgerald and Lakhajirajsinhji as to the time of the investiture ceremony. Fitzgerald wished to hold the ceremony at 8:30 a.m., so as to beat the heat, but Lakhajirajsinhji had been informed by his astrologers that the optimum time for the ceremony was at 9 o'clock. Fitzgerald appeared to have won out, but on the morning of the ceremony, according to an anecdote, Ranjitsinhji, who had been staying with Fitzgerald at the Thakore Saheb's official residence and was to travel in the same carriage, deliberately delayed his morning ablutions so that their carriage arrived half an hour late.

Like his father, Lakhajirajsinhji was considered a progressive ruler, which was encouraged by the British administration of the time. He was in attendance at the Delhi Durbar in 1911, which marked the coronation of George V, Emperor of India, and was made a Knight Commander of the Order of the Indian Empire in June 1918. Encouraging the development of public debate and intellectualism within Rajkot, Lakhajirasinhji established a State Council and State Bank in 1910, as well as a Peoples' Assembly in 1923. He died at the Ranjit Villas Palace in February 1930, and was succeeded firstly by his oldest son, Dharmendrasinhji (1910–1940), and then by his third son, Pradyumansinhji. Both Pradyumansinhji and his son, Manoharsinhji, also played first-class cricket.

== Titles ==
- 17 December 1885 – 16 April 1890: Kumar Lakhajirajsinhji, Yuvraj Saheb of Rajkot
- 16 April 1890 – 3 June 1918: His Highness Thakore Saheb Lakhajirajsinhji II Bavajirajsinhji, 12th Thakore Saheb of Rajkot
- 3 June 1918 – 2 February 1930: His Highness Thakore Saheb Sir Lakhajirajsinhji II Bavajirajsinhji, 12th Thakore Saheb of Rajkot, KCIE

Regnal titles
Preceded by Bavajirajsinhji	12th Thakore Saheb of Rajkot; 1890–1930	Succeeded by Dharmendrasinhji
