= Elakshiben Thakore =

Indian dancer

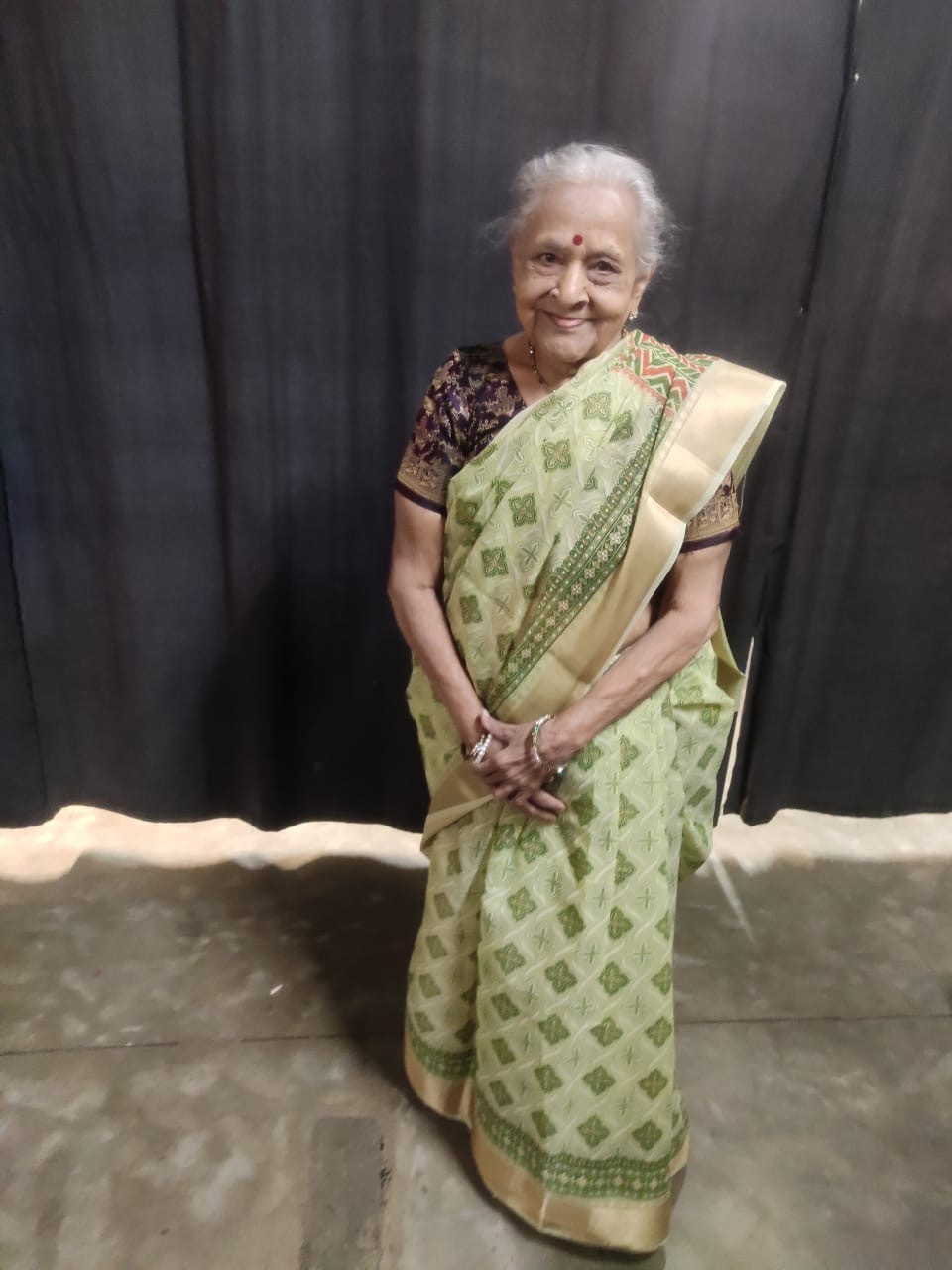
- Elakshiben Thakore at an event
- Born: 21 April 1936 (age 90); Pune, India
- Education: M.Mus, Specialization in Bharatnatyam, with Theory on Dances of the World
- Occupations: Founder and Director, Nrityabharti Academy of Dance; Dancer; choreographer
- Years active: 1960–present
- Known for: Bharatnatyam and Choreography
- Website: Webpage

Kalaguru Smt. Elakshiben Thakore (born 21 April 1936) is one of the leading Bharatnatyam dancers in India. Trained from a very young age in the pristine purity of this traditional dance style, she showed a new pathway to the Gujarati artists by choreographing the dance compositions on Gujarati and Hindi poems.

== Early life ==
Elakshiben started dancing at the age of 18. She did her B.Mus and M.Mus from Maharaja Sayajirao University of Baroda.

== Career ==
Elakshiben founded Nrityabharti Academy of Dance at Ahmedabad in 1960. Bharatnatyam, Tamil Nadu based classical dance (which was not so familiar dance form in late fifties and early sixties in Gujarat) became popular after her special efforts in compositions with Gujarati and Hindi poems. She adopted poems from literature and composed a full Bharatnatyam Margam which brought rightful applauds, high acclaims and appreciation from press, critics and viewers. Till now, she has composed round about 200 dance recitals on Gujarati and Hindi literature, most notably poems from Mirabai, Tulsidas, Narsinh Mehta, Nanalal Dalpatram Kavi, Premanand Bhatt, Sarojini Naidu.

She served as a member of Sangeet Nritya Natya Academy of Gujarat from 1975 to 1995. She was appointed on the advisory board in Doordarshan Kendra, Ahmedabad between 1992-1995 and re-appointed between 2000 and 2008. She served as an advisor and expert for the dance at Akhil Bharatiya Gandharva Mahavidyalaya Mandal - Miraj and Bruhad Gujarat Sangeet Samittee. She also served as an examiner in dance for Maharaja Sayajirao University of Baroda and University of Vallabh Vidhyanagar. She had been a member of the Expert Committee of dance in Gujarat University.

She conducted heritage summer camps at Stroudsburg, Pennsylvania between 1984 and 1990

She worked in Gujarat State Sangeet Natak Academy for several years and also contributed to drama by participating or leading in several Gujarati theatre plays, most notably Dharagurjari, Ghela nu Gaam, Idariyo Garh Jitya, Muzaffar Shah, Shetal ne Kaanthe, Hoholika, Bhagwad-ajukiyam.

== Personal life ==
Elakshiben married late Arun Thakore, a veteran theatre personality, freedom fighter and founder of Rangmandal, Ahmedabad. Elakshiben and her son Chandan are currently running the dance academy at their Ahmedabad residence.

== Awards and honours ==
List of honours & awards

- 1979 - Awarded by Triveni, a leading cultural organisation of Baroda, for her contribution in classical dances
- 1981 - Gaurav Puraskar, presented by Minister Shri Manoharsinhji Jadeja
- 1982 - Awarded by "Amruta" of Bombay for her creative work in Bharatnatyam
- 1999 - Potluri Award from USA Tennessee in recognition of her 40 years of outstanding services to Indian classical dance by "Abhinaya" institute of Dance, Mumbai
- 2002 - Nritya Yatra Award for her golden 50 years of dedicated services to the field of dance.
- 2006 - Ahmedabad Municipal Corporation Award
- 2015 - Honoured by President of India, Pranab Mukherjee on 17 October 2015 in Indradhanush programme.
