= Rajkot =

- Metropolis
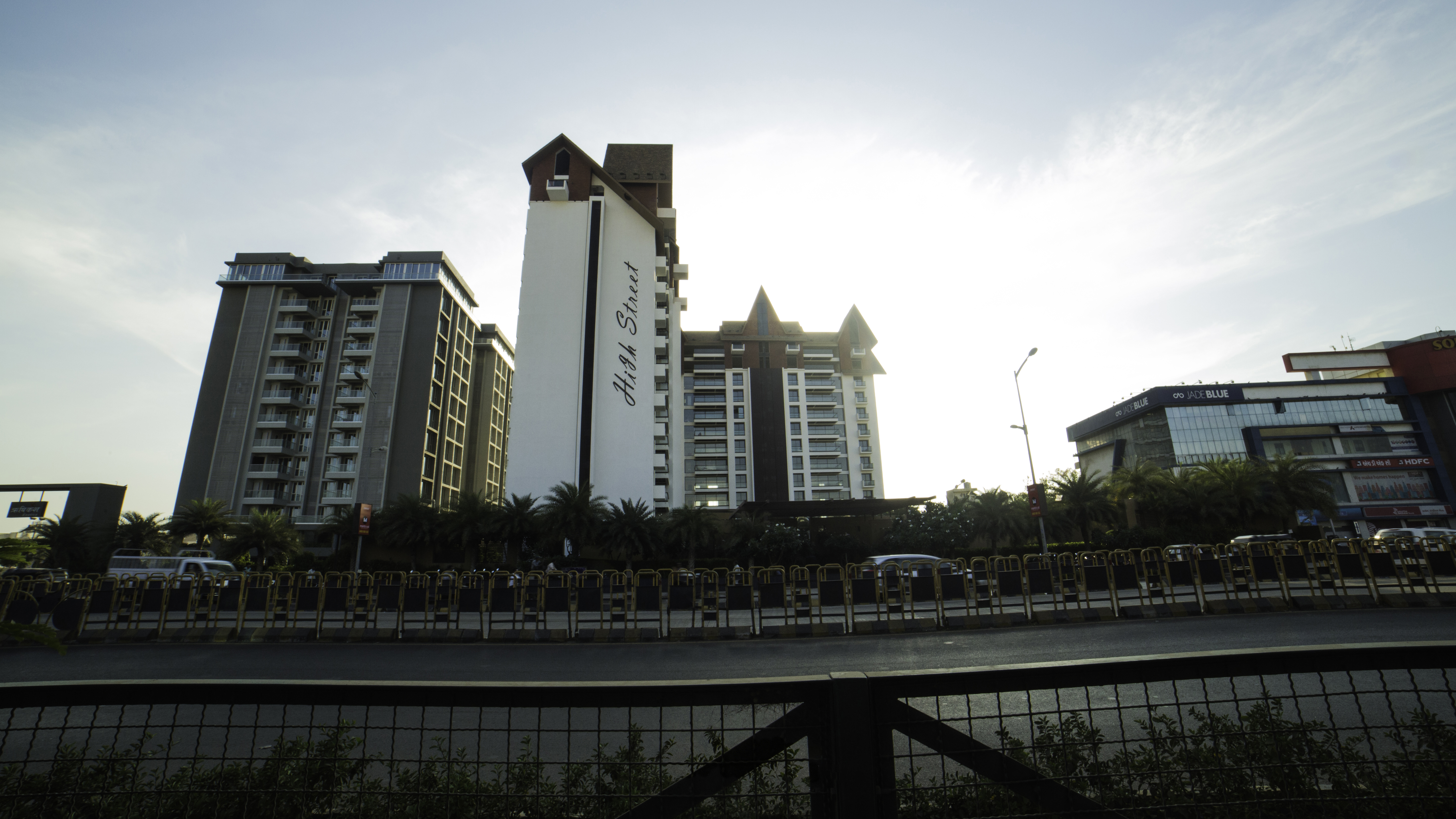
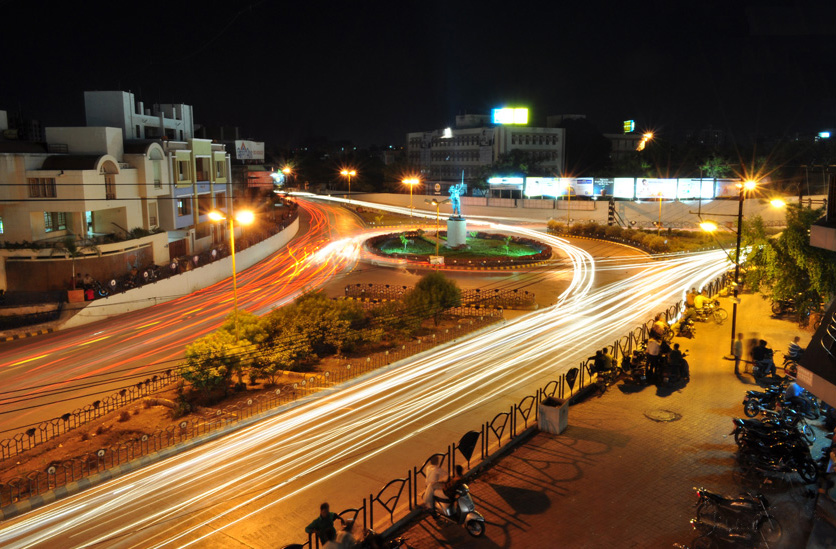
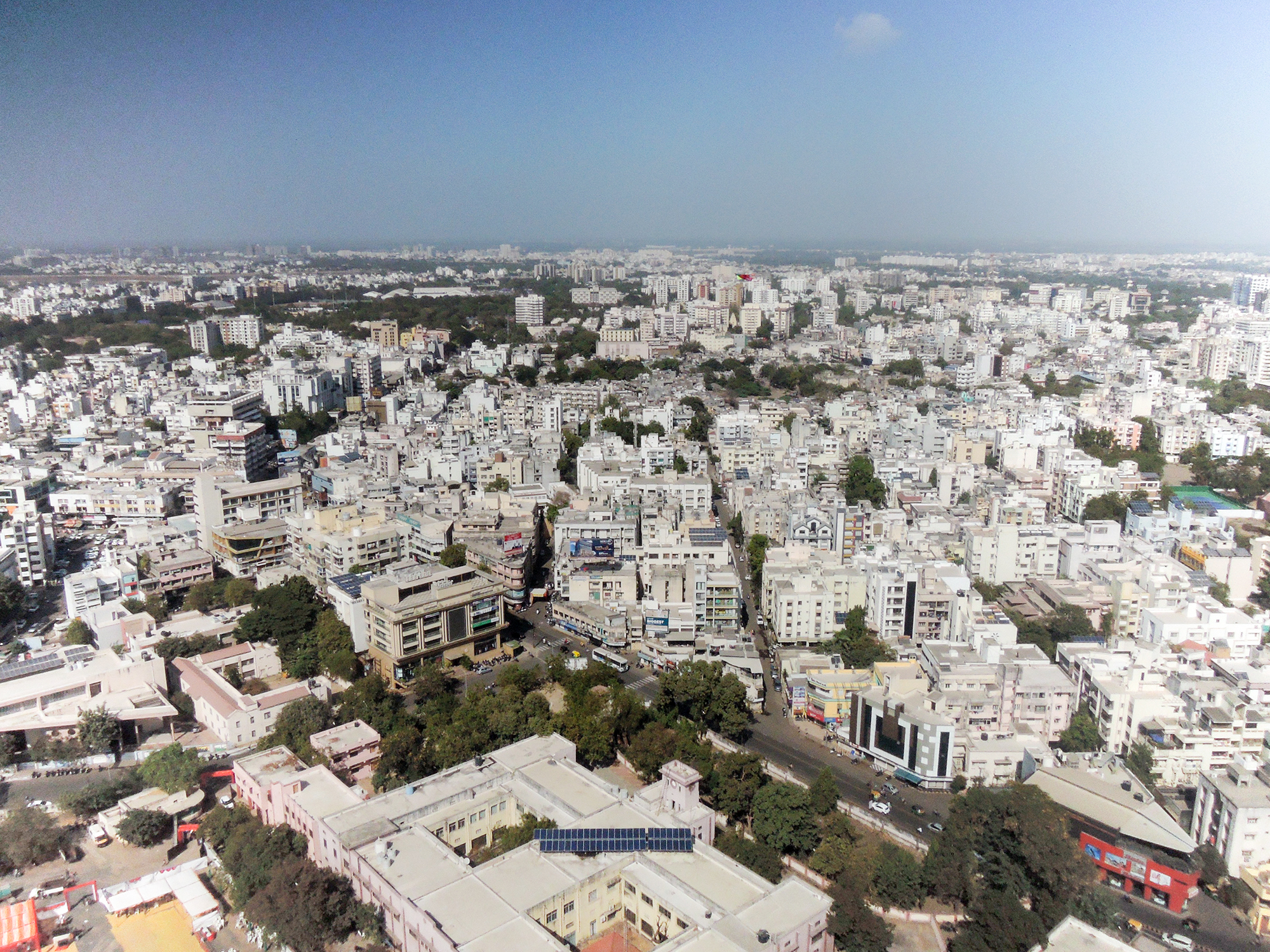
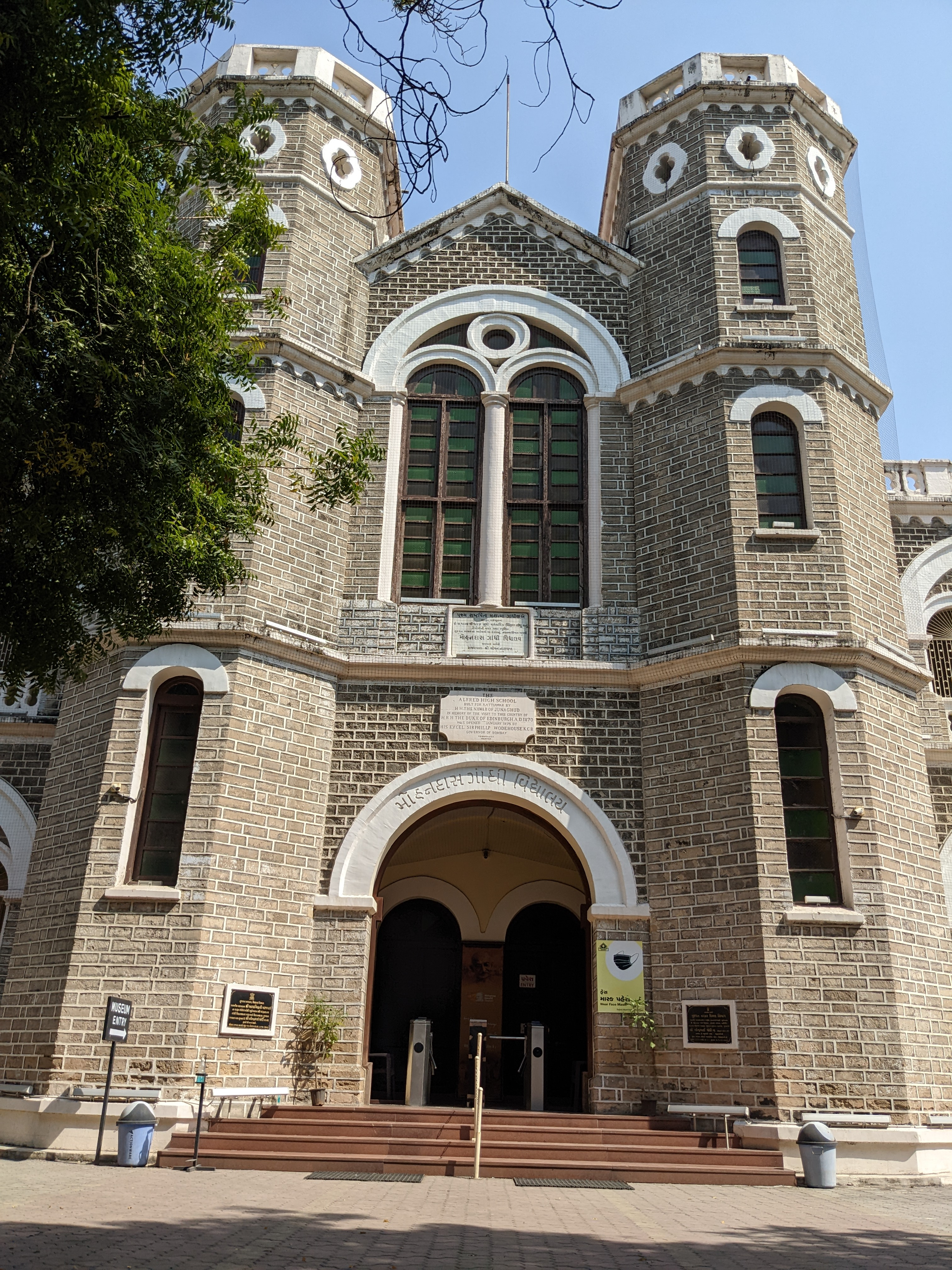
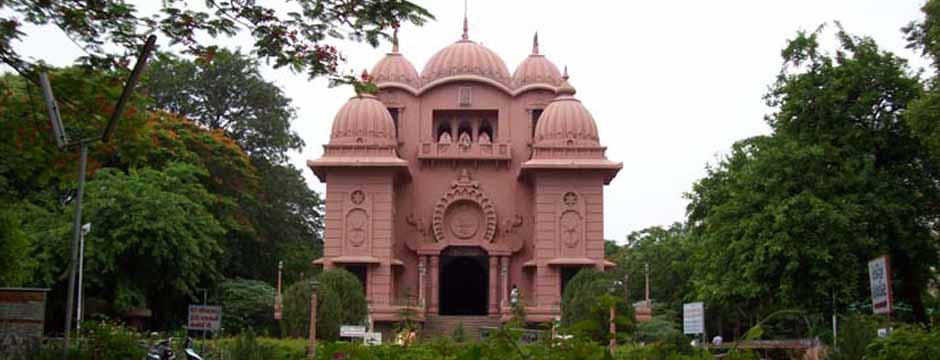
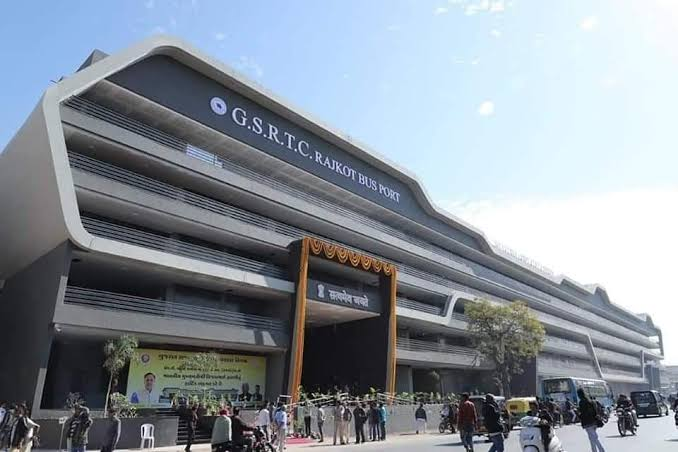
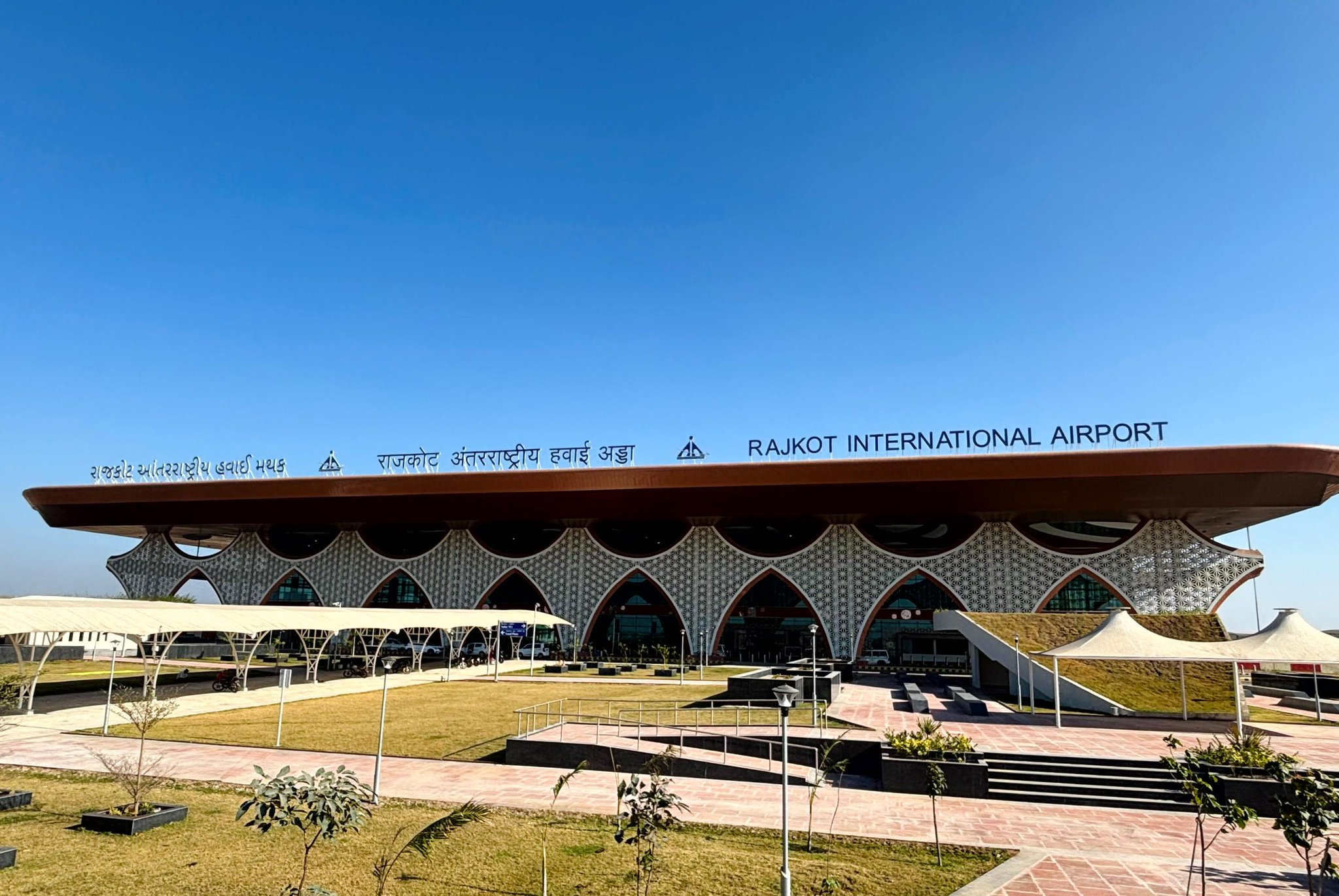
- Skyline of Rajkot Swaminarayan Temple CDS Bipin Rawat Underbridge Rajkot Aerial View Gandhi Museum Shri Ramakrishna Ashram Rajkot Central Bus Port Rajkot International Airport

- Seal of the Rajkot Municipal Corporation

- Location within Gujarat
- Coordinates: 22.3000°N 70.7833°E
- Country: India
- State: Gujarat
- Region: Saurashtra
- District: Rajkot
- Established: 1612; 414 years ago
- Founder: Vibhoji Ajoji Jadeja

Government
  - Type: Municipal Corporation
  - Body: Rajkot Municipal Corporation
  - Mayor: Nehal Shukla (BJP)
  - Deputy Mayor: Daxaben Vasani

Area
  - Metropolis: 170 km^{2} (66 sq mi)
- Elevation: 134.42 m (441.0 ft)

Population (2021)
  - Metropolis: 2,000,000
  - Rank: 28th 4th (in Gujarat state)
  - Density: 12,000/km^{2} (30,000/sq mi)
  - Metro: 2.45 million
  - Metro rank: 35th
- Demonym: Rajkotian
- Time zone: UTC+5:30 (IST)
- PIN: 3600XX
- Telephone code: 0281
- Vehicle registration: GJ-03
- Literacy: 87.80 (2016)%
- Urban planning agency: RUDA
- Climate: Semi-Arid (Köppen)
- Website: www.rmc.gov.in

Rajkot (Hindi: [ˈraːdʒkoːʈ]) is the fourth-largest city in the western Indian state of Gujarat, after Ahmedabad, Surat, and Vadodara. It is in the centre of the Saurashtra region of Gujarat. Rajkot is the 35th-largest metropolitan area in India, with a population of more than 2 million as of 2021. Rajkot is the 6th cleanest city of India, and it is the 22nd fastest-growing city in the world as of March 2021. It is located on the banks of the Aji and Nyari rivers. Rajkot was the capital of the Saurashtra State from 15 April 1948 to 31 October 1956, before its merger with Bombay State on 1 November 1956. Rajkot was reincorporated into Gujarat State on 1 May 1960.

== History ==
The name "Rajkot" is derived from two words: "Raj", meaning "king" or "royalty", and "Kot", meaning "fort"—thus, Rajkot translates to "King's Fort". The city was founded in 1612 by Thakur Sahib Vibhoji Ajoji Jadeja, a member of the Jadeja Rajput clan and grandson of Jam Sataji of Nawanagar State (present-day Jamnagar). Vibhoji received the territory as a jagir (land grant) and established Rajkot as the capital of his princely state. Over time, Rajkot developed into an important administrative and cultural center in the Saurashtra region.

Under British rule, Rajkot served as the headquarters of the Kathiawar Agency and later as the capital of the Western India States Agency (WISA). The princely Rajkot state acceded to the Indian Union in 1948, following India’s independence in 1947.

It has had a long history and had a significant influence in the Indian independence movement. Rajkot was home to many personalities like Mahatma Gandhi. Rajkot is in a transition period of growing cultural, industrial, and economical activities. Rajkot is the 26th largest city in India and the 22nd fastest-growing urban area in the world.

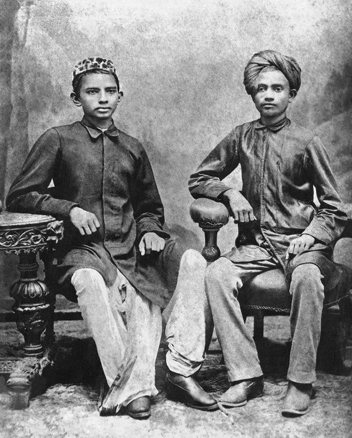
Young Mahatma Gandhi (left) and his school friend Sheikh Mehtab (right) in Rajkot

Rajkot was the capital of Saurashtra state from 15 April 1948 to 31 October 1956 before merging in bilingual Bombay State on 1 November 1956. Rajkot was merged into Gujarat State from bilingual Bombay state on 1 May 1960. Thakur Saheb Pradyumansinhji died in 1973. His son, Manoharsinhji Pradyumansinhji, has carved out a political career at the provincial level, succeeded him. He served as a Member of the Gujarat Legislative Assembly for several years and as the state Minister for Health and Finance. Monoharsinhji's son, Mandattasinh Jadeja has embarked on a business career.

On 26 January 2001, the 7.7M_{w} Gujarat earthquake shook Western India with a maximum Mercalli intensity of X (Extreme), leaving 13,805–20,023 dead and about 166,800 injured. This earthquake mainly affected the Kutch region of western Gujarat.

== Geography ==
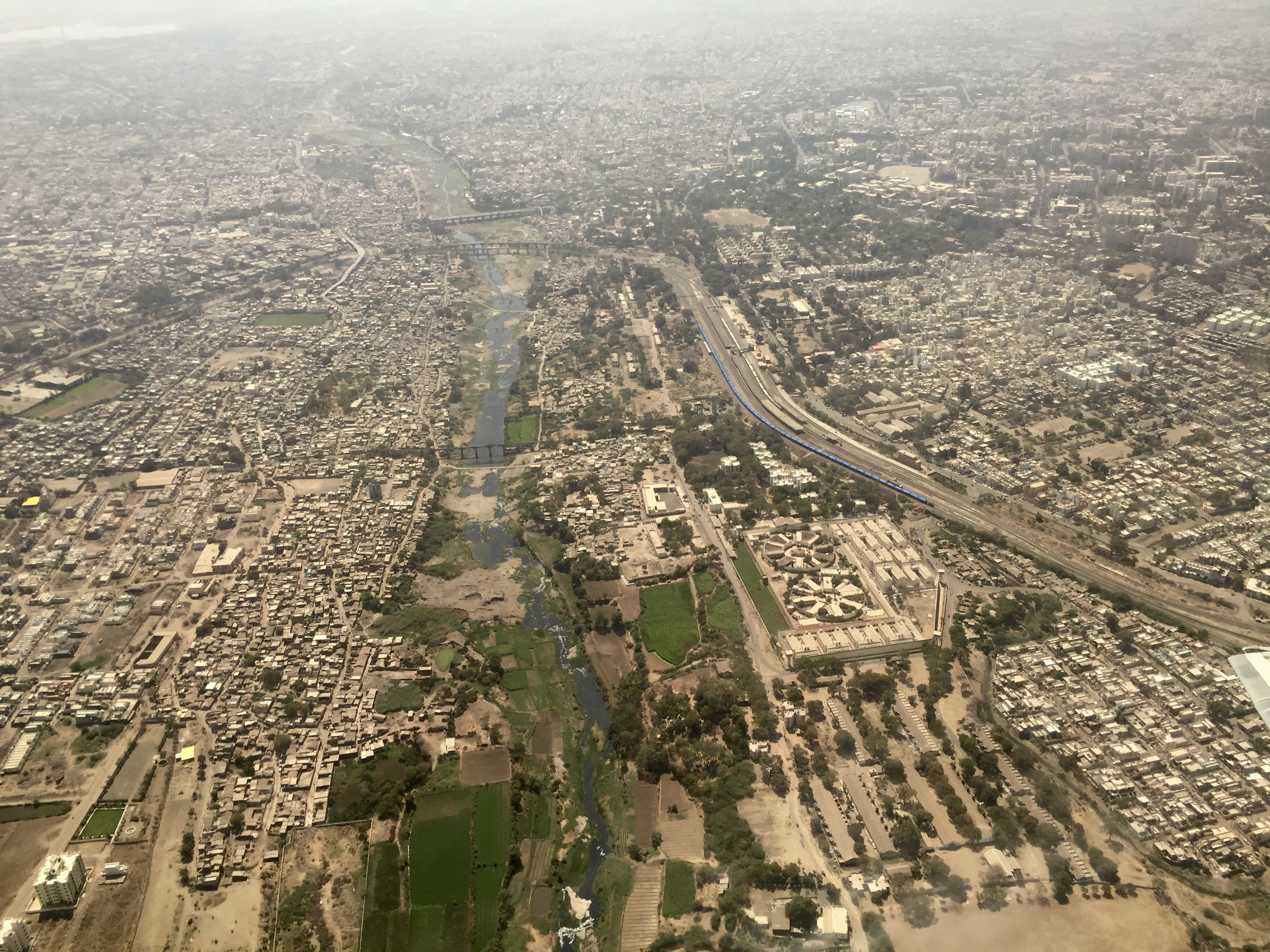
An aerial image of the Aji River that flows through the city of Rajkot

Rajkot is located at 22.3°N 70.78°E. It has an average elevation of 128 metres (420 ft). The city is located on the bank of Aji River and Nyari River which remains dry except the monsoon months of July to September. The city is spread in the area of 170.00 km^{2}.

Rajkot is situated in the region called Saurashtra in the Gujarat state of India. The significance of Rajkot's location is that it is one of the prime industrial centres of Gujarat. Rajkot has a central location in the area called the Kathiawar peninsula. The city is located within the Rajkot district in Gujarat. Rajkot city is the administrative headquarters of the district of Rajkot. The district is surrounded by Botad in the east, and Surendranagar in the north, Junagadh and Amreli in the south, Morbi in the northwest and Jamnagar in the west and Porbandar in the southwest.

=== Climate ===
Rajkot has a hot semi-arid climate (Köppen BSh), with hot, dry summers from mid-March to mid-June and the wet monsoon season from mid-June to October, when the city receives 670 millimetres or 26 inches of rain on average. However, this rainfall varies greatly from year to year – for instance less than 160 millimetres or 6.3 inches fell in 1911 and 1939 but more than 1,300 millimetres or 51 inches in 1878 and over 1,450 millimetres or 57 inches in the incomplete year of 1959. The months from November to February are mild, the average temperature being around 20 °C or 68 °F, with low humidity.

One of the most important weather phenomena that is associated with the city of Rajkot is the cyclone. The cyclones generally occur in the Arabian Sea during the months after the rainy season. The region experiences a lot of rainfall and high-speed winds during the time of the year after the monsoon season as well as the months of May and June. However, June experiences lesser amount of rainfall and winds than the post-monsoon time. Thunderstorms are another important part of the Rajkot weather in the months of June and July. During summer time, the temperature ranges between 24 and 42 °C (75.2 and 107.6 °F). In the months of winter, Rajkot temperature varies between 10 and 22 °C (50.0 and 71.6 °F) but on a whole winters are pleasant.

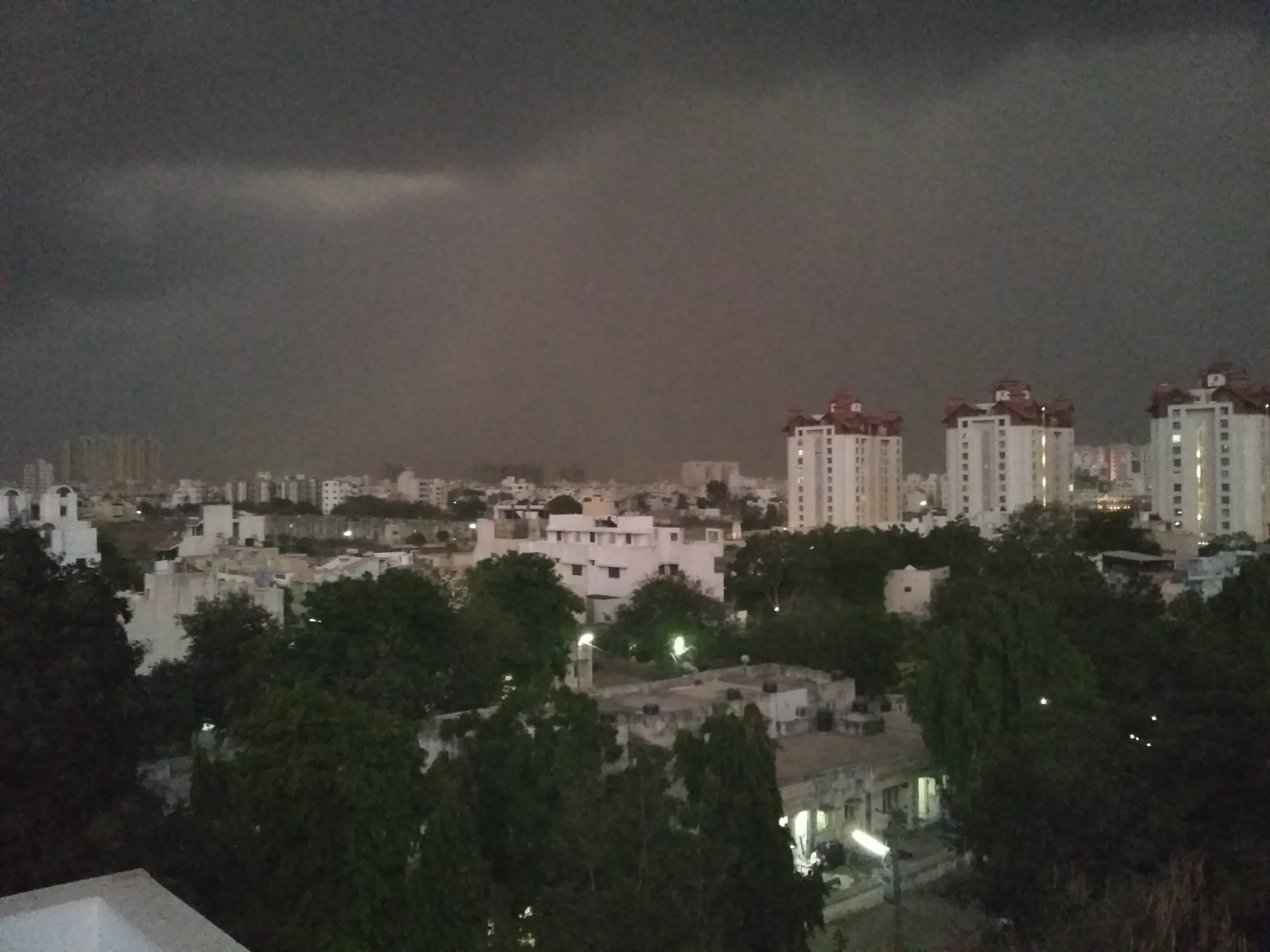
Rajkot's skyline in cloudy weather

Climate data for Rajkot Airport (1991–2020, extremes 1952–present)
| Month | Jan | Feb | Mar | Apr | May | Jun | Jul | Aug | Sep | Oct | Nov | Dec | Year |
|---|---|---|---|---|---|---|---|---|---|---|---|---|---|
| Record high °C (°F) | 36.4 (97.5) | 40.0 (104.0) | 43.9 (111.0) | 44.8 (112.6) | 47.9 (118.2) | 45.8 (114.4) | 40.6 (105.1) | 38.8 (101.8) | 42.8 (109.0) | 41.9 (107.4) | 39.8 (103.6) | 37.6 (99.7) | 47.9 (118.2) |
| Mean daily maximum °C (°F) | 28.6 (83.5) | 31.4 (88.5) | 36.0 (96.8) | 39.6 (103.3) | 41.0 (105.8) | 38.1 (100.6) | 33.0 (91.4) | 31.7 (89.1) | 33.4 (92.1) | 36.0 (96.8) | 33.6 (92.5) | 30.3 (86.5) | 34.4 (93.9) |
| Daily mean °C (°F) | 20.6 (69.1) | 23.4 (74.1) | 27.7 (81.9) | 31.2 (88.2) | 33.2 (91.8) | 31.9 (89.4) | 28.9 (84.0) | 28.0 (82.4) | 28.6 (83.5) | 29.3 (84.7) | 26.0 (78.8) | 22.3 (72.1) | 27.6 (81.7) |
| Mean daily minimum °C (°F) | 12.7 (54.9) | 15.3 (59.5) | 19.5 (67.1) | 23.0 (73.4) | 25.7 (78.3) | 26.6 (79.9) | 25.4 (77.7) | 24.5 (76.1) | 23.9 (75.0) | 22.6 (72.7) | 18.6 (65.5) | 14.3 (57.7) | 21.1 (70.0) |
| Record low °C (°F) | −0.6 (30.9) | 1.1 (34.0) | 6.1 (43.0) | 10.0 (50.0) | 16.1 (61.0) | 20.0 (68.0) | 19.4 (66.9) | 20.1 (68.2) | 16.7 (62.1) | 12.2 (54.0) | 7.2 (45.0) | 2.8 (37.0) | −0.6 (30.9) |
| Average rainfall mm (inches) | 0.7 (0.03) | 0.1 (0.00) | 0.1 (0.00) | 1.3 (0.05) | 3.8 (0.15) | 130.0 (5.12) | 293.3 (11.55) | 195.2 (7.69) | 125.1 (4.93) | 23.7 (0.93) | 2.7 (0.11) | 0.2 (0.01) | 776.3 (30.56) |
| Average rainy days | 0.1 | 0.0 | 0.0 | 0.3 | 0.3 | 4.6 | 10.3 | 8.5 | 5.4 | 1.3 | 0.2 | 0.0 | 31.0 |
| Average relative humidity (%) (at 17:30 IST) | 29 | 25 | 19 | 19 | 28 | 50 | 71 | 71 | 60 | 35 | 30 | 30 | 39 |
Source 1: India Meteorological Department
Source 2: Tokyo Climate Center (mean temperatures 1991–2020)

Rajkot has been ranked 14th best “National Clean Air City” (under Category 1 >10L Population cities) in India according to 'Swachh Vayu Survekshan 2024 Results'

== Demographics ==
Religions in Rajkot M Corp. (2011)
| Hinduism | 89.90% |
| Islam | 7.68% |
| Jainism | 1.90% |
| Other or not stated | 0.20% |
Distribution of religions

Historical population
| Year | Pop. | ±% |
|---|---|---|
| 1891 | 29,200 | — |
| 1941 | 66,400 | +127.4% |
| 1951 | 132,100 | +98.9% |
| 1961 | 193,500 | +46.5% |
| 1968 | 270,800 | +39.9% |
| 1971 | 302,000 | +11.5% |
| 1981 | 444,200 | +47.1% |
| 1991 | 654,500 | +47.3% |
| 2001 | 1,003,015 | +53.2% |
| 2011 | 1,390,640 | +38.6% |
| 2013 | 1,560,000 | +12.2% |

As of the 2011 Census of India, Rajkot recorded a total population of 1,390,640. Rajkot city has an average literacy rate of 82.20%, higher than the national average. The population is 52.43% male and 47.47% female. Most of the population is Hindu with a Muslim and Jain minority.

Hinduism was the main religion, practiced by 89.90% of the population. Islam was the second-largest religion (7.68%). Jains were 1.90%.

Languages of Rajkot M Corp. (2011)
1. Gujarati (94.6%)
2. Hindi (2.71%)
3. Others (2.69%)

At the time of the 2011 census, 94.60% of the population spoke Gujarati and 2.71% Hindi as their first language.

== Culture ==
As with large parts of Gujarat, the people of Rajkot are primarily vegetarian.

Rajkot is multicultural. One can find many languages, like Gujarati, Hindi, Urdu, English, Sindhi, Bengali, Tamil, Malayalam and Marathi. However, only Gujarati, Hindi, Urdu, and English are well understood. Rajkot is the part of Kathiyawad. Because of this, people of Rajkot are also known as Kathiyawadi.

Rajkot is frequently referred to as Rangilu Rajkot (રંગીલુ રાજકોટ), meaning "Colourful Rajkot". Rajkot is also called as "Chitranagri" (City of Paintings).

=== Landmarks ===
Swaminarayan temple

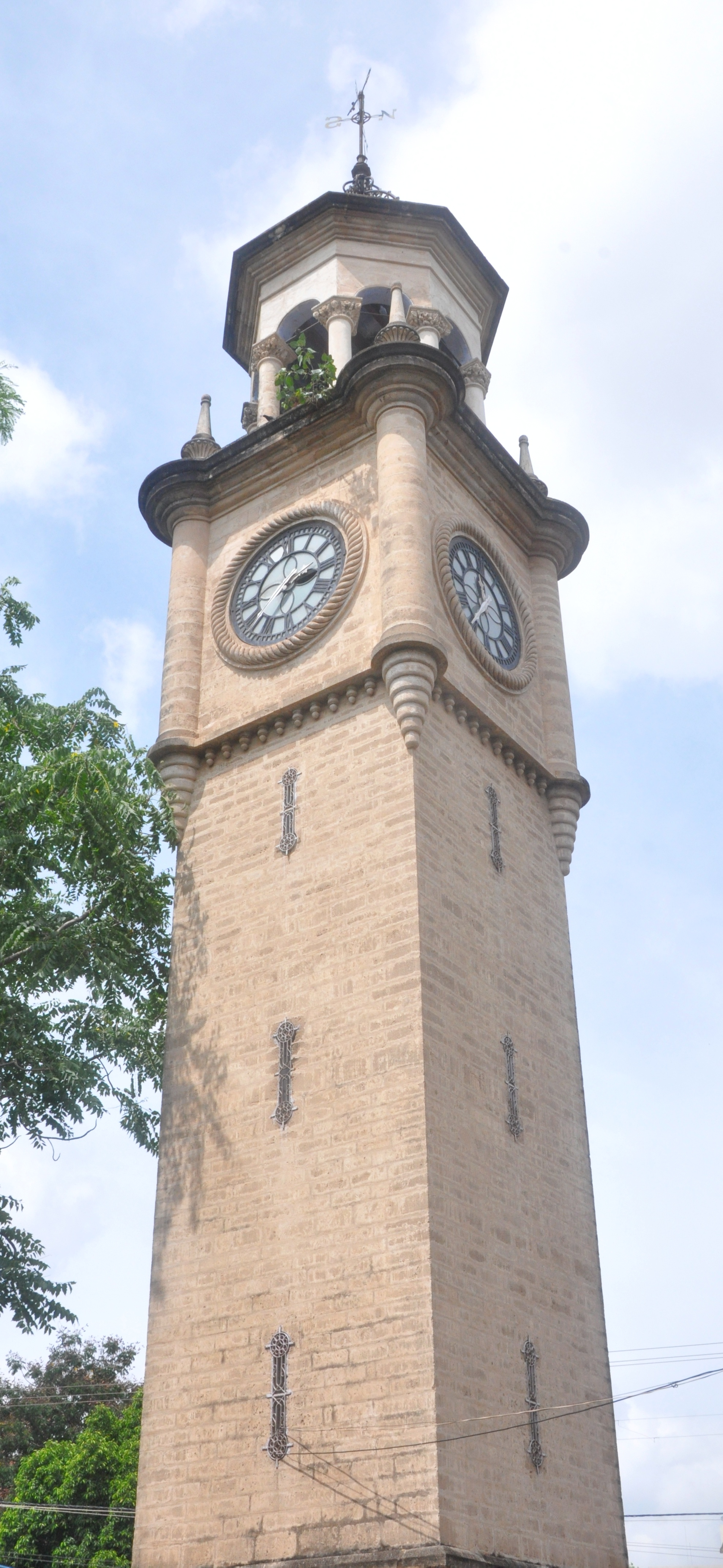
Jam Tower

Rajkot has many historical landmarks. The Jubilee Garden is a large, open park in the centre of the city featuring many monuments from colonial times. Located prominently in the centre of the garden is the Connaught Hall. Other notable points of interest near the garden include the historic Mohandas Gandhi High School (Now Mahatma Gandhi Museum), Kaba Gandhi No Delo (Mohandas Gandhi's childhood residence), Rashtriya Shala, Watson Museum, Rotary Dolls Museum, Lang Library, Rotary Midtown Library and Niranjan Shah Stadium (originally Khanderi Stadium).

The Rotary Dolls Museum has a collection of more than 1,400 dolls from all over the world. This museum is being managed by Rotary Club of Rajkot Midtown along with Rajkot Nagrik Sahakari Bank. The Museum has earned a place in Limca Book of Records for its unique collection of dolls.

The Trimandir, a non-sectarian temple founded by Dada Bhagwan, is located at a short distance from the city.

=== Awards ===
Best LAW and Order city – 2013, Best Housing & Transport City- 2015, Safe City Award for Rajkot Eye-Way Project 2018, Best city for Women Safety- 2013, Best City Cleanliness and Sanitation- 2013, National Winner of WWF's One Planet City Challenge 2018, National Award For Implementation of Food Safety Act-2016

=== Performing arts ===
Rajkot is a major regional centre for the arts, with many venues for the performing arts in the city. Hemu Gadhavi Natyagraha.

=== Music ===
Rajkot has its own native music genre, called Dayro, which is used to convey folk stories and sayings.

=== Sports ===
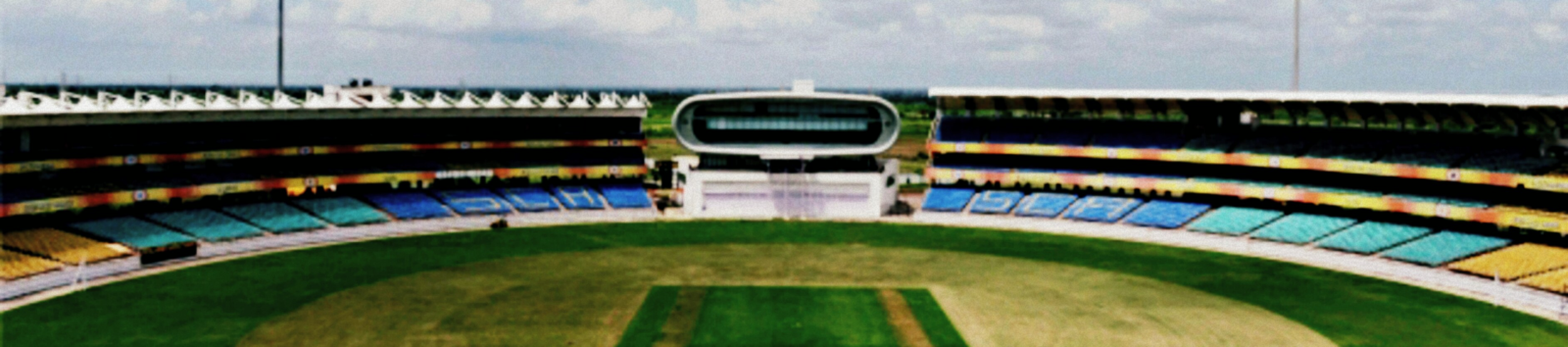
Niranjan Shah Stadium, Rajkot

Cricket is the most popular sport in the city. One-day internationals, domestic tournaments such as the Ranji Trophy, the Duleep Trophy and many inter-school and collegiate tournaments are played at the Madhavrao Sindhia Cricket Ground. The newly constructed 2nd International Cricket Stadium situated in Rajkot, Niranjan Shah Stadium, formerly known as Saurashtra Cricket Association Stadium and Khandheri Cricket Stadium, is a cricket stadium in Khandheri, about 15 kilometers outside Rajkot. The Stadium has a capacity of 28,000 spectators. In this cricket stadium, Day/Night matches can now also be played. It hosts the Indian national cricket team and Saurashtra cricket team matches. The stadium hosted its 1st International Cricket Match played on 11 January 2013 between India and England. Till date this venue has hosted multiple international Tests, ODIs and T20Is. This stadium also hosted several IPL matches during 2016-17, when Gujarat Lions opted for Rajkot as their home base. The stadium will part of a larger sports complex that will include venues for other sports such as badminton, basketball, and volleyball. Rajkot has produced cricketers such as Karsan Ghavri and Cheteshwar Pujara who have been members of the Indian national cricket team. Rajkot has many other cricket grounds around the city, including the Railway Cricket Ground and the Rajkumar College South Ground. Apart from cricket, other sports such as hockey, football, volleyball, badminton, tennis, table-tennis, chess, swimming, and squash are rapidly growing popular in the city. There has been a significant increase in recent years in the number of private sports clubs, gymkhanas, and gymnasiums. Kathiawar Gymkhana, Veer Savarkar Indoor Stadium, Swami Vivekananda Indoor Stadium and swimming pools of Rajkot Municipal Corporation are major sports clubs in the city. Recently, the Gujarat Hockey Team (Under 14) was assembled with all 16 players coming from Rajkot. A new modernized cricket ground is even under construction at the outskirts. Rajkot Municipal Corporation also owns a 9-hole golf course at Ishwaria. It is maintained by Green Meadows Golf Club.

=== Festivals ===
Garba is popular among both, men and women and is performed during the festival of Navratri. The dance starts before midnight and continues until dawn. Mata Ambe, who rides a lion, has a special reverential status with any highly religious Gujarati. The 'Janmastami Mela' is organised for five days at the Race Course grounds to celebrate Janmastami. Diwali is one of the most important festival and is usually a week long holiday. Rajkot Municipal Corporation arranges the annual Fireworks Show for the citizens of Rajkot during the Diwali festival. Holi is also celebrated with frolic and is widely enjoyed by most of the city folk. People also celebrate Makar Sankranti (Uttarayan) on 14 January by flying kites from their terraces.

== Economy ==
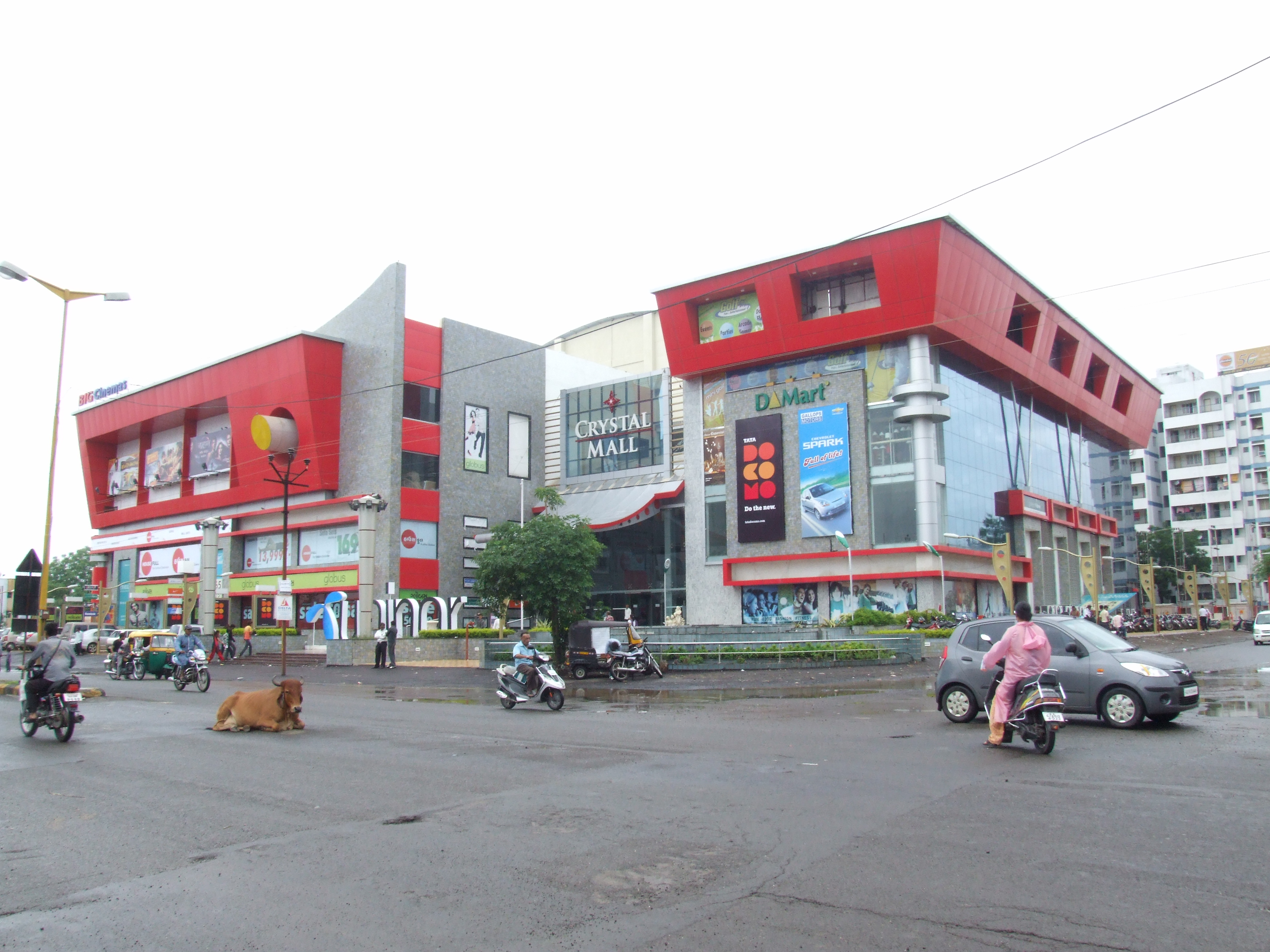
Crystal Mall

The city contributes to the economy of the state with heavy and small scale industries under the patronage of Gujarat Industrial Development Corporation (GIDC) and Gujarat State Financial Corporation (GSFC).

=== Municipal finance ===
According to financial data published on the CityFinance Portal of the Ministry of Housing and Urban Affairs, the Rajkot Municipal Corporation reported total revenue receipts of ₹867 crore (US$104 million) and total expenditure of ₹1,009 crore (US$121 million) in 2022–23. Tax revenue accounted for about 31.6% of the total revenue, while the corporation received ₹55 crore in grants during the financial year.

=== Industry ===
Products made in Rajkot include jewellery, silk embroidery and watch parts. Industrial products include bearings, diesel engines, kitchen knives and other cutting appliances, watch parts (cases and bracelets), automotive parts, forging industry, casting industry, machine tools, share market and software development. The city is also home to several CNC machine and auto parts manufacturers.

There are about 500 foundry units in Rajkot. The cluster came up mainly to cater to the casting requirements of the local diesel engine industry. The geographical spread of the cluster includes Aji Vasahat, Gondal Road, Bhavanagar Road areas, Shapar, Veraval and Metoda. The majority of foundry units in Rajkot produce grey iron castings for the domestic market. About 2% of the foundry units export castings such as electric motor castings and automobile castings.

Rajkot also houses Western Region Pipelines Headquarter of Indian Oil Corporation Limited (IOCL) near Gauridad village. Also natural gas industries like GSPL and GSPC are also present. A petroleum depot of IOCL is also present.

In 2006, the Rajkot Engineering Association announced plans too seek approval from the government of Gujarat to establish a Special Economic Zone.

== Infrastructure ==
=== Rajkot Greenfield Smart City ===
The city of Rajkot involves development of a Green Field Area covering approximately 930 acres of land with an estimated project cost of Rs 2100 cr. Design planned by INI design studio, the project is envisaged to have world class, Smart physical infrastructure with utilities that are environment friendly, sustainable, functionally smart and technology driven. The Rajkot Smart City Plan achieved a perfect score of 81 out of 81 points and was awarded the highest Platinum rating by the Indian Green Building Council (IGBC), making it the first green-rated Platinum-level Smart City in India.

The Rajkot Municipal Corporation (RMC) has secured the third rank in the Indian Smart Cities Awards Content (ISAC) 2022 for its project of rejuvenating Atal Sarovar in area specific development component of Smart City initiative. Rajkot’s smart city plan involves a new water management system.

== Law and government ==
Rajkot is governed by many government bodies, including Jilla Seva Sadan (Rajkot District Collector Offices), Rajkot Municipal Corporation, Rajkot Urban Development Authority.

| Preceded by Pradip Dav | City Mayor; Sep 2023–present | Succeeded by Naynaben Pedhadiya |
| Preceded by Anand Patel | City Municipal Commissioner; April 2023–present | Succeeded by Tushar D. Sumera |
| Preceded by IPS Raju Bhargava | City Police Commissioner; May 2022–present | Succeeded by Brajesh Kumar Jha |

The city civic body has started a 24x7 call centre, the first of its kind in Gujarat and the second in the country to take care of all complaints relating to civic management. Citizens can now get all their complaints registered with the Rajkot Municipal Corporation by dialling a single number with an assurance that the problem would be addressed within 72 hours.

The Rajkot City Police are responsible for law enforcement and public safety in Rajkot, India. They are a subdivision of the state police force of Gujarat and are headed by a commissioner. The Rajkot police force is responsible for the protection and safety of Rajkot citizens.

== Transport ==
Rajkot is well connected to major Indian cities by air, rail and road.

=== Roads and highways ===
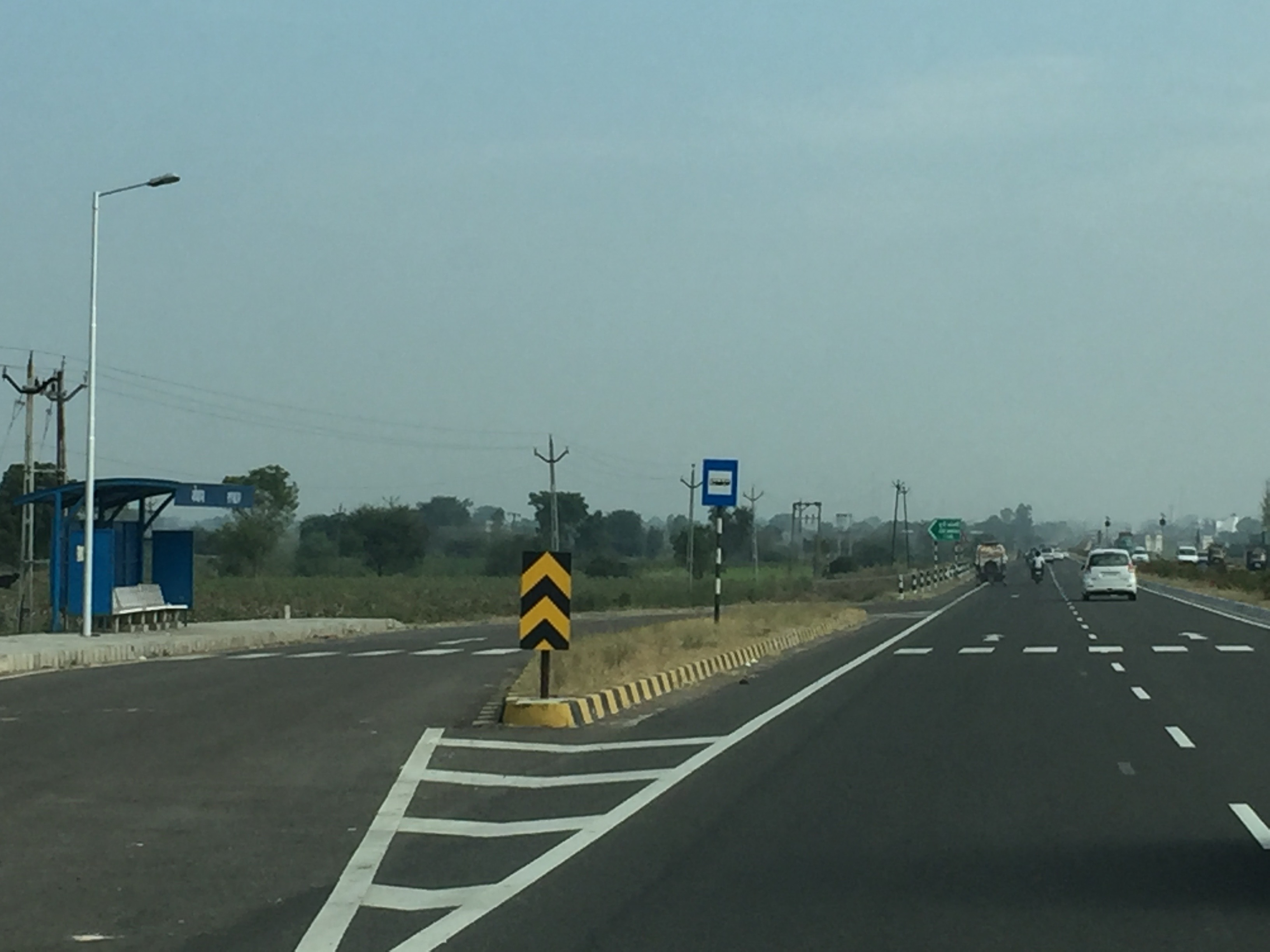
Road network near Rajkot

The Gujarat State Road Transport Corporation (GSRTC) runs regular buses to and from Rajkot to other cities of Gujarat and several cities of neighbouring states. More than 27 lakh people travel daily with GSRTC. Rajkot is very well connected with the Gujarat State Highways and the National highways of India. Rajkot is allocated the vehicle registration code GJ-03 by RTO. There are a number of private bus operators connecting the city with other cities of Gujarat and various other states of India.

=== Rail and internal transport ===
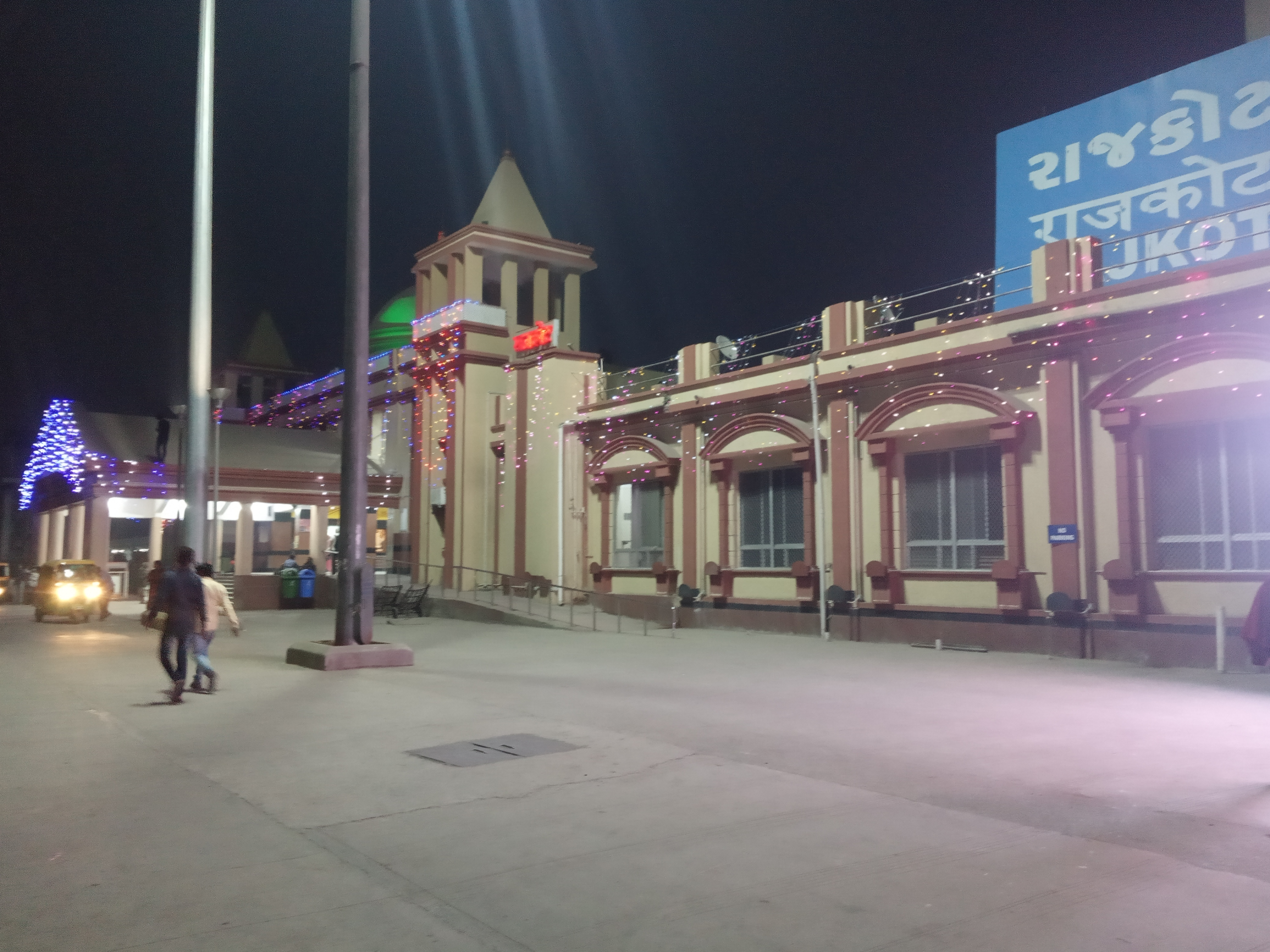
Rajkot Junction railway station

Rajkot has two railway stations. Rajkot Junction railway station (station code: RJT) is the more widely used railway station for passenger trains, and has services to all the major cities of India. Its elevation is 128 m above sea level. The other, smaller, railway station is Bhaktinagar railway station (station code: BKNG), served only by trains from Somnath, Veraval, Junagadh and Porbandar.

Rajkot Municipal Corporation has restored city bus services with Public Private Partnership in 2007. RMC and a private company is providing around 80 CNG buses under 15 to 20 routes in city and suburbs.

Rajkot BRTS

Rajkot BRTS was launched on 1 October 2012. This Bus rapid transit System (BRTS) currently has a 10.5-km long Blue corridor with 19 stations and a fleet of multiple electric AC buses are serving this route. The corridor is located in the west part of the city through the 150 Ft Ring road connecting Madhapar chokdi on the Jamnagar road to Gondal chokdi on the Gondal road.

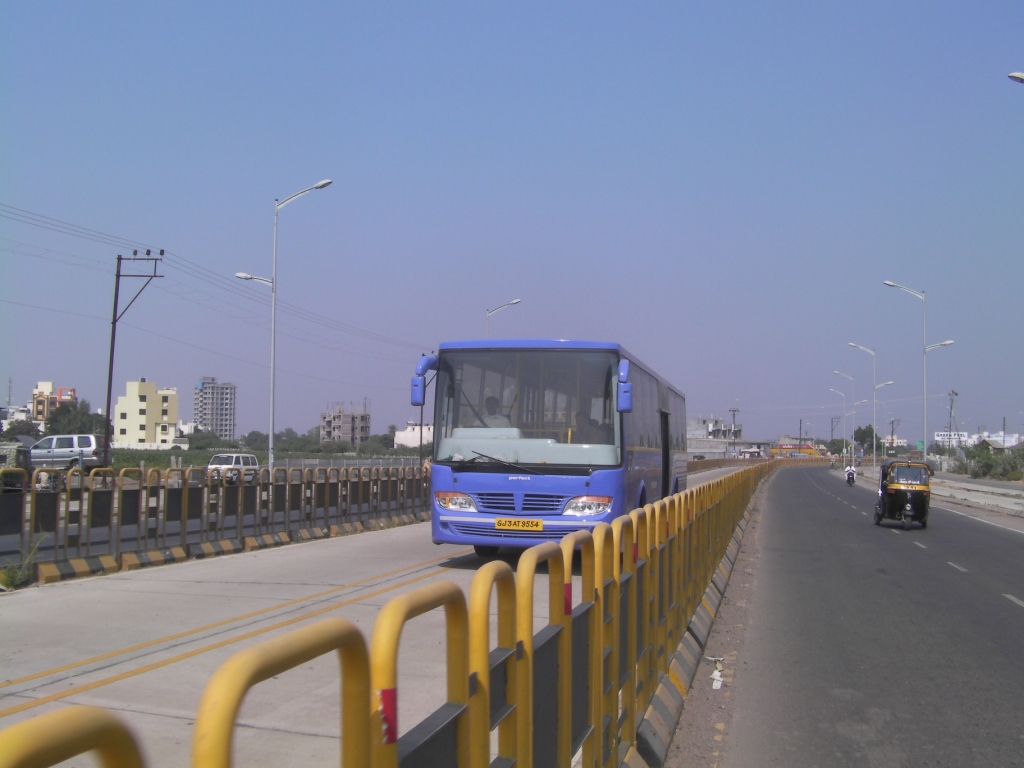
Rajkot BRTS Bus and the Corridor

The fully completed project in future will have two more corridors – Green and Red from Arvind Maniyar Nagar to Saurashtra University and Greenland Chowk to Saurashtra University respectively involving 157 buses in three colours. Rajkot thus becomes the second city in Gujarat to have BRTS after Ahmedabad. After the operational success of BRT system in Ahmedabad and Rajkot, Surat too inaugurated it's BRTS in 2013.

Rajkot Metro

GMRC, a joint venture company between the Government of India and Government of Gujarat has submitted a detailed project report (DPR) for the Rajkot Metro to the Union Government. Rajkot Metro will be 38 km long and will have two lines, predominantly elevated with some underground stations. The total estimated cost of this project is Rs 10,000 crore. Similar DPR is also submitted for the Vadodara Metro. Currently GMRC operates the Ahmedabad Metro and will inaugurate Surat Metro in 2027.

=== Air ===
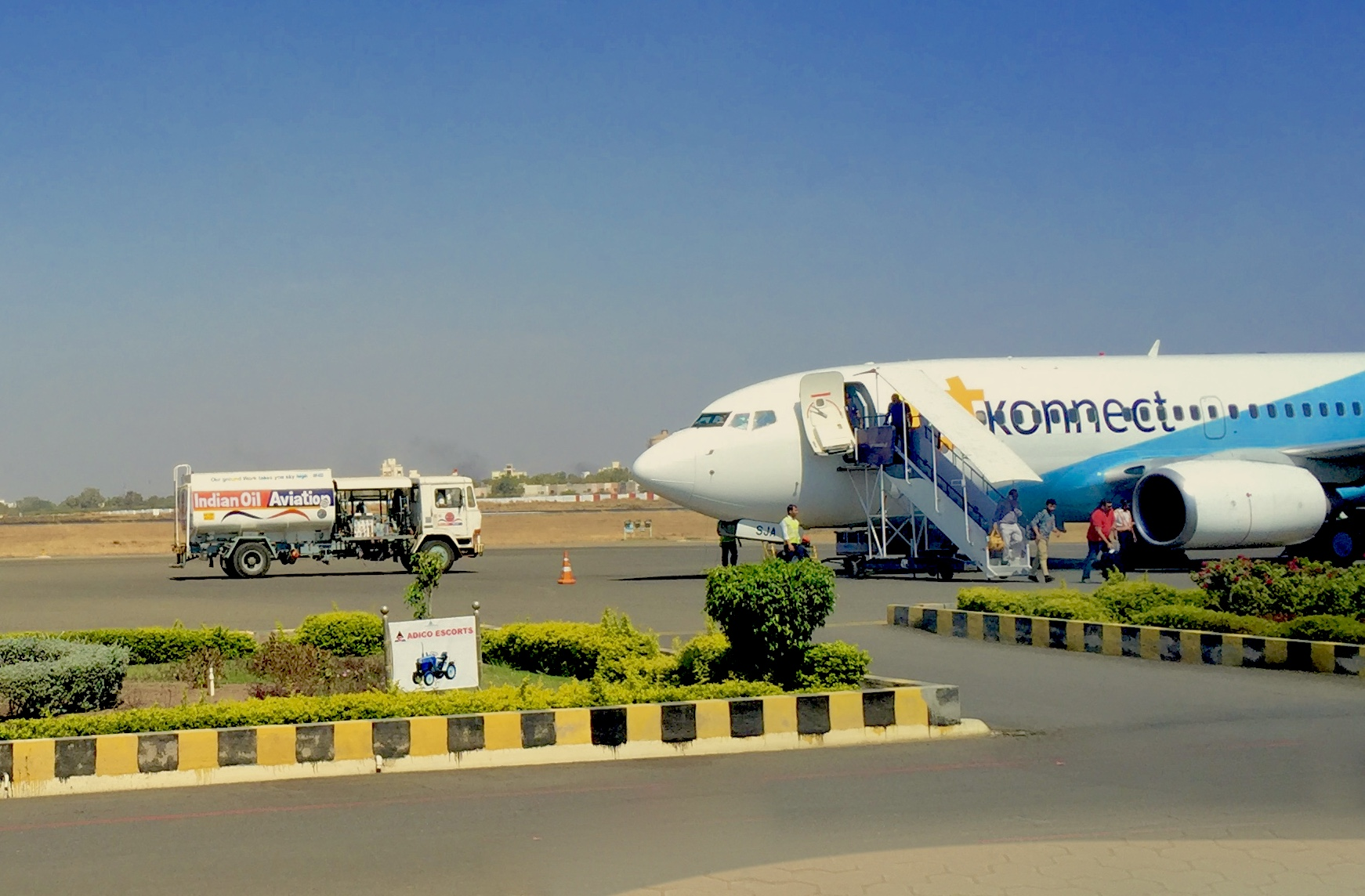
An aircraft and refuelling truck on the apron at Rajkot Airport

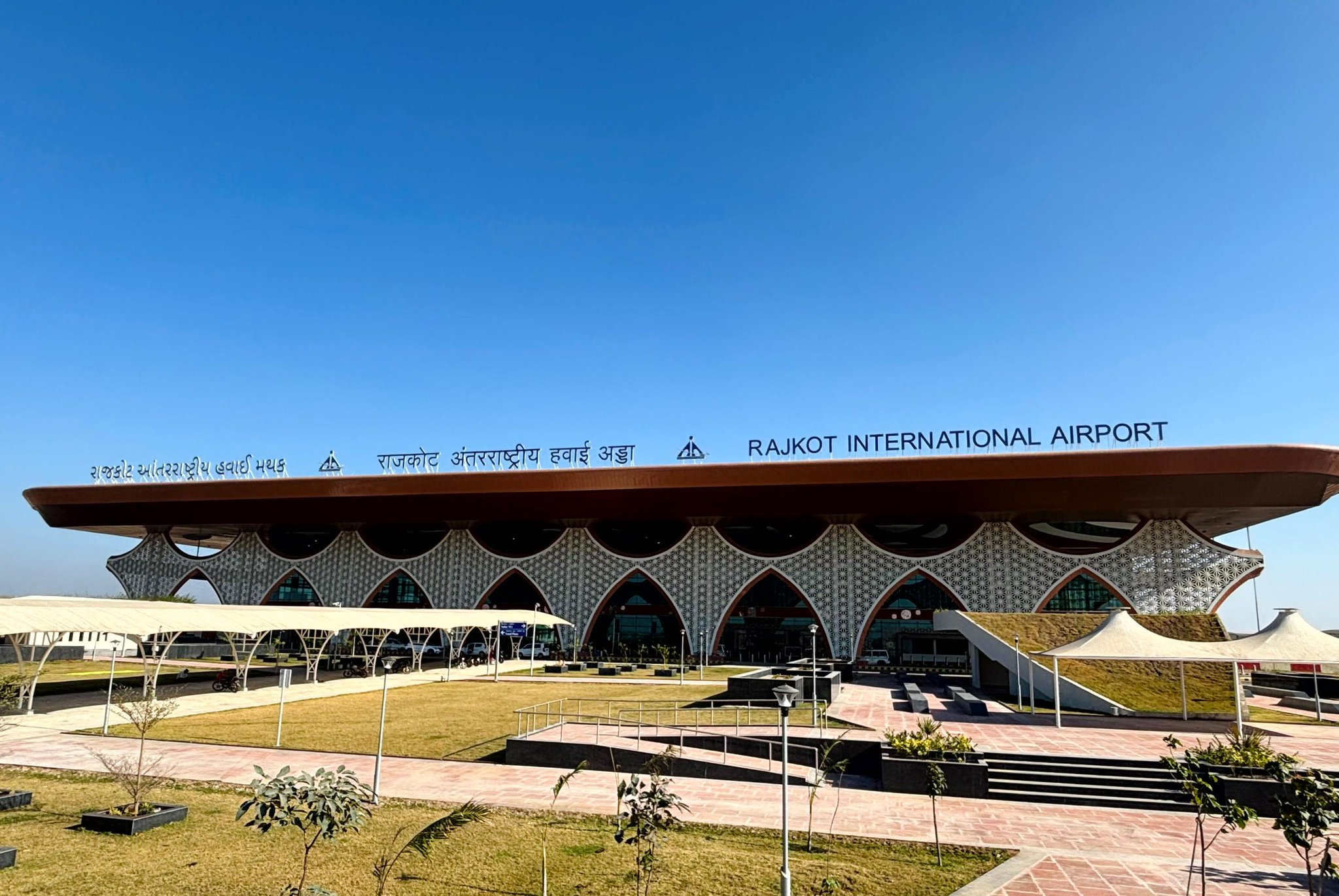
Rajkot International Airport

Rajkot International Airport (IATA: HSR, ICAO: VAHS) is located at Hirasar, along National Highway 47 (NH-8B) connecting Ahmedabad and Rajkot, about 36 km (22 mi) from the city. There are daily flights to Mumbai, Delhi, Bengaluru, Goa, Hyderabad, Pune and Surat served by IndiGo, Air India and Ventura AirConnect.

The older Rajkot Airport (IATA: RAJ, ICAO: VARK) remains open for general aviation, including charter flights. All commercial operations were shifted to the Rajkot International Airport on 10 September 2023.

== Media and communications ==
State-owned All India Radio has a local station and has an FM channel 102.4 Vividh Bharati in Rajkot which transmits various programs of mass interest. Rajkot also has various private local news media and digital websites. Private FM stations like 98.3 Radio Mirchi, 93.5 Red FM, 92.7 Big FM and 94.3 MY FM also serve the people of Rajkot with excellent entertainment and events.

== Education ==
RK University

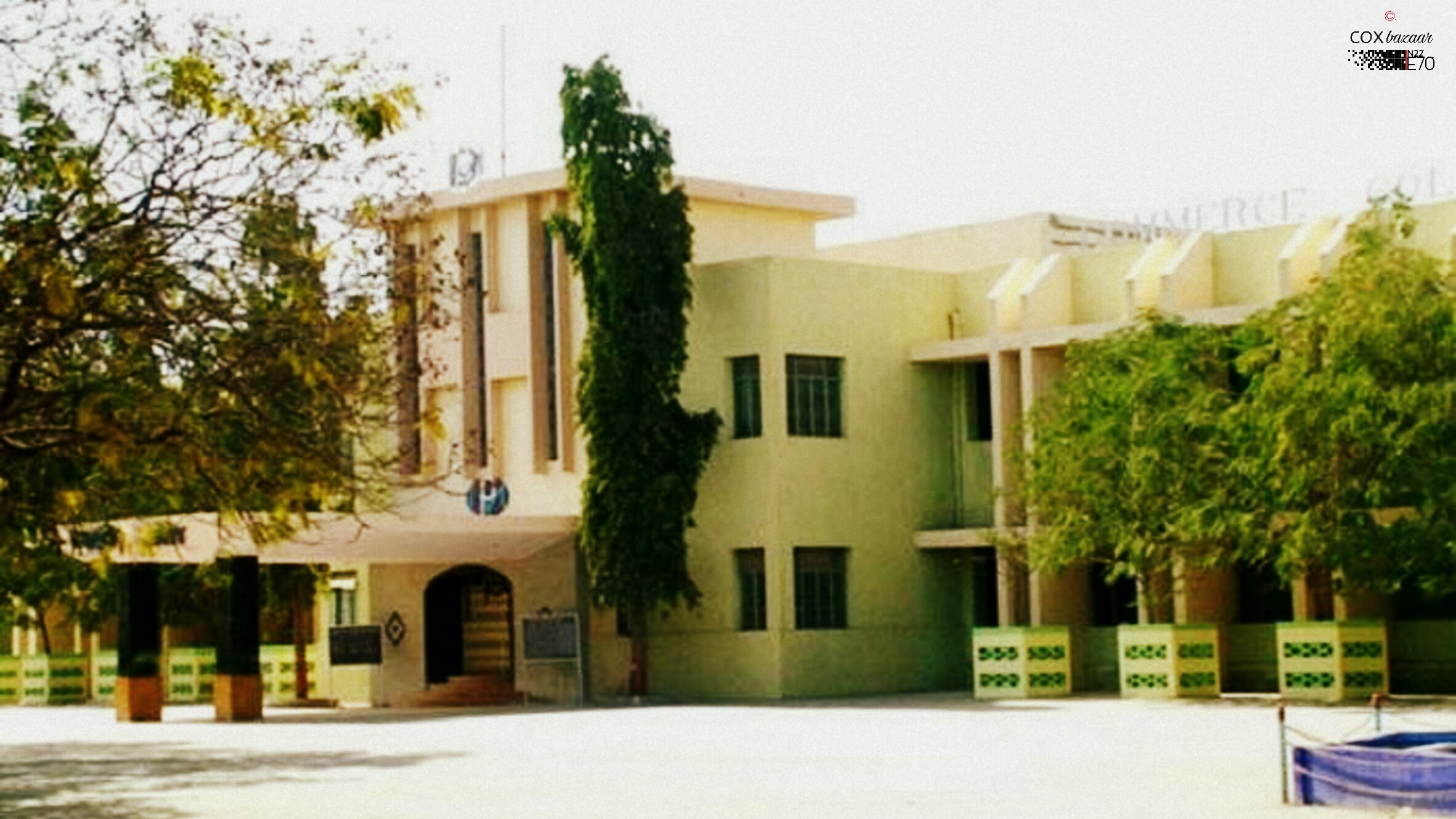
PDM College of Commerce

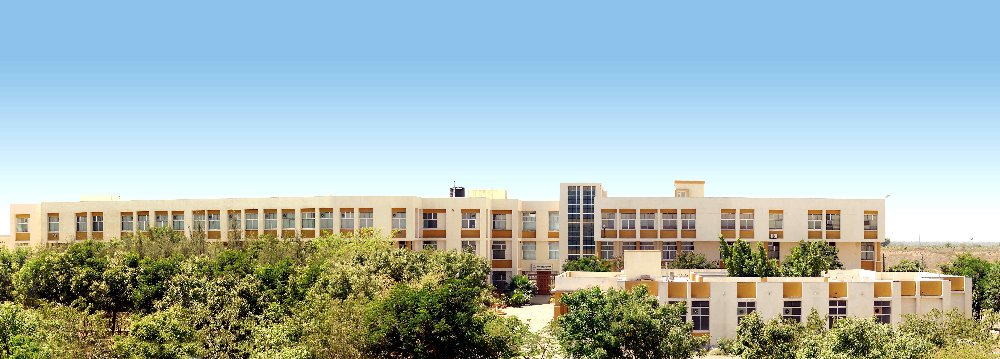
Christ College

Rajkot is famous for providing education to Mahatma Gandhi, at the Alfred High School. A number of schools in the city are run by Rajkot Municipal Corporation. They include 20 schools and learning centres, which consist of 3 elementary schools, 7 middle schools, 4 junior high schools, 4 senior high schools, 1 education centre, and 1 special school. Rajkot is home to Rajkumar College, Rajkot, also known as RKC. RKC is the oldest of the Chiefs' schools of India similar to Mayo College at Ajmer and Daly College at Indore.

Rajkot also has the Union Government HRD Ministry run Jawahar Navodaya Vidyalaya. It was started at the Juni Khadki school premise of Sir Lakhajiraj High School and later moved to its own building on the Jamnagar Road. It is a CBSE Board affiliated, residential school for girls and boys, providing education to those selected at the Class VI level all India entrance test.

The city is home to Saurashtra University, several colleges, and other institutions of higher education, both public and private. Rajkot has three private universities, RK University, Atmiya University and Marwadi University. The city has 12 engineering colleges. It has a Performing Arts College (Vocal, Classical dance, Tabla vadan etc.) opposite Hemu Gadhvi Natya Gruh. The Saurashtra University is the city's public university. It is spread across approximately 410 acres (1.7 km^{2}) of green land with 28 post-graduation departments.

Pandit Deendayal Upadhyay Medical College is government medical college in Rajkot. It was established in 1995 and offers MBBS, MD and MS courses. AIIMS Rajkot, an AIIMS institute has started its medical college with its inaugural batch of MBBS Students in December 2020.

== Healthcare ==
The Civil Hospital, also known as the Pandit Deendayal Upadhyay Civil Hospital (PDUCH) is the largest government hospital in the city. It is affiliated with Pandit Deendayal Upadhyay Government Medical College, which was established in 1995 and admits around 150 MBBS students annually.

AIIMS Rajkot is a centrally funded public medical institution established in 2020 on the outskirts of Rajkot. It provides tertiary healthcare services and offers undergraduate and postgraduate medical education, along with research facilities.

Private hospitals include Synergy Super-speciality Hospital and branches of the Sterling Hospital chain and the Wockhardt Hospitals chain.

== See also ==
- List of cities in India
- List of million-plus cities in India
- List of most populous cities in India
- List of most populous metropolitan areas in India
- List of twin towns and sister cities in India
- Status of Indian cities
- Largest Indian Cities by GDP
