= Nitish V. Thakor =

- Born: 1952 (age 73–74); Nagpur, India
- Citizenship: USA
- Education: Indian Institutes of Technology Bombay, India; University of Wisconsin, Madison
- Spouse: Ruchira Thakor
- Scientific career
- Fields: Neuroengineering, Medical Sensors and Instrumentation, Biomedical Engineering
- Workplaces: Johns Hopkins School of Medicine; Johns Hopkins Department of Biomedical Engineering; Case Western Reserve
- Thesis: [http:?? Design, Implementation and Evaluation of Microprocessor-based Arrhythmia Monitor] (1981)
- Doctoral advisor: John G. Webster
- Other academic advisors: Willis J. Tompkins

Nitish V. Thakor (koli) (born 1952) is an American biomedical engineer and is a professor of Biomedical Engineering at the Johns Hopkins University, a professor of Electrical and Computer Engineering, and a professor of Neurology at the Johns Hopkins University. He is also the director of the Singapore Institute for Neurotechnology (SINAPSE) at the National University of Singapore. Thakor is a leading researcher in Neuroengineering, having pioneered technologies for brain monitoring to prosthetic arms and neuroprostheses.

Thakor has authored more than 360 refereed journal papers (h-index 68; i10-index 313 as of November 2017)
