= Rajkot State =

Princely state of India

Coordinates: 22.3000°N 70.7833°E

Rajkot State રાજકોટ રજવાડું
- Princely State of British India
- 1620–1948
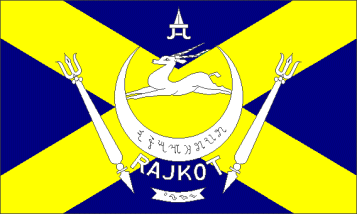
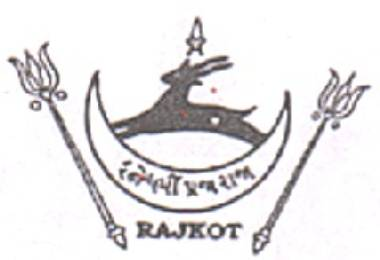
- Flag Coat of arms

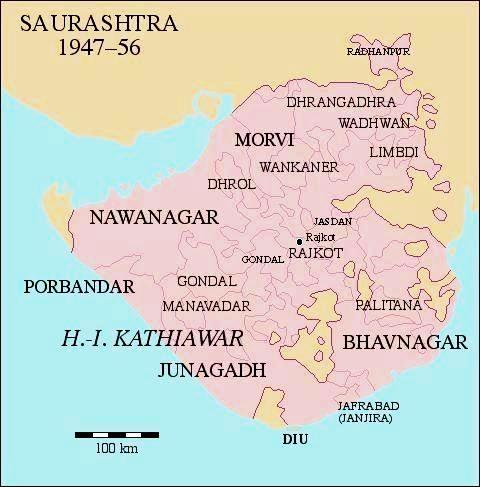
- Location of Rajkot State in Saurashtra
- Capital: Rajkot
- Area
  - 1931: 730 km^{2} (280 sq mi)
- Population
  - 1931: 75,540
  - Type: Monarchy
- History
  - Established: 1620
  - Accession to the Indian Union: 15 February 1948
Succeeded by
India

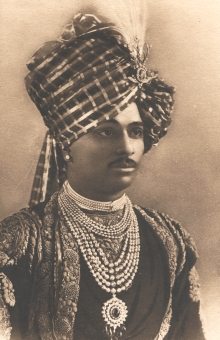
Thakor Lakhajirajsinhji II Bavajirajsinhji of Rajkot.

Rajkot State was one of the princely states of India during the period of British rule. It was a 9-gun salute state belonging to the Kathiawar Agency of the Bombay Presidency. Its capital was in Rajkot, located in the historical Halar region of Kathiawar on the banks of the Aji River. Nowadays, Rajkot is the fourth largest city of Gujarat state.

== History ==
Rajkot was founded by Thakur Sahib Vibhoji Ajoji Jadeja in 1620. He was the grandson of Jam Shri Satarsal (Sataji) Vibhaji Jadeja of Nawanagar. Jadeja Shri Viblioji was the founder of House of Rajkot. Jam Sataji of Nawanagar who died in 1608 A. D. had three sons Ajoji, Jasaji and Vibhaji. Ajaji who was slain in the battle known as “Bhucherinori ” had two sons Lakhaji and Vibhaji. Opinion is divided as to which of these two Vibhajis was the founder of the Rajkot House. One version maintains that Vibhaji, the son of Jam Sataji, was the founder. Another version associates with this circumstance the name of Vibhaji, the grandson of Jam Sataji. The kotwals of the royal palace of Rajkot.

== Rulers and administrators ==
The rulers of Rajkot were titled 'Thakur Sahib' with the style of 'His Highness, and belonged to the Jadeja Rajput dynasty.

=== Thakur Sahibs ===
- 1694 – 1720 Mehramamji vibhaji

II (d. 1720)

- 1720 – 1732 Masum Khan Shughaat-Mughal governor(d. 1732)
- 1732 – 1746 Ranmalji I Mehramamji (d. 1746)
- 1746 – 17.. Lakhaji I Ranmalji (1st time) (d. 1796)
- 17.. – 1794 Mehramamji III Lakhaji (d. 1794)
- 1794 – 1795 Lakhaji I Ranmalji (2nd time) (s.a.)
- 1795 – 1825 Ranmalji II Mehramamji (d. 1825)
- 1825 – 1844 Surajji Ranmalji (d. 1844)
- 1844 – 8 Nov 1862 Mehramamji IV Surajji (d. 1862)
- 8 Nov 1862 – 16 Apr 1890 Bawajiraj Mehrmansinhji (b. 1856 – d. 1890)
- 1862 – 1867 Thakurani Bai Shri Naniba (d. 1893) Kunverba (f) -Regent
  - 1867 – 17 Jan 1876 J.H. Lloyd -Regent
- 16 Apr 1890 – 2 Feb 1930 Lakhajiraj III Bawajiraj (b. 1885 – d. 1930) (from 3 Jun 1918, Sir Lakhajiraj III Bawajiraj)
  - 16 Apr 1890 – 21 Oct 1907 .... -Regent
- 2 Feb 1930 – 11 Jun 1940 Dharmendrasinhji Lakhajirajsinhji (b. 1910 – d. 1940)
- 11 Jun 1940 – 15 Aug 1947 Pradyumansinhji Lakhajirajsinhji (b. 1913 – d. 1973)

The city of Rajkot became the headquarters of the Western India States Agency in 1924.

== See also ==
- List of Rajput dynasties
