= Thakur (title) =

Feudal title of the Indian subcontinent

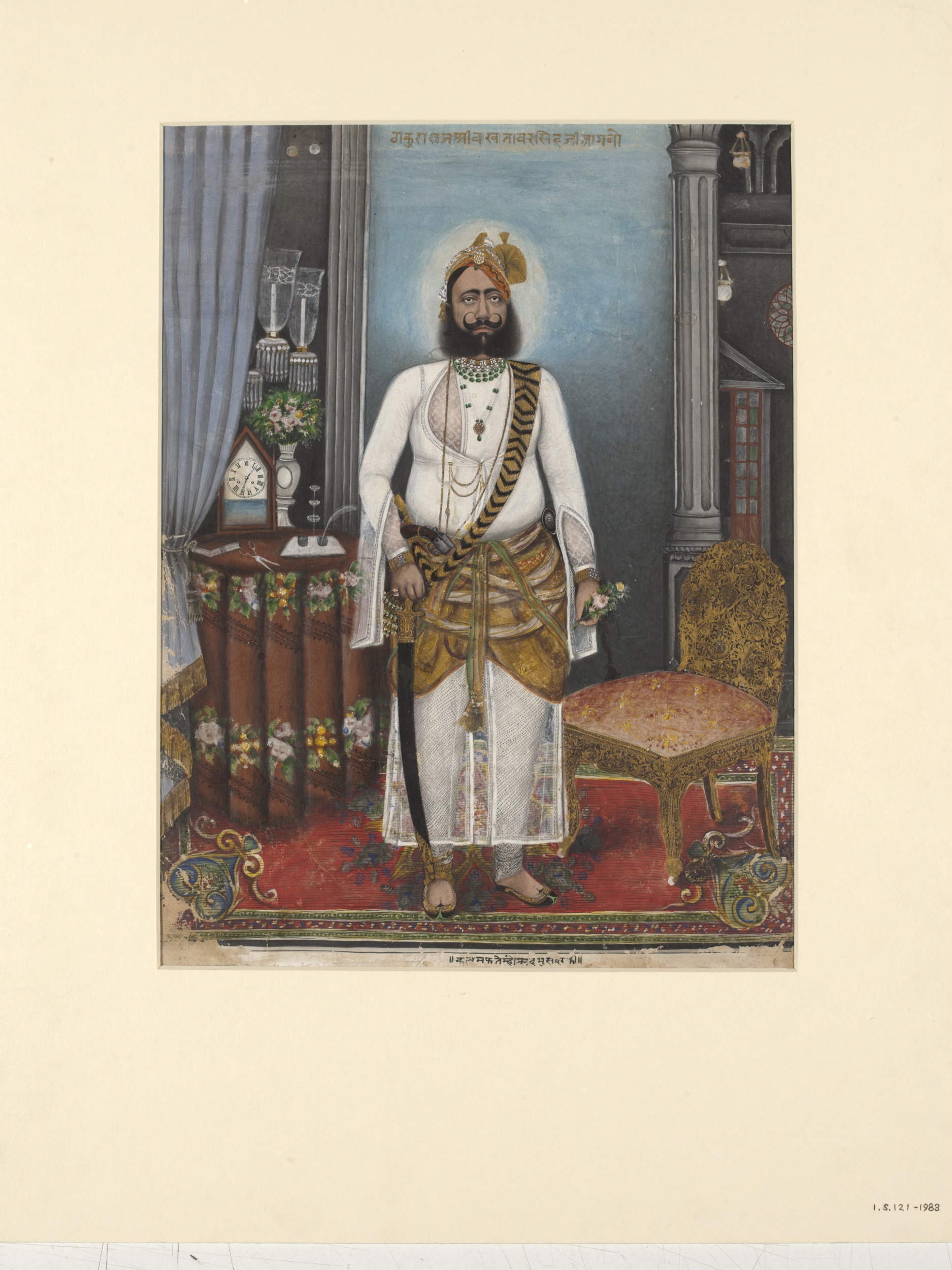
Portrait of Thakur Bakhtawar Singh Rajput made by Fateh Muhammad around 1880 in western Rajasthan, probably Bikaner.

Thakur (Anglicized as Tagore) is a historical feudal title of the Indian subcontinent. It is also used as a surname in the present day. The female variant of the title is Thakurani or Thakurain, and is also used to describe the wife of a Thakur.

There are varying opinions among scholars about its origin. Some scholars suggest that it is not mentioned in the Sanskrit texts preceding 500 BCE, but speculates that it might have been a part of the vocabulary of the dialects spoken in northern India before the Gupta Empire. It is viewed to have been derived from word Thakkura which, according to several scholars, was not an original word of the Sanskrit language but a borrowed word in the Indian lexis from the Tukharistan region of Uzbekistan. Another view-point is that Thakkura is a loan word from the Prakrit language.

Scholars have suggested differing meanings for the word, i.e. "god", "lord", and "master of the estate". Academics have suggested that it was only a title, and in itself, did not grant any authority to its users "to wield some power in the state".

In India, this title is widely used by the people belonging to the Rajput community while few people of other communities also use this title include communities such as, Bengali Brahmins, Bhumihars, Charans and Kolis.

== Etymology and meaning ==
Sisir Kumar Das stated that the word Thakur is derived from the "late Sanskrit" word Thakkura.

Harka Bahadur Gurung noted that the Nepalese version of the word Thakur is Thakuri.

The meaning of the word Thakur was suggested to be "god" by S. K. Das; "lord" by Blair B. Kling; and "master of the estate" by H. B. Gurung.

== Origin ==
Nirmal Chandra Sinha stated that the word Thakura is "unknown" to the Vedic and Classical Sanskrit and finds no mention in the Sanskrit literature preceding 500 BCE. He suggests, however, that "the word was possibly current in many north Indian dialects before the Imperial Guptas". Sinha notes that many scholars, such as Buddha Prakash, Frederick Thomas, Harold Bailey, Prabodh Bagchi, Suniti Chatterji, and Sylvain Lévi, have suggested that Thakura is a borrowed word in the Indian lexis from the Tukhara regions of Current Uzbekistan. Sinha observed:

"It may be noted that in South India among orthodox Brahmins, Thakura or Thakur is not a popular term obviously because of its Tukhara or Turuska background."

Byomkes Chakrabarti noted that the Sanskrit word Thakkura finds mention in "late Sanskrit". He doubted, however, that Thakkura is "an original Sanskrit word" and was of the opinion that Thakkura is probably a loan word from the Prakrit language.

== Usage ==
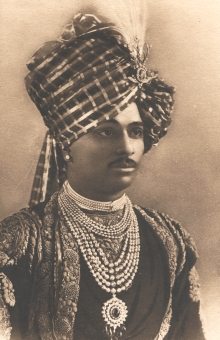
Thakur Lakhajirajsinhji II Bavajirajsinhji of Rajkot

Susan Snow Wadley noted that the title Thakur was used to refer to "a man of indeterminate but mid-level caste, usually implying a landowning caste". Wadley further notes that Thakur was viewed as a "more modest" title in comparison to "Rājā" (King).

S. K. Das noted that while the word thakur means "god".

In India, this title is widely used by the people belonging to the Rajput caste while few people of some other caste groups using it include castes such as, Bengali Brahmin, Bhumihar, Koli and Charan.

Some academics have suggested that "Thakur was merely a title and not an office whereby a holder was entitled to wield some power in the state". However, some other academics have noted that this title had been used by "petty chiefs" in the western areas of Himachal Pradesh. Examples include the Thakurs of Kolong, Gumrang, and Gondhla in Lahaul, who governed hereditary jagirs in Lahaul under the Rajas of Kullu, and later under British rule.

The title was used by rulers of several princely states, including Ambliara, Vala, Morbi, Barsoda, and Rajkot State. Sons of thakurs were given the Sanskrit title of Kumara ('prince'), popular usage being Kunwar in the North and Kumar in Bengal and southern India.

The territory of land under the control of a Thakur was called thikana.

== See also ==
- Sardar
- Chaudhary
- Mankari
- Thakkar
- Thakuri
- Thakor
- Thakurdas
- Rajputs in Bihar
- Dharmathakur
