= Maihar State =

Princely state of the British Raj

Coordinates: 24.00°N 80.75°E

- Princely State of British India
- 1770–1948
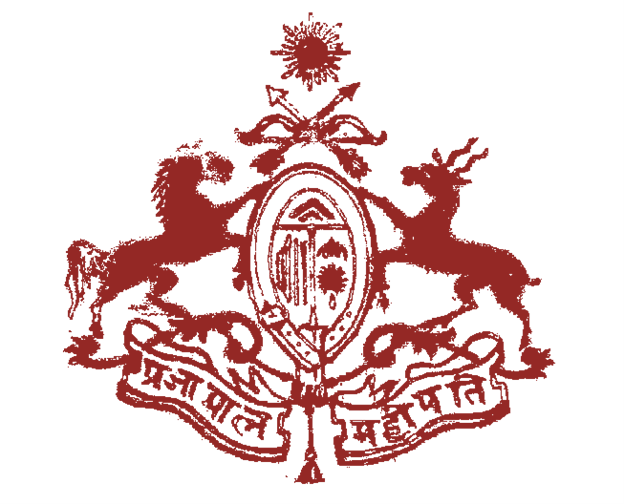
- Coat of arms

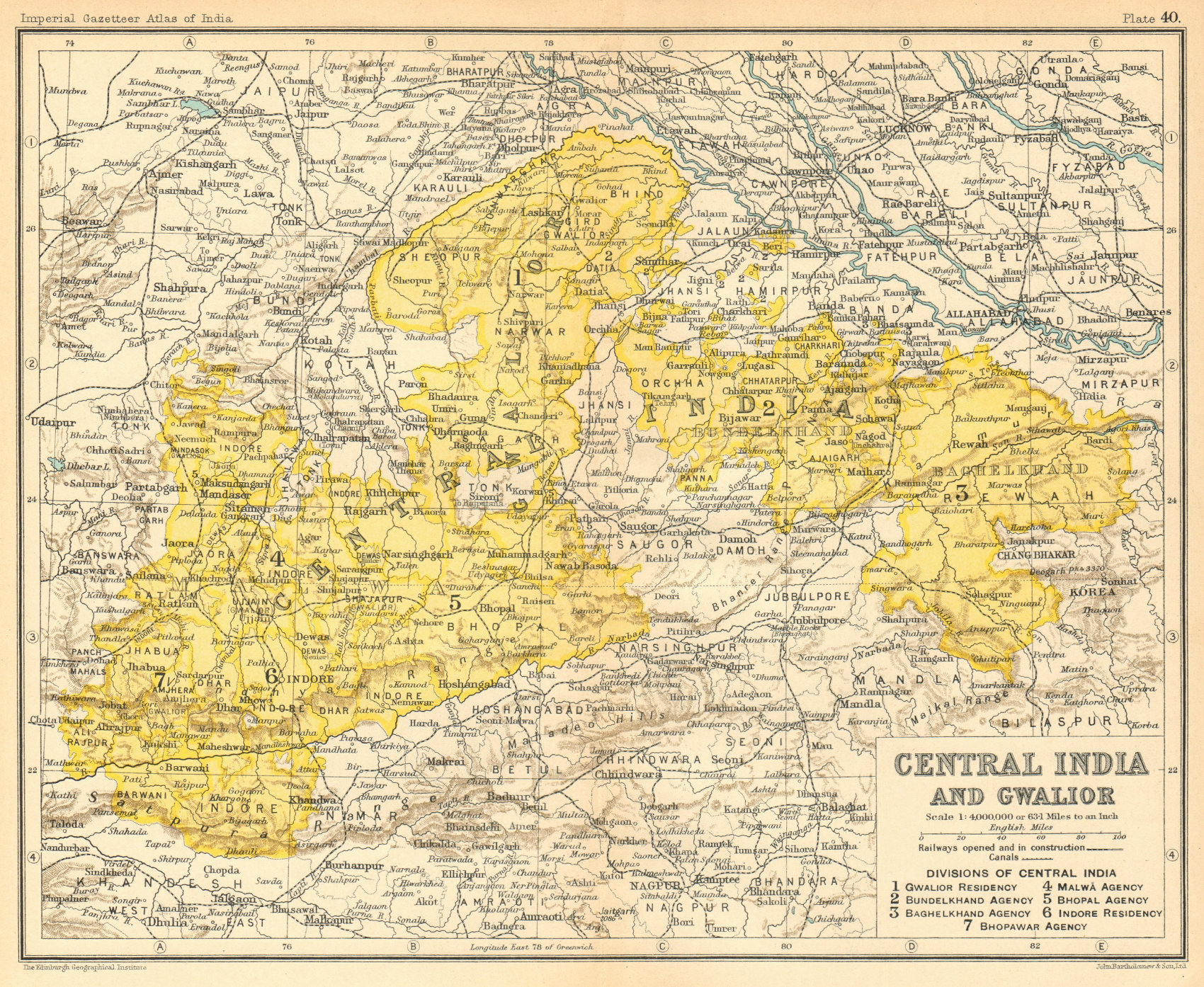
- Maihar State in the Imperial Gazetteer of India
- Area
  - 1940: 1,054 km^{2} (407 sq mi)
- Population
  - 1940: 79,558
- History
  - Established: 1770
  - Accession to the Union of India: 1948
Succeeded by
India
- Columbia-Lippincott Gazetteer. p.1122

Maihar State was a princely state in India during the British Raj, located in what is today Madhya Pradesh, central India. The state had an area of 1,050 square kilometres (407 sq mi), and a population of 63,702 in 1901. The state, which was watered by the Tons River, consists mainly of alluvial soil covering sandstone, and is fertile except in the hilly district of the south. A large area was under forest, the produce of which provided a small export trade.

The state gained India-wide and later, worldwide fame for Maihar gharana, a gharana or school of Indian classical music. It is one of the most prominent gharanas of the 20th century; much of the fame of Hindustani classical music in the west stems from this gharana.

== History ==
Maihar was originally a dependency of Rewa, but Harde Sah, the eldest son of Chhatrasal, took advantage of the minority of Audhut Singh Ju Deo of Rewa, attacked him, and annexed Maihar and Bijairaghogarh to his territories. Hindupat, the Raja of Panna, granted Maihar as a jagir to his minister, Beni Singh (or Beni Hazuri), in 1770. Beni was a grandson of Bhim Singh who served Chhatrasal. After the death of Beni Singh, his son Rajdhar succeeded him. Like other chiefs of Bundelkhand, he was conquered by Ali Bahadur. Ali Bahadur later restored Maihar to Beni Singh's younger son, Durjan Singh. When Bundelkhand fell to the British, Durjan executed a deed of allegiance to the British government in 1806. It was then administered as part of the Bundelkhand Agency under the Central India Agency. After Durjan's death in 1826, his territory was divided between his two sons. The eldest, Bishan Singh, succeeded him as the ruler of Maihar, while the younger, Prag Das, received the estate of Bijairaghogarh. Due to the rebellion of Prag's son, Surju Prasad, his estate was confiscated by the British government in 1858 and incorporated into the territories under the chief commissioner of the Central Provinces. Maihar claimed that Bijairaghogarh, which was originally part of it, should be restored to it. Although the claim was denied, due to the valuable services rendered to the British by the ruler of Maihar in 1857, he was granted 11 villages from the confiscated state in 1859.

In 1871 the eastern states of Bundelkhand Agency, including Maihar, were separated to form the new Bagelkhand Agency in Central India. In 1933 Maihar, along with ten other states in western Bagelkhand, were transferred back to the Bundelkhand Agency.

The state suffered severely from famine in 1896–1897. Maihar became a station on the East Indian Railway (now the West Central Railway) line between Satna and Jabalpur, 156 kilometres (97 mi) north of Jabalpur. Extensive ruins of shrines and other buildings surround the town. As of 1940 it had a population of 79,558 and an area of 412 square miles. In 1948 Maihar was merged into India.

=== Maihar gharana ===
Brijnath Singh, one of Maihar's rulers, was a great patron of music and had learned it under Allaudin Khan, who settled in his dominions in 1918. He made Allaudin a musician in his durbar. Though the Maihar gharana existed before Allaudin's arrival, he made it more famous, and as such, the success of the gharana is attributed to him. This gharana is unique because its tradition is passed down not through family members but from teacher to student.

== Rulers ==
The ancestors of the royal family are believed to have migrated from Alwar in the 17th or 18th century and acquired land from the then ruler of Orchha. The rulers of Maihar claimed to be Rajputs of the Kachhwaha clan and asserted their relation to the royal families of Jaipur and Alwar. However, no evidence supported this claim, and it was denied by Jaipur and other Kachhwaha families. Ruler was entitled to a salute of nine guns. The rulers were:

=== Thakurs ===
- 1770 – 1788 Beni Singh
- 1788 – 1790 Rajdhar Singh
- 1790 – 1826 Durjan Singh
- 1826 – 1850 Bishan Singh
- 1850 – 1852 Mohan Prasad
- 1852 – 1869 Raghubir Singh

=== Rajas ===
- 1869 – 1908 Raghubir Singh
- 1908 – 1910 Jadubir Singh
- 1910 – 1911 Randhir Singh
- 1911 – 1968 Brijnath Singh
