= Rajdhar Singh =

Thakur of Maihar from 1788 to 1790

- Thakur

Thakur of Maihar
- Reign: 4 July 1788 – c. 1790
- Predecessor: Beni Singh
- Successor: Durjan Singh
- House: Maihar
- Father: Beni Singh

Rajdhar Singh, or Rajdhar Huzuri, was the Thakur of Maihar from 1788 until 1790.

== Biography ==
When his father, Beni Singh, fell in the battle of Gathewara in 1788, he succeeded him as the Thakur of Maihar. Right after the battle in which his father was killed, he took command of the forces of Dhokal Singh, the Raja of Panna. He led his forces against those of Arjun Singh, commanded by Kirat Singh, in the battle of Chachariya. This battle, fought about four kos from Taraon, lasted for several hours and proved disastrous for the Bundelas. It left the combatants on both sides thoroughly exhausted and became the last battle fought between the states of Panna and Banda. He was ultimately defeated, and a significant portion of Panna’s territory was annexed into the dominions of the Raja of Banda. While serving as the Diwan to Dhokal Singh, he defeated Laxman Hari Newalkar, who had been sent to Panna by Mahadaji Shinde to collect overdue arrears. When Ali Bahadur of Banda invaded Bundelkhand, he defeated Rajdhar at Durgatal, though Rajdhar barely managed to escape. After the battle, Ali Bahadur took control of Maihar.

He was succeeded by his brother, Durjan Singh, who ascended the gaddi of Maihar in 1790 when Ali Bahadur restored the state to him.
