= Bhat family =

Indian family

Bhatt family
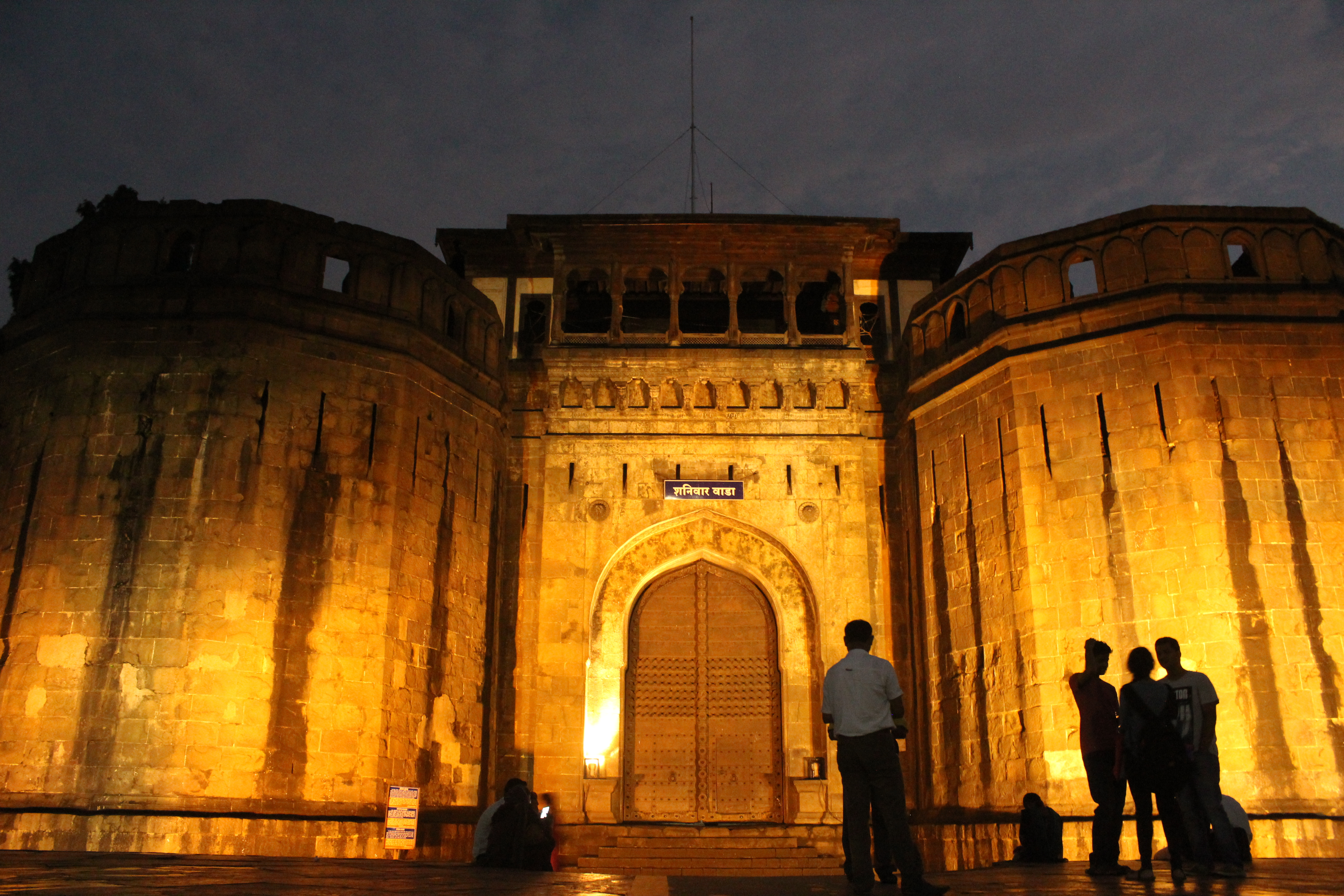
- Shaniwar Wada built in 1732
- Current region: Pune, Maharashtra, India
- Origin: Konkan, India
- Members: Vishwanathpant (Visaji) Bhatt; Balaji Vishwanath; Bajirao I Balaji Bajirao; Shamsher Bahadur I Madhavrao Peshwa; Narayanrao Peshwa; Raghunathrao; Ali Bahadur I Sawai Madhava Rao II Narayan; Baji Rao II; Nana Saheb Peshwa II

The Bhatt Peshwā family earlier known as Bhatt family is a prominent Indian Marathi Chitpavan Brahmin royal family. Most of the members in this family were the Peshwas (prime ministers) in the Maratha Empire, and Peshwa later became their family name. In the eighteenth century, most of the Indian subcontinent came under their control.

== Family tree ==
=== First generation ===
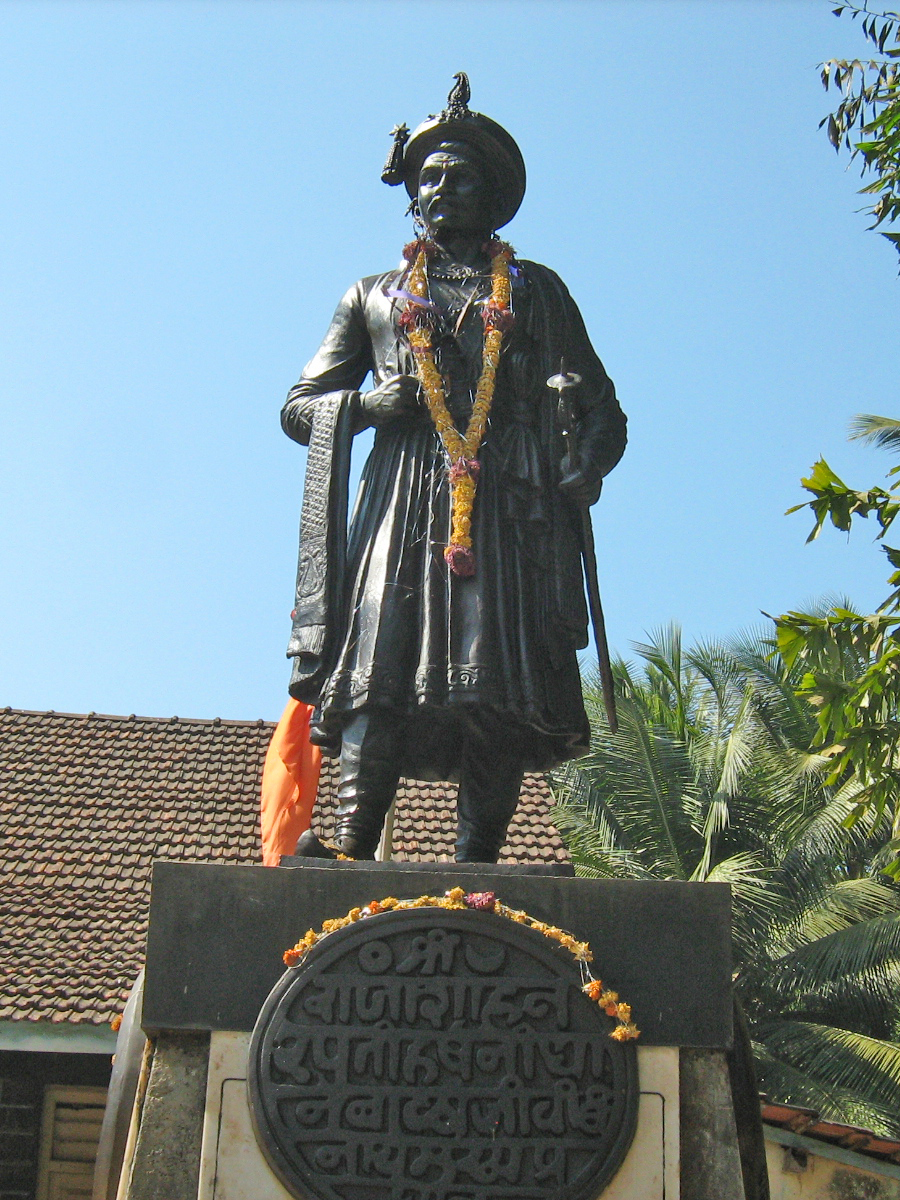
Statue of Balaji Vishwanath in Srivardhan

- Balaji Vishwanath was the first of a series of hereditary Peshwas (Marathi for Prime Minister) hailing from the Chitpavan Brahmin family who gained effective control of the Maratha Empire during the 18th century. Balaji Vishwanath assisted a young Maratha Emperor Shahu I, grandson of Shivaji, to consolidate his grip on a kingdom that had been racked by civil war and persistent attack by the Mughals under Aurangzeb. He was called "the second founder of the Maratha State."

=== Second generation ===
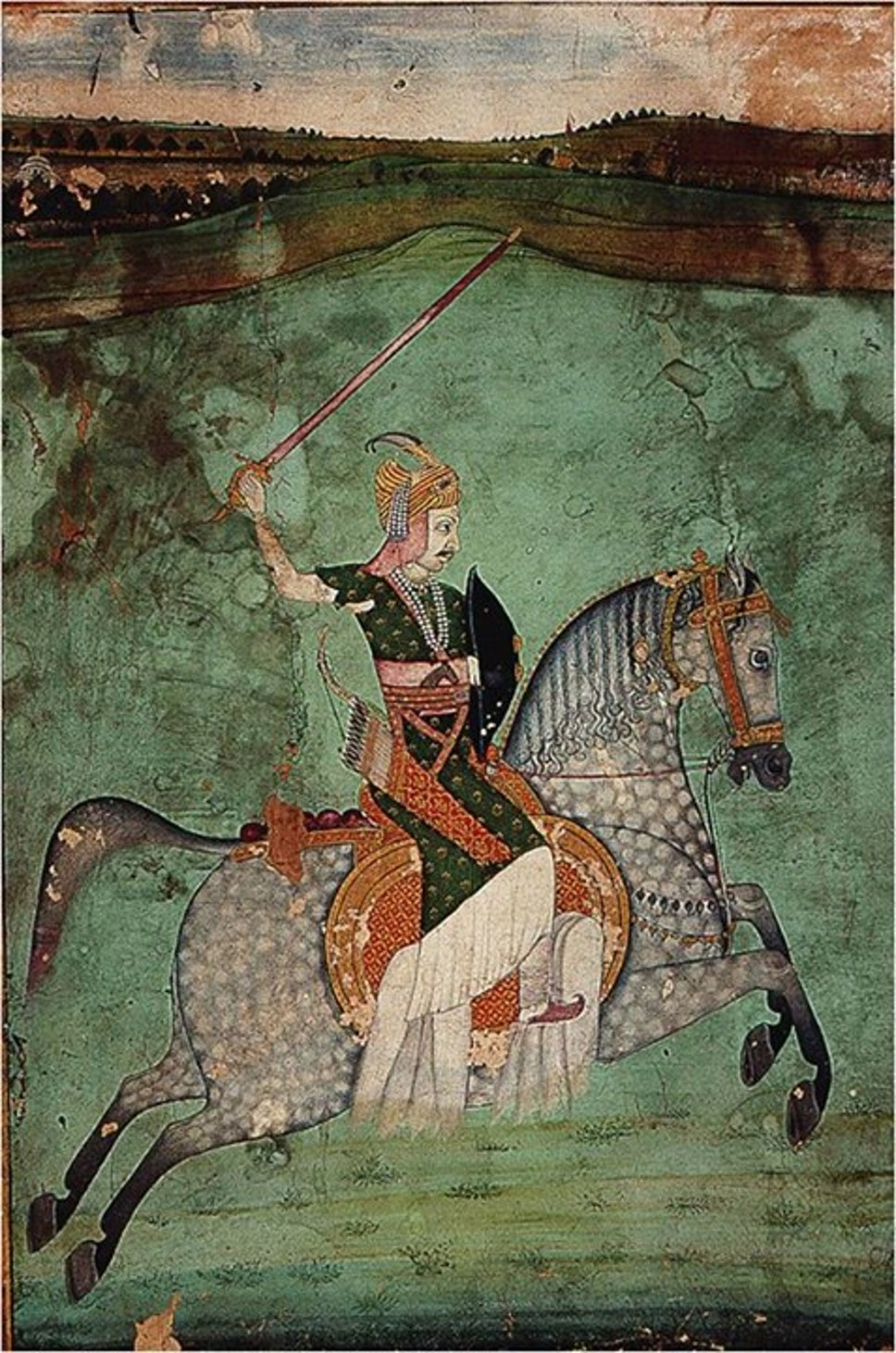
Bajirao I

Balaji married Radhabai Barve (1685–1752) and had two sons and two daughters.

- Baji Rao I (18 August 1700 – 28 April 1740), also known as Bajirao I, was a noted general who was appointed as the Peshwa by Shahu I of the Maratha Empire in 1720., He is also known as Thorale Bajirao (Bajirao the elder) in Marathi to distinguish him from his grandson and namesake, Bajirao II, the last Peshwa. Bajirao, after Shivaji, is considered to be the most charismatic and dynamic leader in Maratha history, and one of the greatest Military generals of his time. He was just twenty years old when he was appointed Peshwa, and already had a reputation for rapid decisions and a passion for military adventure.
- Chimaji Appa (1707–1741) was a son of Balaji Vishwanath Bhat and the younger brother of Peshwa Bajirao I. He was an able military commander who liberated Portuguese controlled territory north of Mumbai including Vasai fort in a hard-fought battle in 1739.
- Bhiubai – She married Abaji Joshi of Baramati, brother of the banker Balaji Naik famed as Bajirao I's "most tormenting creditor".
- Anubai – she married Venkatrao Ghorpade of Ichalkaranji. Their heirs ruled the state of Ichalkaranji until 1947.

=== Third generation ===
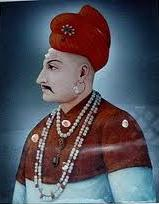
Portrait of Balaji Bajirao from 1800 century

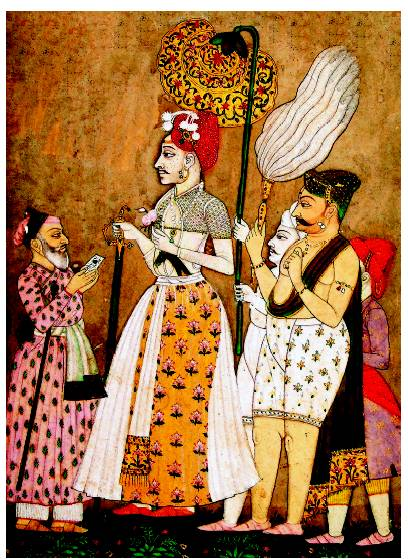
Miniature painting of Sadashivrao Bhau with Ibrahim Khan Gardi

|Bajirao was married to Kashibai Chaskar Joshi, and had two sons together: Balaji Bajirao Peshwa (Nanasaheb) who was later appointed Peshwa by Shahu in 1740. Their second son was named Raghunathrao. Bajirao also took Mastani as the second wife who was the daughter of Maharaja Chhatrasal of Panna by a Persian Muslim wife. Chimajiappa was married to Rakhmabai (Pethe family). He had only son, Sadashivrao known popularly as Sadashivrao Bhau who led the Maratha forces in the Third Battle of Panipat against Ahmad Shah Abdali. Rakhmabai died shortly after Sadashivrao's birth, which led to Chimajiappa's second marriage to Annapuurnabai. Bajirao and Mastani had a son named Shamsher Bahadur.

- Balaji Baji Rao (Nanasaheb) (8 December 1720 – 23 June 1761), also known as Nana Saheb Peshwa, was son of Bajirao and Kashibai. Chattrapati Shahu, at time of his death, appointed Balaji Baji Rao Peshwa of Maratha Empire. He contributed to development of Pune, India. Under his reign, borders of Maratha Empire crossed Peshawar (presently in Pakistan) by 1760 AD . However, he is also held responsible for defeat of Marathas at the Battle of Panipat (1761).
- Raghunathrao (b. 18 Aug.1734 – d. 11 Dec.1783) was Peshwa of the Maratha Empire from 1773 to 1774. Earlier in his career as a commander of Maratha forces, he is credited with expanding the Maratha Kingdom to include far-flung areas such as Attock in present-day Pakistan. However, he is also blamed sowing the seeds for the downfall of the Peshwa Dynasty. He is nicknamed as Ragho Bharari since he is instrumental in planting the triumphant Hindu Maratha flag till Attock in present-day Pakistan.
- Shamsher Bahadur I (Krishna Rao) (1734–1761) also spelled as Samsher Bahadur, a.k.a. Krishnasinh, was a Maratha ruler of the dominion of Banda in northern India. He was the son of Bajirao I and Mastani.
- Sadashivrao Bhau (4 August 1730 – 14 January 1761) was the son of Chimaji Appa and Rakhmabai and the nephew of Peshwa Baji Rao I. He served as the Sarsenapati (commander-in-chief) of the Maratha army at the third battle of Panipat. He died fighting at the third battle of Panipat.
- Janardan Rao who died young

=== Fourth generation ===
Sadashivrao Bhau's first wife's name was Umabai. She gave birth to two sons who died as soon. Umabai died in 1750. His second wife was Parvatibai. She accompanied Sadashivrao bhau during the battle of Panipat.

- Vishwasrao (7 March 1741 – 14 January 1761) was the eldest son of Balaji Baji Rao, Peshwa of Pune (Poona) (the prime minister and de facto ruler/administrator) of the Maratha Empire and also was the heir to the title of Peshwa of Maratha Empire. He was killed during the period of the most intense fighting (Approx. between 01pm and 02:30pm) at Third Battle of Panipat, fighting on the front lines. It is generally accepted that the third battle of Panipat, which hung in balance till his death, moved decisively in favour of the Afghans and ended up in victory of Durrani Empire.
- Madhavrao I (or Pradhanpant Shrimant Madhavrao (Ballal) Peshwa I a.k.a. Thorle Madhav Rao Peshwa ) (14 February 1745 – 18 November 1772) was the fourth Peshwa of the Maratha Empire. During his tenure, Maratha power recovered from the losses suffered during the Panipat Campaign, a phenomenon known as "Maratha Resurrection". He is considered one of the greatest personalities of the Maratha history.
- Narayan Rao (10 August 1755 – 30 August 1773) was the fifth Peshwa or ruler of the Maratha Empire from November 1772 until his murder by his palace guards in August 1773
- Baji Rao II (10 January 1775 – 28 January 1851), also Rao Pandit Pandham, was the son of Peshwa Raghunathrao and Anandibai was Peshwa of the Maratha Empire, and governed from 1796 to 1818.He was installed as the Peshwa after his nephew, Sawai Madhavrao died without leaving an heir.
- Ali Bahadur (Krishna Sinh) (1758-1802), was a Nawab of the dominion of Banda (present day Uttar Pradesh) in northern India, a vassal of Mahratta polity. He was the son of Shamsher Bahadur I (Krishna Rao) and the grandson of Bajirao I Under the auspices of the powerful Maratha nobles, Ali Bahadur established his authority over large parts of Bundelkhand and became the Nawab of Banda .Ali Bahadur supported Pune polity and fought the English in the Anglo-Maratha War of 1803

=== Fifth generation ===
- Madhavrao II (18 April 1774 – 27 October 1795) Madhavrao II or Sawai Madhavrao was the posthumous son of the murdered Narayanrao and his wife Gangabai (née Sathe).He was proclaimed Peshwa as soon as he was born with a regency council called Barbhai mandal under Nana Fadnavis ruling in his name.Sawai Madhavrao died early the age of 21 in 1795. With the treaty of Salbai, the ascendent British East India Company also recognized Sawai Madhavrao as the Peshwa.
- Nana Sahib (born 19 May 1824 – disappeared 1857), Nana Sahib was born as Nana Govind Dhondu Pant, to Narayan Bhatt and Ganga Bai. who led the during the Indian Rebellion of 1857. He was adopted son by the exiled Maratha Peshwa Baji Rao II.The Company's refusal to continue the pension after his father's death, as well as what he perceived as high-handed policies, compelled him to lead the First Indian Revolution against the British and seek freedom from company rule in India. He forced the British garrison in Kanpur to surrender, and thus gained control of Kanpur for a few days. He later disappeared, after his forces were defeated by a British force that recaptured the city. He also led the battle at Gwalior with Rani Laxmibai of Jhansi; but was unsuccessful as many Indian rulers sided with the British including the Afghans, Sikhs & Gorkhas. He disappeared after the war but there were many rumors that he was seen alive at a number of places in a period after 1857.
- Shamsher Bahadur II, Nawab of Banda 1802/1825, died 1823/1825 son of Ali Bahadur I
- Nawab Zulfikar Ali, Nawab of Banda in 1802 and 1825/1850, son of Ali Bahadur. He was married and had issue.
- Nawab Ali Bahadur II, Nawab of Banda 1850/1858, son of Ali Bahadur I.He fought with Rani Lakshmi Bai Of Jhansi Against British East India Company in 1857 Indian rebellion in Kalpi. He was married and had issue, three sons. He died 1873.
- Jagat Bahadur fl.1833 son of Ali Bahadur I

=== Present generation ===
- Descendants of Amrut Rao, the adopted son of Raghunathrao, settled in Pune after staying in Bithoor and Varanasi for some duration. Family members are still associated with temples built by Amrutrao on the banks of the Ganges in Varanasi.
- The Muslim descendants of Bajirao I and Mastani lead middle class lives, as social workers, teachers and government servants, in the cities of Indore, Sehore, and Bhopal.

== Genealogy ==
Peshwas are shown in bold.

**Balaji Vishwanath**	Radhabai
Kashibai	**Bajirao I**	Mastani	Abaji Joshi	Bhiubai	Annapurnabai	Chimaji Appa	Rakhmabai	Anubai	Venkatrao Ghorpade
**Balaji Baji Rao**	Gopikabai	Janakibai	**Raghunath Rao**	Anandibai	Shamsher Bahadur I (Krishna Rao)	Mehrambai	Umabai	Sadashivrao Bhau	Parvatibai
Vishwasrao	Radhikabai (Lakshmibai)	**Madhavrao I**	Ramabai Peshwa	**Narayan Rao**	Gangabai	**Bajirao II**	Chimaji II	Amrut Rao (adopted)	Ali Bahadur I	2 Sons
**Madhavrao II**	**Nana Sahib** (adopted)	Vinayak Rao	Shamsher Bahadur II
Ali Bahadur II

== See also ==
- Peshwa § Appointed and Hereditary Peshwas
- Maratha clan system
- Marathi people
