= Durjan Singh (ruler) =

Thakur of Maihar from 1790 to 1826

- Thakur

Thakur of Maihar
- Reign: c. 1790 – c. 1826
- Predecessor: Rajdhar Singh
- Successor: Bishan Singh
- Died: c. 1826
- Issue: Bishan Singh; Prag Das
- House: Maihar

Durjan Singh was the Thakur of Maihar from 1790 until his death in 1826.

== Biography ==
He was the younger son of Beni Singh and succeeded his eldest brother, Rajdhar Singh, to the gaddi of Maihar in 1790 when Ali Bahadur of Banda restored it to him after conquering it from his brother. When the British government occupied Bundelkhand, he executed a deed of allegiance with them in 1806, and they confirmed him in his possession. The sanad he received in 1806 was later revised in 1814.

Upon his death in 1826, his dominions were divided into two parts. His eldest son, Bishan Singh, inherited the Maihar, while his second son, Prag Das, received Bijairaghogarh.
