= Ali Bahadur =

Ali Bahadur may refer to:

- Ali Bahadur I (r. 1790–1802), ruler of the Banda State
- Ali Bahadur II (r. 1850–1858), ruler of the Banda State
