= Banda, Uttar Pradesh =

City in India

Banda
- City
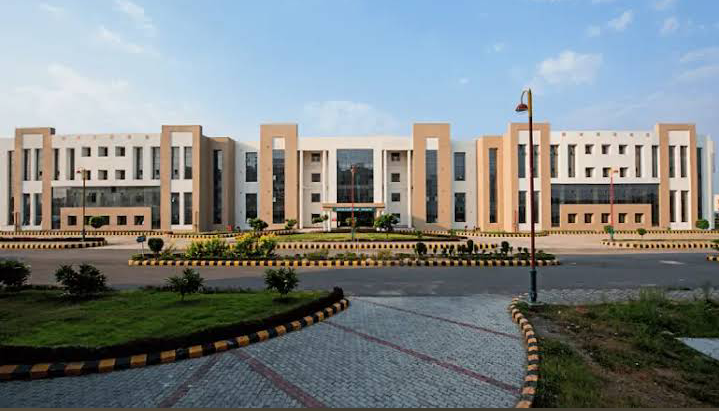
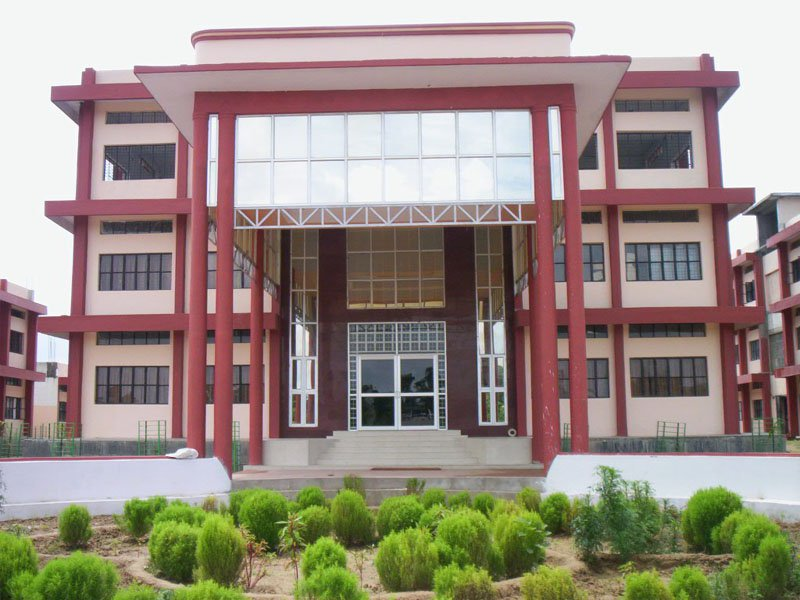
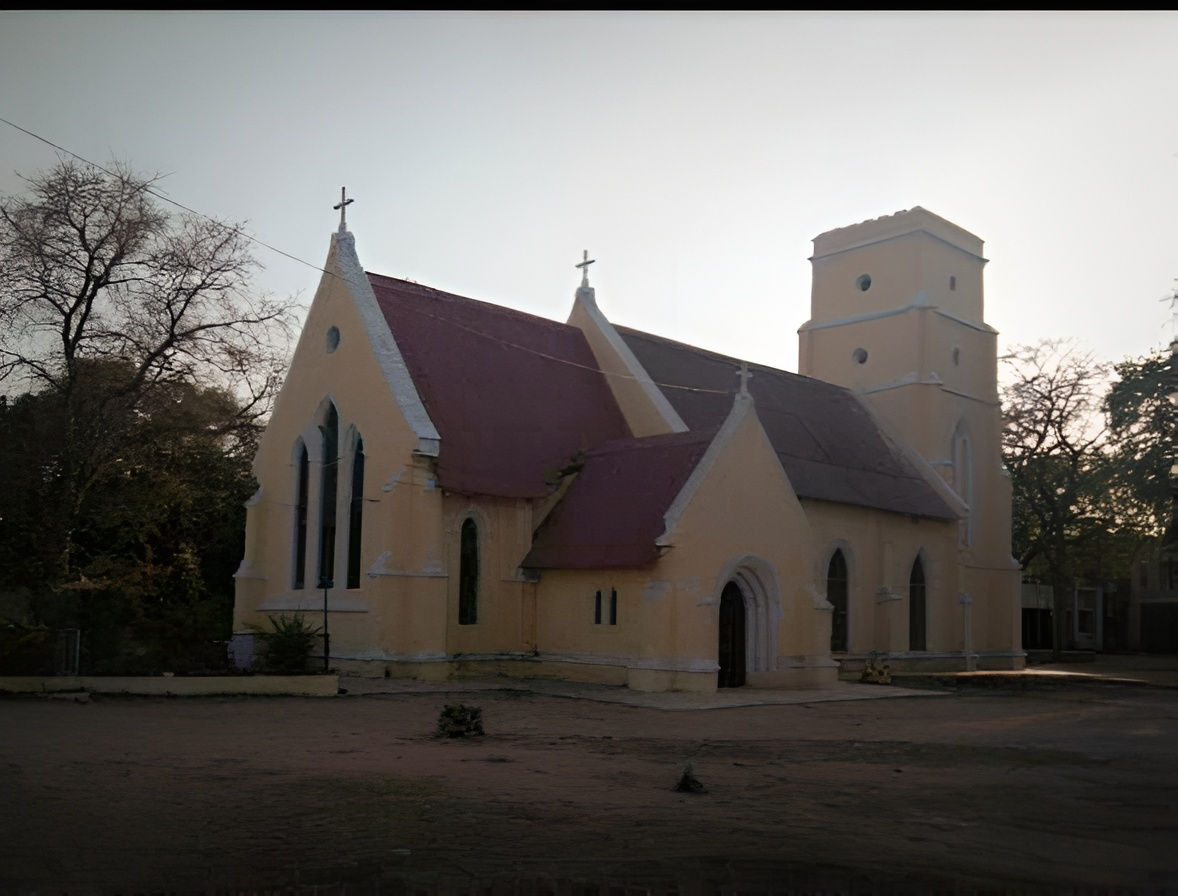
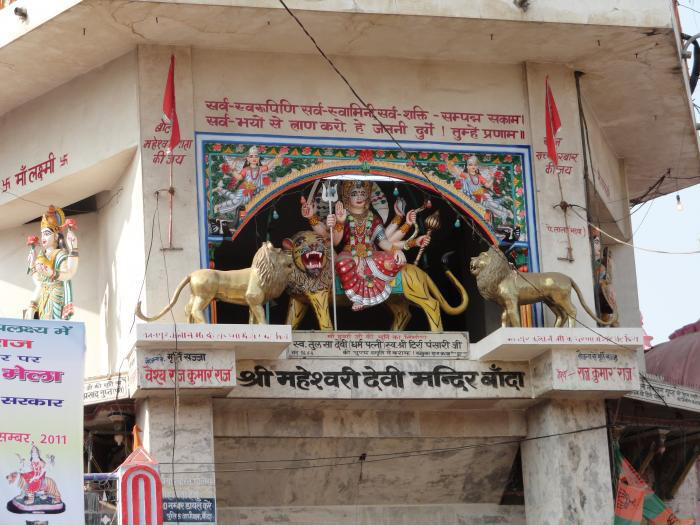
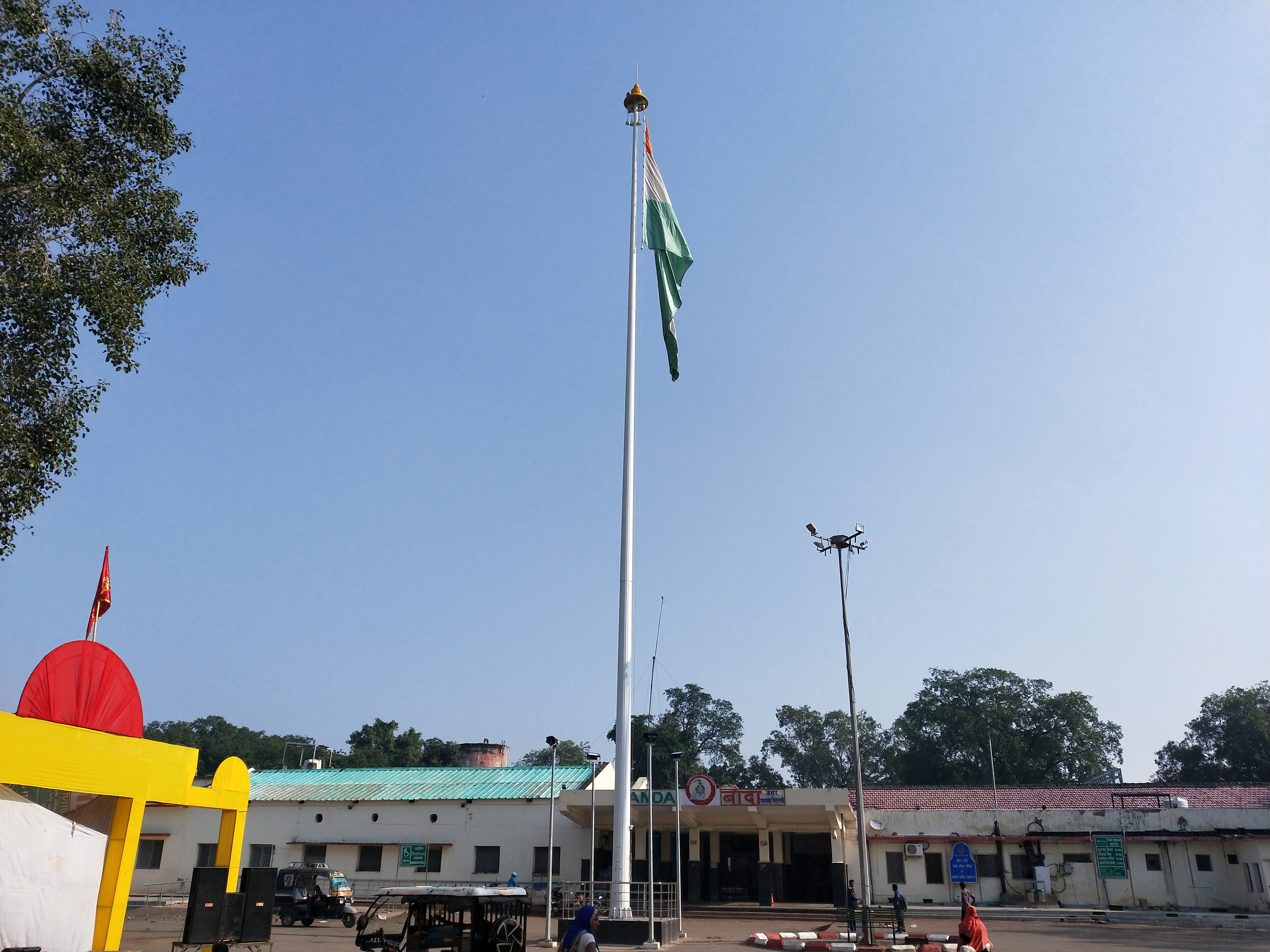
- from top: Banda Medical College, 'Kali Charan Nigam Institute of Technology, Banda, St.George's CNI Church, Maheshwari Devi Temple, Banda Railway Station

- Location within Uttar Pradesh Location within India
- Coordinates: 25°29′N 80°20′E
- Country: India
- State: Uttar Pradesh
- District: Banda

Government
  - Body: Banda Municipality Council
  - Chairman: Malati Basu (BJP)

Area
  - Total: 443.1 km^{2} (171.1 sq mi)
- Elevation: 123 m (404 ft)

Population (2011)
  - Total: 154,428
  - Density: 348.5/km^{2} (902.7/sq mi)

Language
  - Official: Hindi
  - Additional official: Urdu
  - Other: English, Bundelkhandi
- Time zone: UTC+5:30 (IST)
- PIN: 210001
- Telephone code: 91-5192
- Vehicle registration: UP-90
- Sex ratio: 881 ♂/♀
- Literacy: 82.05%
- Website: banda.nic.in

Banda is a city and a municipal board in Banda district in the state of Uttar Pradesh, India. Banda is divided among north, east, west and south Banda. Banda lies south of the Yamuna river in the Bundelkhand region. It is the administrative headquarters of Banda District. The town is well connected to major cities with railways and state highways. The town is near the right bank of the river Ken, 189 km south-west of Allahabad.

Banda was a town and district of British India, in the Allahabad division of the United Provinces. The population in 1901 was 22,565. It was formerly a military cantonment.

== History ==
Banda, which forms one of the districts included under the general name of Bundelkhand, has formed an arena of contention for the successive races who have struggled for the sovereignty of India.

Shamsher Bahadur I (Krishna Rao) was a Maratha ruler of the dominion of Banda. He was the son of Bajirao I and Mastani. He was bestowed upon a portion of his father's dominion of Banda and Kalpi. In 1761, he and his army contingent were involved (fought alongside the Peshwa) in the Third Battle of Panipat between the Marathas and Afghans. He was wounded in that battle and died a few days later at Deeg. Shamsher's successor Ali Bahadur (Krishna Singh) established his authority over large parts of Bundelkhand and became the Peshwa'a Subedar of Banda. The descendants of Shamsher Bahadur continued their allegiance towards the Maratha polity and his grandson, Shamsher Bahadur II, fought the English in the Anglo-Maratha War of 1803.

== Geography ==
=== Climate ===
Climate data for Banda, Uttar Pradesh (1991–2020, extremes 1949–2012)
Month	Jan	Feb	Mar	Apr	May	Jun	Jul	Aug	Sep	Oct	Nov	Dec	Year
Record high °C (°F)	32.8 (91.0)	38.2 (100.8)	43.0 (109.4)	47.4 (117.3)	49.0 (120.2)	49.2 (120.6)	45.6 (114.1)	42.6 (108.7)	41.6 (106.9)	40.6 (105.1)	37.4 (99.3)	32.2 (90.0)	49.2 (120.6)
Mean daily maximum °C (°F)	23.0 (73.4)	27.9 (82.2)	34.4 (93.9)	40.3 (104.5)	43.1 (109.6)	40.7 (105.3)	35.1 (95.2)	33.6 (92.5)	34.3 (93.7)	34.7 (94.5)	30.8 (87.4)	25.4 (77.7)	33.7 (92.7)
Mean daily minimum °C (°F)	8.7 (47.7)	12.0 (53.6)	17.2 (63.0)	22.6 (72.7)	26.8 (80.2)	27.9 (82.2)	26.2 (79.2)	25.6 (78.1)	24.5 (76.1)	20.3 (68.5)	14.7 (58.5)	9.9 (49.8)	19.7 (67.5)
Record low °C (°F)	0.6 (33.1)	3.2 (37.8)	7.3 (45.1)	13.1 (55.6)	17.2 (63.0)	18.8 (65.8)	16.9 (62.4)	15.7 (60.3)	14.7 (58.5)	8.8 (47.8)	2.7 (36.9)	−0.8 (30.6)	−0.8 (30.6)
Average rainfall mm (inches)	12.6 (0.50)	18.3 (0.72)	11.0 (0.43)	5.4 (0.21)	15.5 (0.61)	111.7 (4.40)	236.2 (9.30)	239.9 (9.44)	175.0 (6.89)	22.7 (0.89)	3.0 (0.12)	5.4 (0.21)	856.5 (33.72)
Average rainy days	1.2	1.6	0.8	0.6	1.4	5.3	11.5	10.9	7.2	1.3	0.3	0.4	42.4
Average relative humidity (%) (at 17:30 IST)	63	52	41	32	32	49	72	76	71	57	56	63	56
Source: India Meteorological Department

In May 2022, Banda became the hottest city in Uttar Pradesh by recording a record high temperature of 49°C. The city is said to have experienced above 45°C four times during the summer season.

== Demographics ==
As per 2011 Indian Census, Banda has a population of 154,428, out of which males are 82,116 and females are 72,312. Population in the age group of 0 to 6 years is 18,621. The total number of literates in Banda was 111,432, which constituted 72.16% of the population with male literacy of 77.4% and female literacy of 66.2%. The effective literacy rate of 7+ population of Banda was 82.1%, of which male literacy rate was 87.9% and female literacy rate was 75.4%. The sex ratio is 881. The Scheduled Castes and Scheduled Tribes had a population of 18,539 and 17 respectively. There were 27,987 households as of 2011.

=== Languages ===
Hindi and Urdu are official languages of the city. Bundeli is natively spoken in Banda.

== Government and politics ==
=== Civic administration ===
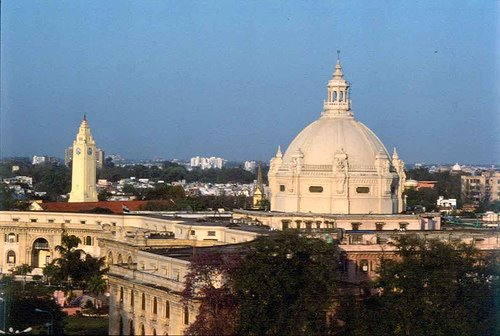
Uttar Pradesh Vidhan Sabha in Lucknow

The city elects members to the Lok Sabha as well as the Uttar Pradesh Vidhan Sabha (State Assembly). The city is under the jurisdiction of a District Magistrate, who is an IAS officer. The Collectors are in charge of property records and revenue collection for the Central Government, and oversee the national elections held in the city. The Collector is also responsible for maintaining law and order in the city. The city is administered by the Banda Municipal Corporation with executive power vested in the Municipal Commissioner of Banda, who is an administrative officer. The corporation comprises elected members (corporators elected from the wards directly by the people) with City Mayor as its head. An Assistant Municipal Commissioner oversees each ward for administrative purposes. The Banda Police is headed by a Superintendent of Police, who is an IPS officer. The Banda Police comes under the state Home Ministry. The city is divided into several police zones and traffic police zones. The Traffic Police is a semi-autonomous body under the Banda Police. The Banda Fire Brigade department is headed by the Chief Fire Officer, who is assisted by Deputy Chief Fire Officers and Divisional Officers.

== Economy ==
It contains an area of 3,061 square miles (7,930 km^{2}). In some parts it rises into irregular uplands and elevated plains, interspersed with detached rocks of granite; in others it sinks into marshy lowlands, which frequently remain under water during the rainy season. The sloping country on the bank of the Yamuna (previously called Jamuna) is full of ravines. To the south-east the Vindhya chain of hills takes its origin in a low range not exceeding 500 feet (150 m) in height, and forming a natural boundary of the district in that direction. The principal river of the district is the Yamuna, which flows from north-west to south-east, along the north-east boundary of the district, for 125 miles (201 km) The black soil of the district yields crops of which the principal are millet, other food-grains, pulse, rice, cotton and oil-seeds. Banda cotton enjoys a high repute in the market. A branch railway from Manikpur to Jhansi traverses the length of the district, which is also crossed by the East Indian main line to Jabalpur (earlier Jubbulpore).

The BDA (Banda Development Authority) has planned to make one mall in town, the India Family Mart, a mid scale shopping store, is currently giving their service to the city.

== Places of interest ==
=== Bamdeveshwar Temple and Mount ===
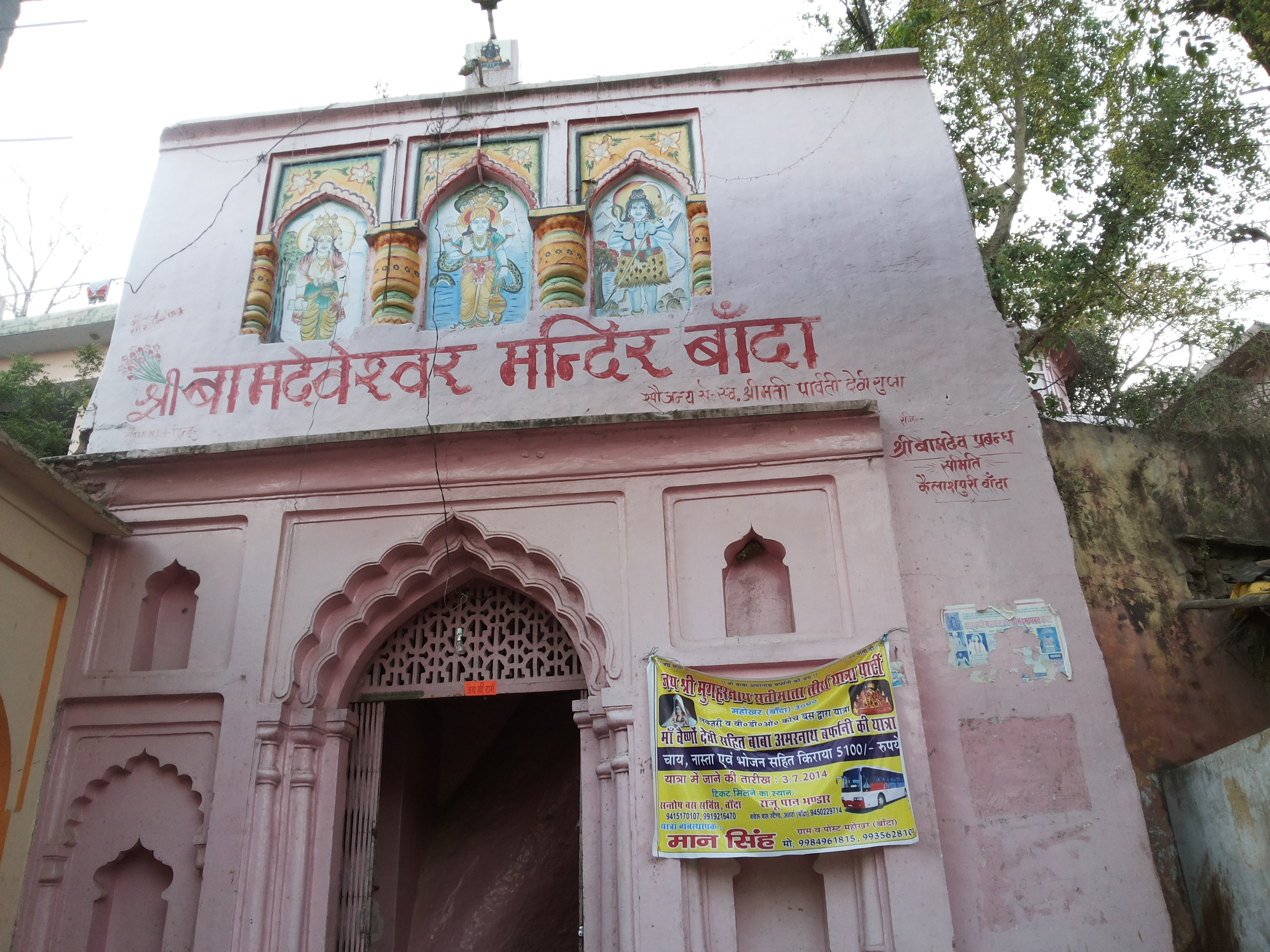
Bamdeveshwar temple

The temple is said to derive its name from Bamdeo Rishi, a sage mentioned in Hindu mythology as a contemporary of Lord Rama. Bamdeo is said to have had his hermitage at the foot of a hill. There is one big and old Shivling is situated in the temple in the kho of Bambeshar Pahar.

=== Ken River ===
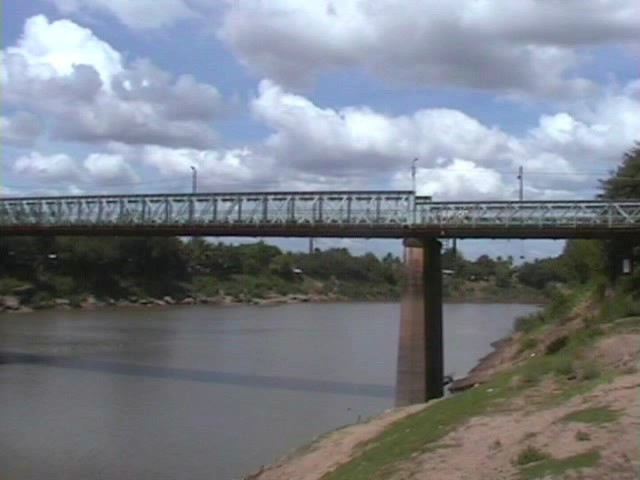
Ken river

=== Bhuragarh Fort ===
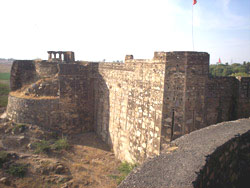
Bhuragarh fort

Across the river Ken there are ruins of Bhuragarh Fort, said to be built with brown stones by Raja Guman Singh in the 17th century. This place was important during the freedom struggle. A mela is organised in this place called ‘Natbali Ka Mela’. The fort is situated at the bank of the Ken river. The historical importance of Bhuragarh Fort is related to Bundela reign, Kirat Singh, son of Jagat Rai, repaired Bhuragarh Fort in 1746 A.D. None Arjun Singh was the caretaker of the fort.

In 1787 AD, Nawab Ali Bahudur I with the help of Kalinjar Bhatts defeated the Bundelas and captured Bhuragarh. He started a series of wars and extended his dominions from Kalpi to Kalinjar. He is called the Conqueror of Bundelkhand and his forces swayed into Orchcha and levied chauth for Peshwas of Pune. His thrust enabled Kalinjar Bhattas to march into Vindhya and defeat Rewa, Maihar, Vijayraghogargh and adjoining states. The Nawab died in 1802 A.D. and the majority of his hard earned land passed to the British.

Banda became a gun salute state and started its modern approach under Nawab Zulfikar Bahadur. He established a modern education system and helped to renew the Banda administrations. He stationed the Kalinjar Bhattshahi in front of Banda railway station, Charkhari Battshahi in Choti Bazar and Jhasi Huzur in Bhuragarh fort hence creating Banda a hub of Maratha dominionation of the North. This was the golden period of Banda when culture and language were promoted. Nawab Tank was built in memory of Mirza Ghalib, who happens to be a blood relative of Nawab. Nawab started the Shazar stone masonry works and his rule was one of the milestones in peace and Maratha hegemony.

The Indian Rebellion of 1857 started on 14 June. In Banda it was led by Nawab Ali Bahadur II. This struggle was much fiercer than expected and revolutionaries from Allahabad, Kanpur and Bihar joined the Nawab in fighting the British. On 15 June 1857, revolutionaries killed Joint Magistrate Cockrail. On 16 April 1858, Whitluck arrived in Banda and fought against the Maratha army of Banda, supported by Tatya on south and Kalinjar Bhatts from east. About 3000 revolutionaries were killed in the fort during this war. Nuts (people who perform acrobatic feats) from Sarbai sacrificed their lives in this war. Their graves are found inside the fort.

The Nawab was dismissed from his possessions in Banda, imprisoned and sent to Indore jail. All his Banda dominions were passed to RaiBahadur Manvendrasingh Awasthi, an important minister of Kalinjar bhattshahi.

=== Gudha ke Hanuman Ji ===
This temple is situated in Gudha kalan and is about 40 km from Banda.

=== Jain Mandir ===
A historical temple in Banda city. It is located near Chhoti Bazar.

=== Kalinjar Fort ===
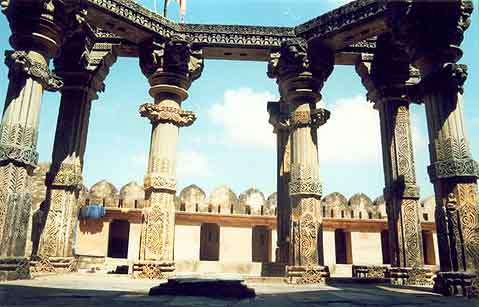
kalinjar fort

The most famous place to visit from the city is the ancient Kalinjar Fort which is located south of Banda and is mentioned in the Mahabharata.

=== Angleshwari Devi ===
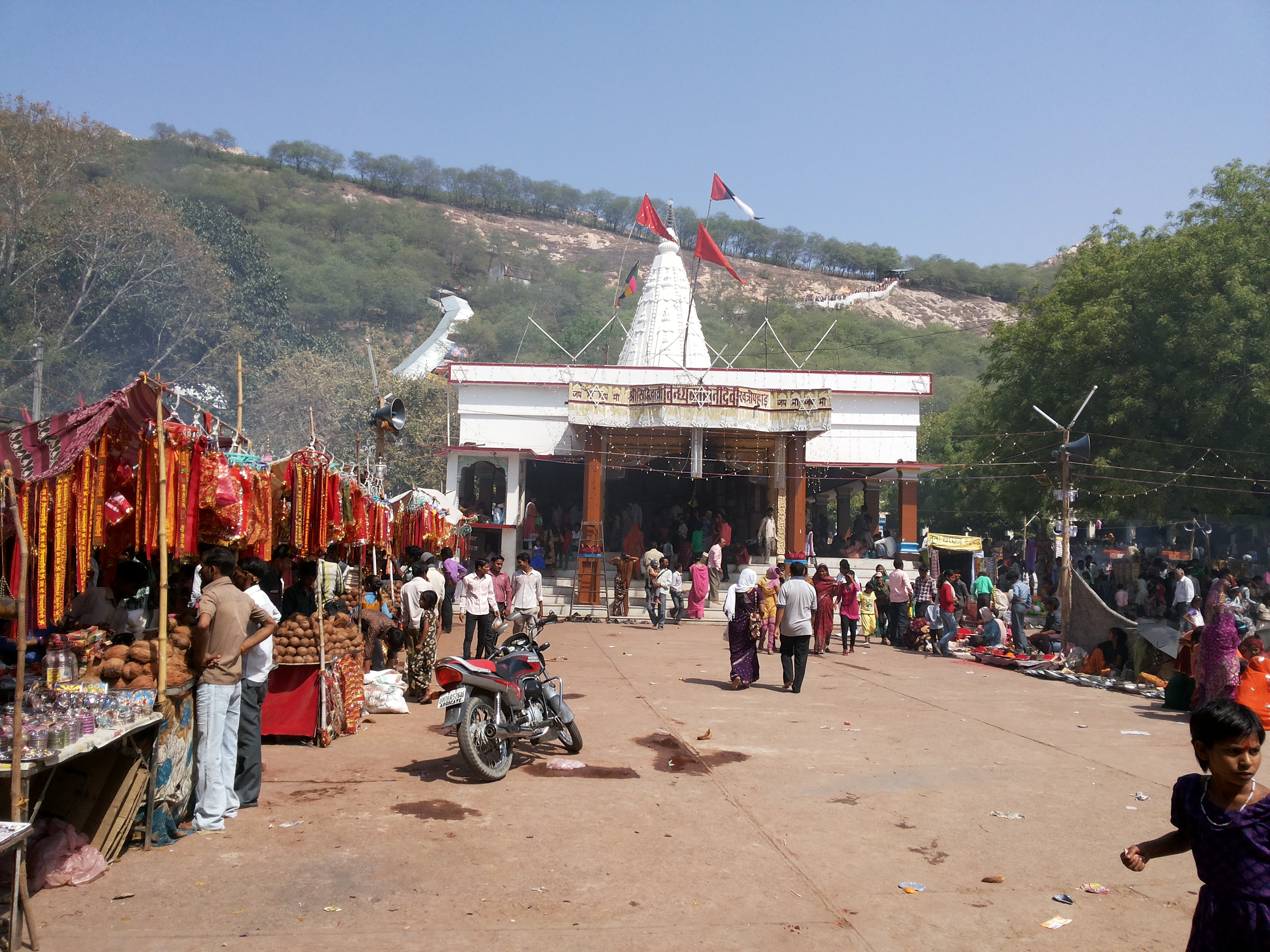
khatri pahar (Vindhyavasini) Temple

There is also a temple on the top of a hill called Khatri Pahar at Shydha, which is located approximately 24 km from the city. The temple is dedicated to goddess Angleshwari (Vindhyavasini).

=== Maheshwari Devi Temple ===
This temple is situated at the middle place of the Banda city. There are many murtis of Devis and Devatas in the temple.

=== Nawab Tank ===
Nawab Tank, which was built to fulfill the water needs in Banda, is situated about 3 km south of Banda. This tank was built by the Nawab Maghrebi of Banda, and therefore it is known as the Nawab Tank.

=== Sankat Mochan Mandir ===
This temple is situated in Kachehari Road.

=== St. George's Church (also known as Pila Girja or Yellow Church) ===
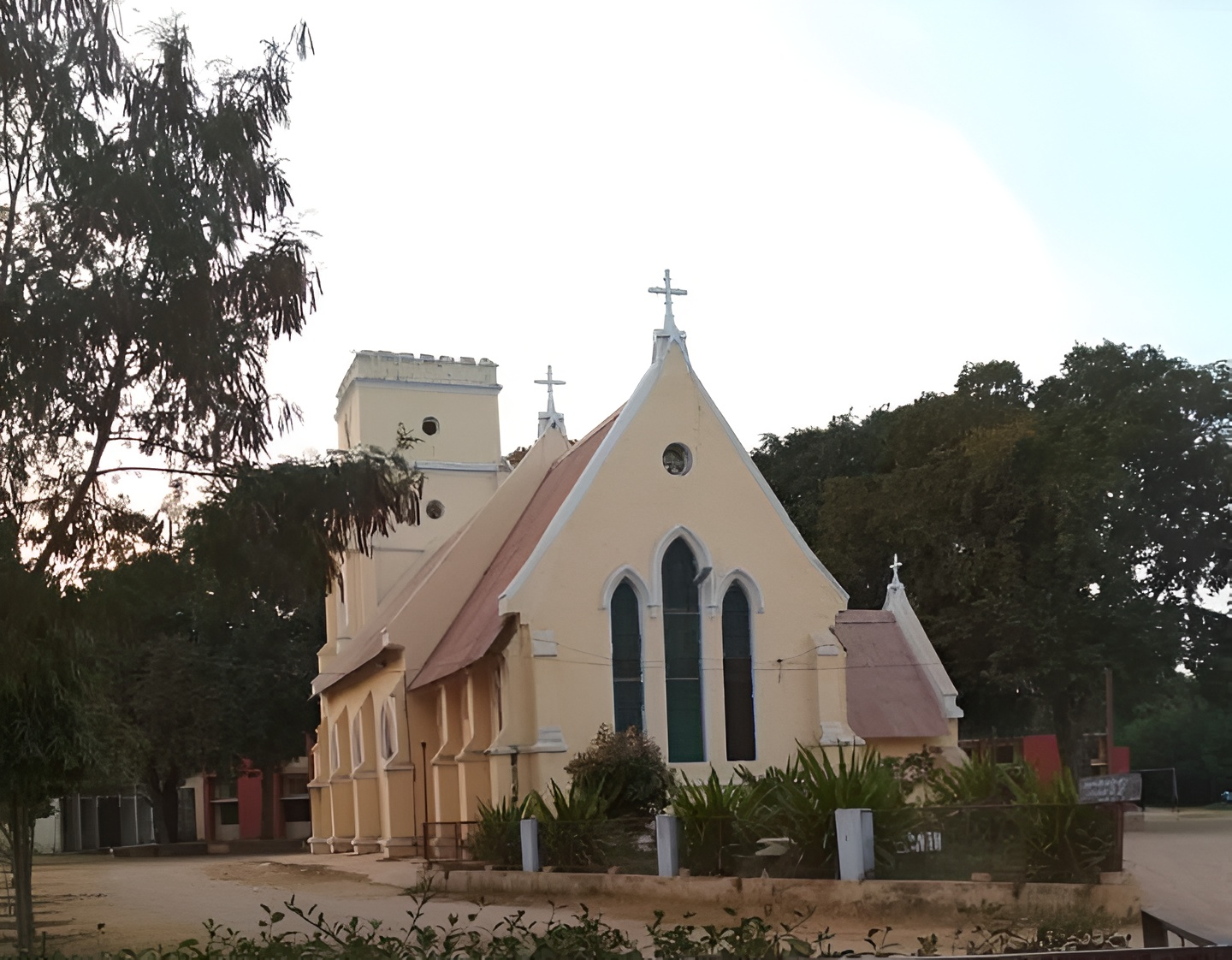
St. George's Church (also known as the Yellow Church)

St. George's Church, also known as the Yellow Church, established in 1835 AD, is the oldest church of Banda. Some records have been found that proved that Christianity was in Banda before 1809 AD. Yellow Church was built by Church of England in India for regular prayers of Anglo-Catholic (Anglican) Englishmen and their families living in Banda during British period. Earlier, the church was under the Diocese of Calcutta, but after 1893 a new Diocese of Lucknow was carved out from the Calcutta diocese. The church is dedicated to the British patron saint George the Martyr. The Church has many historic memorials of British officers who served in Banda.

=== St. Paul's Church (also known as Lal Girja or Red Church) ===
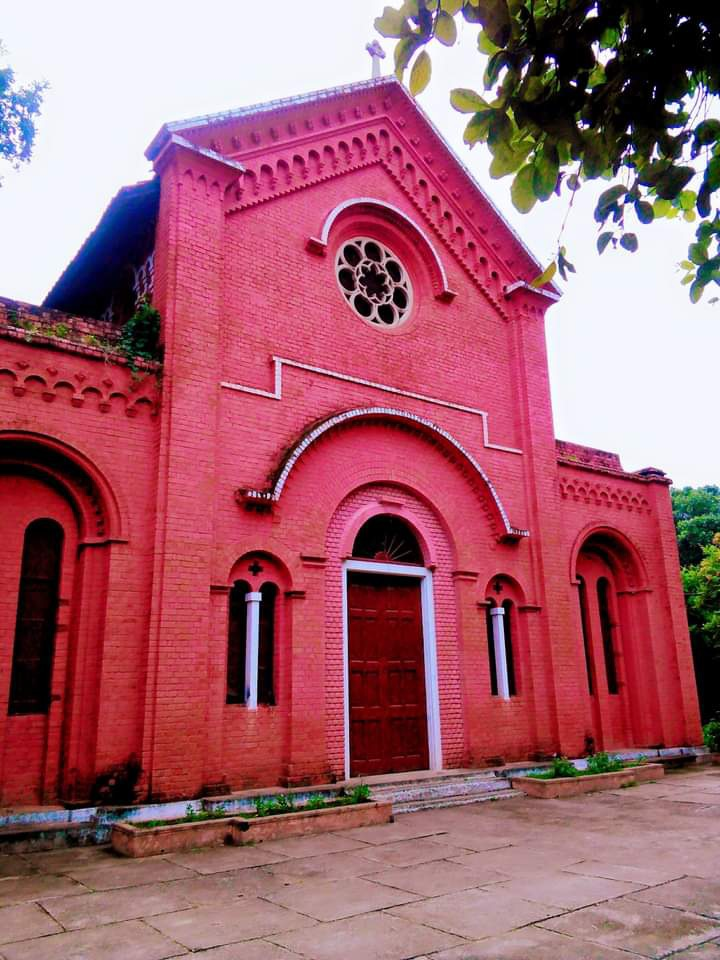
St. Paul's Church, also known as Lal Girja or Red Church

St. Paul's Church, Banda is second oldest church of Banda. This church was established in the 1911. This Gothic Revival style building can accommodate up to 250 worshipers during the time of service. This church is biggest church in the city and is the centre of worship from more than a century. The church was established to fulfil the spiritual needs of British and Indian Anglican Christians of town. St. Paul's Church is an important heritage for the district Banda, as it has seen growth of Banda from the colonial British cantonment to a developing city. The church is currently under the control of CNI diocese of Lucknow.

== Transport ==
=== Road transport ===
Public transport in the city includes taxis, cycle rickshaws and auto rickshaws. National Highway 76 (India) passes through Banda which connects it to Jhansi and Allahabad. State Highway 92 connects Banda to Fatehpur. State Highway 76 connects to Allahabad. National Highway 86 connects to Kanpur. Apart from the long-distance services, there are many services to nearby places within the state. There are a number of daily buses to Kanpur, Allahabad, Delhi, Sagar, Lucknow, Jhansi, Khajuraho, in Uttar Pradesh and to many other states.

=== Railways ===
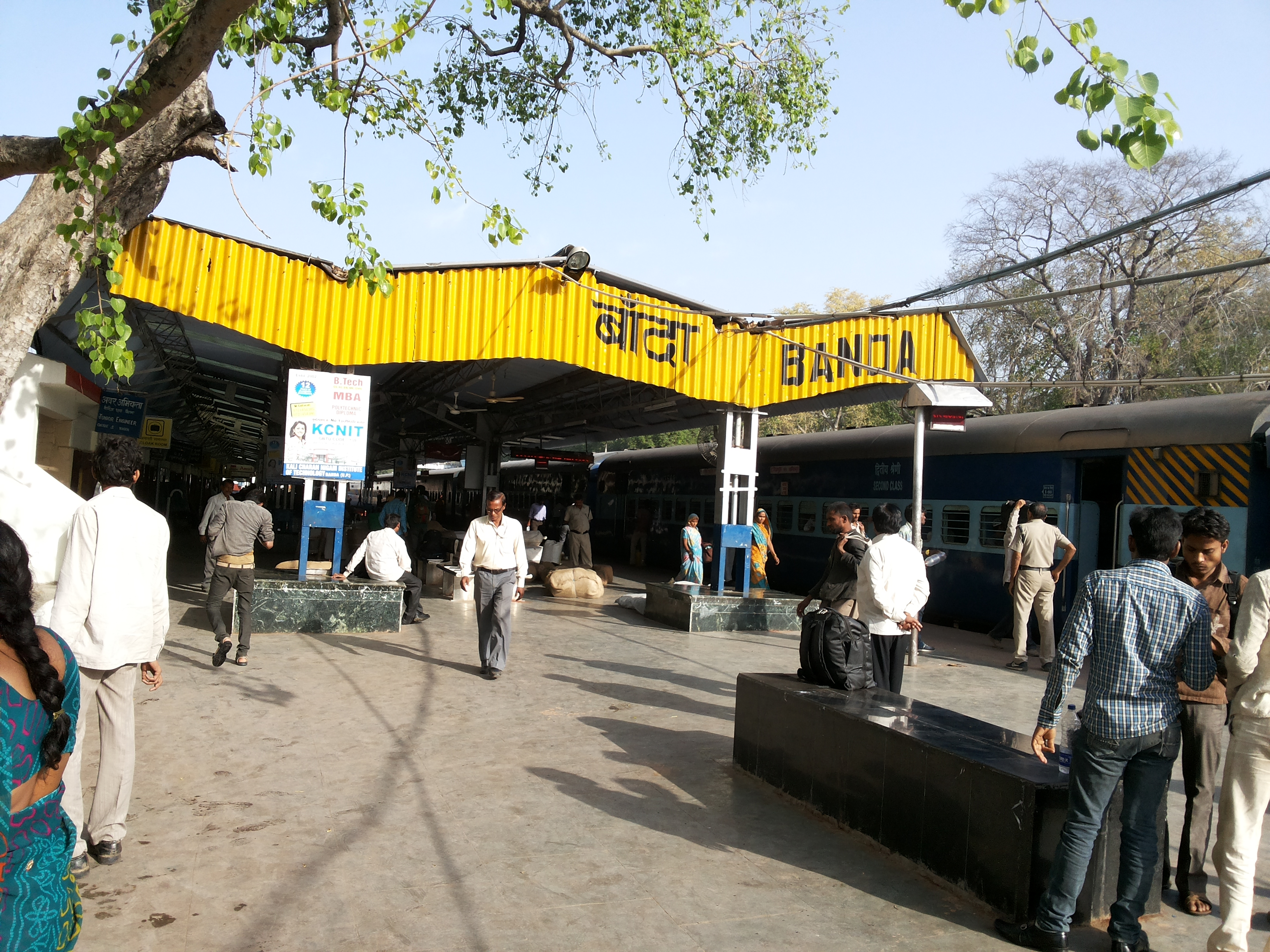
Railway station

Banda is served by Banda railway station, a Category A station, under the Jhansi railway division of the North Central Railway Zone. It is well connected by trains with all major cities namely Kolkata, Delhi, Mumbai, Lucknow, Bhopal, Bilaspur, Gwalior, Jabalpur, Raipur, Varanasi, Agra. The city is well connected to Kanpur, Allahabad, Jhansi, and other neighbouring cities.

The electrification of railway line was completed in 2019.

== Education ==
- Government Medical College, Banda is a state medical college in Banda.
- Rani Durgavati Medical College, Banda, Banda
