= Aman Singh Judeo =

Raja of Panna (1752–1758)

- Raja

Raja of Panna
- Reign: c. 1752 – c. 1758
- Predecessor: Sabha Singh
- Successor: Hindupat Singh
- Died: c. 1758
- House: Panna
- Dynasty: Bundela
- Father: Sabha Singh

Aman Singh Judeo was the Raja of Panna from 1752 until his death in 1758.

== Biography ==
Upon the death of his father, Sabha Singh, in 1752, he ascended the throne of Panna. He was not the eldest son but was beloved by his father and ascended the throne according to his father’s wishes. The durbar of the Peshwa of Poona recognized him and secured an agreement from him to pay Rs. 625,000. His succession led to dissension within his family. He constructed a temple at Chitrakoot and the parikrama (transl. a circular pathway) around Kamadgiri.

He was murdered in 1758 by his brother, Hindupat, with the aid of Beni Singh. The Gonds of the Dang-Charhas family in Chhattisgarh, who previously lived in Panna and were patronized by him, sang a song lamenting his death. He is still remembered for his lavish generosity. Among other gifts, he allotted territory worth one lakh for the Raj Bhog of the Chitrakoot temples. He was succeeded by his brother, Hindupat Singh.
