= Bishan Singh of Maihar =

Thakur of Maihar from 1826 to 1850

Bishan Singh
- Thakur

Kushwaha Thakur of Maihar
- Reign: c. 1826 – c. 1850
- Predecessor: Durjan Singh
- Successor: Mohan Prasad
- Died: c. 1850
- Issue: Mohan Prasad
- House: Maihar
- Father: Durjan Singh

Bishan Singh was the Thakur of Maihar from 1826 until his death in 1850.

== Biography ==
Upon the death of his father, Durjan Singh, in 1826, his dominions were divided into two portions: Maihar and Bijairaghogarh. Bishan Singh received the former, while his brother, Prag Das, got the latter. Over time, he fell into serious debt and requested the British in 1849 to place his state under their management. He died a year later in 1850, and was succeeded by his son, Mohan Prasad, to his title, rank, and dignity.
