= Dhokal Singh =

Raja of Panna (1785–1798)

- Raja

Raja of Panna
- Reign: c. 1785 – c. 1798
- Predecessor: Anirudh Singh
- Successor: Kishor Singh
- Died: c. 1798
- Issue: Kishor Singh
Names
- Dhokal Singh Ju Deo
- House: Panna
- Dynasty: Bundela
- Father: Hindupat Singh

Dhokal Singh was the Raja of Panna from 1785 until his death in 1798.

== Biography ==
He was the youngest of three sons of Hindupat Singh. After the death of his brother, Anirudh Singh in 1779, he was installed on the throne of Panna by Beni Singh and Khemraj in 1785. They installed him because he was a minor, which allowed them to wield power during his minority. Following this, a struggle for the throne of Panna ensued between him and his brother, Sarnet Singh. In the course of this conflict, a battle took place at Gathewara, where his benefactor, Beni Singh, was killed by the forces of Arjun Singh, who was aiding Sarnet. When Mahadji Scindia sent Laxman Hari Newalkar to collect arrears due from Panna, he dispatched his Diwan, Rajdhar Singh, who defeated Newalkar in November 1790. During his reign, the whole of Bundelkhand fell prey to Himmat Bahadur and Ali Bahadur, a grandson of Bajirao Peshwa. Ali asserted his suzerainty over all rulers of the region and defeated him in his campaign, forcing Singh to flee to Kalinjar. He later received a sanad from Ali Bahadur.

He died in 1798, and his son, Kishor Singh, succeeded him on the throne of Panna.
