= Bijairaghogarh =

- 1826–1858
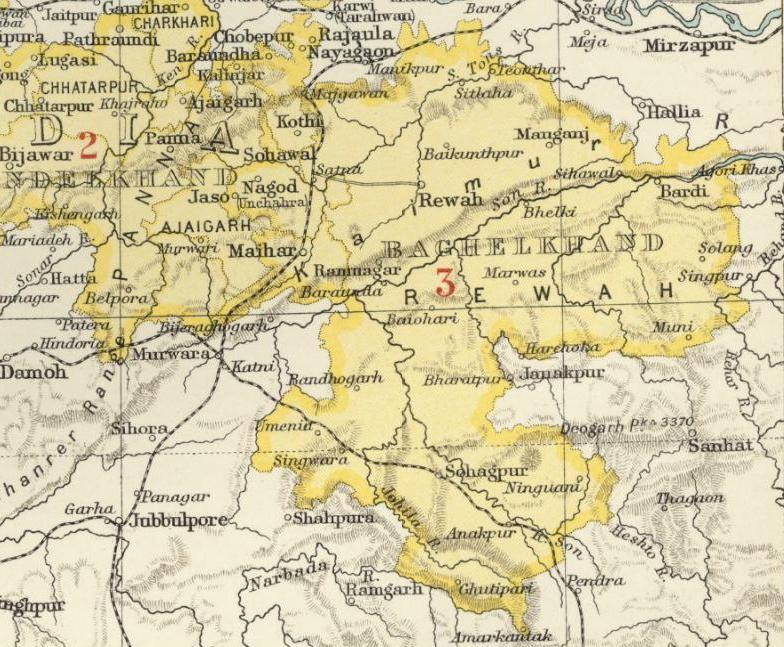
- Bijairaghogarh and neighbouring regions
- Status: Princely state under the protection of the British Raj (1826–1857) Independent state in rebellion against the British Raj (1857–1858)
- History
  - Established: 1826
  - Disestablished after the Revolt of 1857: 1858
- Today part of: India

Bijairaghogarh (or Vijayraghavgarh) was a princely state in India. It was disestablished due to its participation in the Indian Rebellion of 1857.

== History ==
Durjan Singh, the Thakur of Maihar, had two sons: Bishan Singh and Prag Das. After his death in 1826, his territory was divided into two parts. His eldest son, Bishan Singh, succeeded him as the Thakur of Maihar, while his younger son, Prag Das, was granted Bijairaghogarh. The state first came into contact with the East India Company when, through a sanad on 29 February 1828, it recognized Prag Das as the ruler of Bijairaghogarh.

It was confiscated in 1858 by the East India Company due to the involvement of its Thakur, Surju Prasad, in the Revolt of 1857. Upon its confiscation, the then ruler of Maihar claimed that since it had originally been part of Maihar, it should be returned to him. However, his claim was rejected, and in 1865, it was incorporated into the territories administered by the Chief Commissioner of the Central Provinces. But, due to the valuable services rendered to the British by the ruler of Maihar in 1857, he was granted 11 villages from the confiscated state in 1859.

== Rulers ==
Like the ruling house of Maihar, the rulers of Bijairaghogarh claimed descent from Beni Singh, a grandson of Thakur Bhim Singh, who served under the renowned Chhatarsal. They claimed that their ancestors migrated from Alwar between the 17th and 18th centuries and were granted land by the ruler of Orchha. They claimed to be Rajputs of the Kachhwaha clan. However, no evidence supported this claim.

=== Thakurs ===
Name	Reign began	Reign ended
Prag Das	1826	1845
Surju Prasad	1845	1858

== See also ==
- Maihar State
- List of princely states of British India (alphabetical)
- List of princely states of British India (by region)
