= Randhir Singh (ruler) =

Raja of Maihar (1910 – 1911)

- Raja

Raja of Maihar
- Reign: 18 July 1910 – 15 December 1911
- Predecessor: Jadubir Singh
- Successor: Brijnath Singh
- Born: 19 October 1865
- Died: 15 December 1911 (aged 46)
- House: Maihar
- Father: Raghubir Singh

Randhir Singh was the Raja of Maihar from 1910 until his death in 1911.

== Biography ==
He was born the second son of Raghubir Singh on 19 October 1865. Following the death of his elder brother, Jadubir Singh, on 18 July 1910, he succeeded him as the Raja of Maihar. However, he was formally installed on 7 January 1911. He was invited to attend the Delhi Durbar of 1911 but declined due to financial reasons. He married and had three sons: Brijnath Singh, Yadunath Singh, and Brijdev Singh.

He was murdered in Maihar on 15 December 1911 and was succeeded by his son, Brijnath Singh, as the Raja of Maihar.
