= Sabha Singh =

Raja of Panna from 1739 to 1752

- Raja

Raja of Panna
- Reign: 6 February 1739 – 28 May 1752
- Predecessor: Harde Sah
- Successor: Aman Singh
- Died: 28 May 1752
- Issue: Aman Singh; Hindupat Singh; Khet Singh
- House: Panna
- Dynasty: Bundela
- Father: Harde Sah

Sabha Singh (died 28 May 1752), also known as Sobhag Singh, was the Raja of Panna from 1739 until his death in 1752.

== Biography ==
Being the eldest of his father’s nine sons, Sabha Singh succeeded his father, Harde Sah, as the Raja of Panna upon his death on 6 February 1739. During his reign, the diamond mines of Panna were exploited for the first time. During his time, the state of Panna was severely weakened by war. This led to significant territorial losses as many powerful nobles established independent chieftainships within its borders.

He died on 28 May 1752. His cenotaph stands in the village of Senia, Chhatarpur. He left behind three sons: Aman Singh, Hindupat Singh, and Khet Singh. Since Sabha loved Aman the most among his sons and considered him the most competent, he decreed during his lifetime that Aman should succeed him on the throne. Accordingly, Aman became the Raja of Panna after his death.
