= Jadubir Singh =

Raja of Maihar (1908 – 1910)

- Raja

Raja of Maihar
- Reign: 4 March 1908 – 18 July 1910
- Investiture: 17 June 1908
- Predecessor: Raghubir Singh
- Successor: Randhir Singh
- Born: August 1864
- Died: 18 July 1910 (aged 45)
- House: Maihar
- Father: Raghubir Singh

Jadubir Singh was the Raja of Maihar from 1908 until his death in 1910.

== Biography ==
He was born in August 1864 to Raghubir Singh. Upon his father's death on 4 March 1908, he succeeded him as the Raja of Maihar. However, it was not until 17 June 1908 that Henry Daly, the then Agent to the Governor-General in Central India, formally installed him with full powers. He agreed to consult the Political Agent on all important matters related to the state.

He died on 18 July 1910 and was succeeded by his brother, Randhir Singh, as the Raja of Maihar.
