= Anirudh Singh Judeo =

Raja of Panna (1777–1779)

- Raja

Raja of Panna
- Reign: c. 1777 – c. 1779
- Predecessor: Hindupat Singh
- Successor: Dhokal Singh
- Died: c. 1779
- House: Panna
- Dynasty: Bundela
- Father: Hindupat Singh

Anirudh Singh Judeo was the Raja of Panna from 1777 until his death in 1779.

== Biography ==
Anirudh was born to Hindupat Singh and his first wife. Although he was his father's second son, his father had superseded his eldest son, Sarnet Singh, in the right to succeed him and appointed him as the heir to the throne of Panna. Upon the death of his father in 1777, he succeeded him as the Raja of Panna while still a minor. Owing to his minority, the administration of state affairs was entrusted to Beni Singh and Khemraj Chaube. When Colonel Leslie and his army, sent by Warren Hastings to support Raghoba Dada's claim as the Peshwa of the Maratha Confederacy, entered Bundelkhand in 1778, Anirudh opposed them and resisted their advance. Leslie was supported by his brother, Sarnet Singh. Anirudh fought against Leslie at Mausahaniya, near Chhatarpur, but was defeated on 10 July 1778.

Both of his regents were ambitious and their rivalry led the state into civil war. Khemraj took up arms for Sarnet and fought against Beni, who was advancing Anirudh's case near Chitrakoot. In this battle, Khemraj was victorious. However, when Anirudh died in 1779, they both reconciled and installed his younger brother, Dhokal Singh, as the Raja of Panna.
