= Rani Durgavati Medical College, Banda =

Medical college in Banda, Uttar Pradesh, India

Coordinates: 25.43789236°N 80.3516543°E

Rani Durgavati Medical College Banda
- Type: State Medical College
- Established: 2016; 10 years ago
- Academic affiliations: Atal Bihari Vajpayee Medical University (2021-present) *King George's Medical University (2019-2021)
- Principal: Dr. Sushil Kaushal
- Undergraduates: 100(MBBS) students every year from 2016
- Postgraduates: 13 (MD) students every year
- Location: Banda, Uttar Pradesh, India
- Campus: Urban
- Acronym: GMC Banda
- Website: gmcbanda.ac.in

Rani Durgavati Medical College Banda formerly known as Government Allopathic Medical College, Banda is a state medical college located in Banda, Uttar Pradesh, India. The institute was permitted for 100 M.B.B.S. seats by Medical Council of India (MCI) in .

== See also ==
- Rajarshi Dashrath Autonomous State Medical College, Ayodhya
- Maharshi Vashishtha Autonomous State Medical College, Basti
