= Brijnath Singh =

Raja of Maihar from 1911 to 1968

- Raja

Raja of Maihar
- Reign: 15 December 1911 – 13 October 1968
- Coronation: 16 December 1911
- Investiture: 2 January 1917
- Predecessor: Randhir Singh
- Successor: Govind Singh Ju Deo
- Born: 22 February 1886
- Died: 13 October 1968 (aged 82)
- Wives: Kausalya Devi; Surendra Kumari Devi; Tej Kumari
- Issue: Govind Singh Ju Deo; Ram Chandra Singh; Mahendra Kumari Devi; Narayan Singh Ju Deo; Rajendra Kumari; Narendra Kumari; Devendra Kumari; Pushpendra Kumari; Chandraprabha Kumari
- Father: Randhir Singh

Sir Brijnath Singh KCIE was the Raja of Maihar from 1911 until his death in 1968.

== Early life, family, and education ==
He was born on 22 February 1886 to Randhir Singh, the Raja of Maihar. He received his education at Daly College in Indore. He first married, in February 1915, Kausalya Devi, daughter of Daulatsinhji, the Thakore of Dhrol. His second marriage took place in 1920, to Surendra Kumari Devi, daughter of Maharaj Chhatar Singh of Semlia, a dependency of Sailana. His third wife was Tej Kumari. His children were: Govind Singh Ju Deo, Ram Chandra Singh, Mahendra Kumari Devi, Narayan Singh Ju Deo, Rajendra Kumari, Narendra Kumari, Devendra Kumari, Pushpendra Kumari, and Chandraprabha Kumari.

Singh's son, Govind Singh, married Yadhuvansh Kumari, the daughter of Maharaja Bhupinder Singh of Patiala.

== Patronage of Ustad Alauddin Khan and the Rise of the Maihar Gharana ==
In the early 20th century, Ustad Alauddin Khan arrived in Maihar in a penniless state after years of musical pursuit and hardship. He was given shelter by Suraj Sahai Saxena, a local music enthusiast, who supported him for nearly two years while Khan practiced outside the Sharada Devi temple. Eventually, Suraj's cousin, Chimmanlal Saxena, who was the Dewan (Prime Minister) of Maihar State, introduced him to Maharaja Brijnath Singh.

Recognizing his brilliance, Brijnath Singh appointed Alauddin Khan as the court musician of Maihar in 1907. With the Maharaja’s support, Khan established the foundation of the Maihar Gharana—a new lineage in Hindustani classical music that combined elements of dhrupad, khayal, and instrumental innovation. During this period, he trained several disciples who went on to become some of India’s most respected musicians.

Under Brijnath Singh’s patronage, Khan also founded the Maihar Band, a unique orchestra composed mainly of orphaned children. The Maharaja provided essential support, including instruments, salaries, and rehearsal facilities. The band blended Indian and Western instruments and served as a rare example of socially conscious court patronage in music.

Brijnath Singh is also credited with naming Khan’s daughter Annapurna Devi, who later became a legendary surbahar player and a key figure in the transmission of Indian classical music in the 20th century.

Alauddin Khan’s disciples trained in Maihar included Ravi Shankar, Ali Akbar Khan, Nikhil Banerjee, Annapurna Devi, and Pannalal Ghosh, among others. Their global success helped elevate the Maihar Gharana into one of the most influential schools of Indian classical music.

Maharaja Brijnath Singh is also believed to have had a personal interest in music and reportedly studied vocal music under Alauddin Khan himself.

== Reign ==
Upon his father's murder on 15 December 1911, he succeeded him as the Raja of Maihar and was installed on the throne the next day, 16 December 1911. As he was a minor at the time, the administration of the state was carried out by the Dewan on his behalf under the supervision of the Political Agent in Baghelkhand. He was invested with full ruling powers on 2 January 1917. On 14 August 1947, he signed the instrument of accession, through which he acceded his state to the Dominion of India.

== Death ==
He died on 13 October 1968.

== Honours ==
He was made Knight Commander of the Order of the Indian Empire on 3 June 1935.

Country	Year	Honour	Class/Grade	Ribbon	Post-nominal letters
United Kingdom	1911	Order of the Indian Empire	Knight Commander		KCIE
