= Surju Prasad =

Thakur of Bijairaghogarh (1845 – 1865)

- Thakur

Thakur of Bijairaghogarh
- Reign: c. 1845 – c. 1858
- Predecessor: Prag Das
- Successor: State confisticated by EIC
- Died: c. 1865
- Father: Prag Das

Surju Prasad was the Thakur of Bijairaghogarh from 1845 until his death in 1858.

== Biography ==
He was born to Prag Das and, upon his father's death in 1845, succeeded him as the Thakur of Bijairaghogarh. At the time of his accession, he was only five years old. Due to his minority, Bijairaghogarh was placed under the court of wards. When the Indian Rebellion of 1857 broke out against the rule of the East India Company, he was seventeen, and his state was still under the management of the Deputy Commissioner of Jabalpur. By this time, he had become an expert horse rider and had learned to wield swords and use guns. By late October 1857, as the public remained unsettled by events in Jabalpur following the execution of Raja Shankar Shah, he rose in revolt. He with the support of his relatives, including those of Kanchanpur and Chaura, raised an army of 3,000 well-trained soldiers. He was later joined by the Rajas of Shahgarh, Bakhtbali, and many other chiefs. He killed Mir Sabit Ali, a tehsildar, and his kinsmen in Maihar, then began robbing travelers on the Great Deccan Road. He had the postal horses captured, and a large body of armed men secured strategic points along the Jabalpur-Mirzapur road so that neither mail nor travelers could pass. He had bamboo barriers set up at village entrances, guarded by sepoys. Officials fluent in Persian, Hindi, and English searched travelers for documents. In January 1858, the British, aided by the forces of Raghuraj Singh, Maharaja of Rewa, marched against him. The British captured the fort of Bijairaghogarh and immediately dismantled it. Bijairaghogarh was placed under the charge of Osborne, the then Political Agent for Bundelkhand. He managed to escape with a group of loyal followers and wandered in disguise as a fakir. However, in 1864, he was captured by the British and taken to Jabalpur, where he was confined. He was sentenced to life transportation and all his property was confiscated. While in confinement, he preferred death to dishonor and committed suicide with a dagger in 1865.
