= Raghubir Singh of Maihar =

Ruler of Maihar from 1852 to 1908

Raghubir Singh
- Raja

Raja of Maihar
- Reign: c. 1852 – 4 March 1908
- Predecessor: Mohan Prasad
- Successor: Jadubir Singh
- Born: c. 1843
- Died: 4 March 1908
- Issue: Jadubir Singh; Randhir Singh; Brajbir Singh
- House: Maihar
- Father: Mohan Prasad
- Education: Agra College

Raghubir Singh was the ruler of Maihar from 1852 until his death in 1908.

== Early life, family, and education ==
He was born in 1843 to Mohan Prasad, the Thakur of Maihar. He received his education at Agra College. He married and had three sons: Jadubir Singh, Randhir Singh, and Brajbir Singh.

== Reign ==
Following his father's death in 1852, he succeeded him as the Thakur of Maihar. Owing to his minority, the management of the state was placed under the supervision of a British officer, with a promise that once he reached the age of majority, he would be restored to power. The officer also instructed him in his duties as a ruler. He was granted full administrative powers on 2 December 1865. The British government conferred on him the title of Raja as a hereditary distinction on 2 December 1869. On 1 January 1877, he was also granted a personal distinction of a nine-gun salute, which was made hereditary in 1878.

== Death ==
He died in Varanasi on 4 March 1908 and was succeeded by his eldest son, Jadubir Singh, as the Raja of Maihar.
