= Mohan Prasad =

Thakur of Maihar (1850 – 1852)

- Thakur

Thakur of Maihar
- Reign: c. 1850 – c. 1852
- Predecessor: Bishan Singh
- Successor: Raghubir Singh
- Died: c. 1852
- Issue: Raghubir Singh
- House: Maihar
- Father: Bishan Singh

Mohan Prasad was the Thakur of Maihar from 1850 until his death in 1852.

== Biography ==
Upon his father Bishan Singh's death in 1850, he succeeded him as the Thakur of Maihar. However, his reign was short-lived, as he died in 1852, and his son, Raghubir Singh, inherited his title, rank, and dignity as a minor.
