= Beni Singh =

Thakur of Maihar from 1770 to 1788

- Thakur

Thakur of Maihar
- Reign: c. 1770 – 4 July 1788
- Predecessor: Position established
- Successor: Rajdhar Singh
- Died: 4 July 1788
- House: Maihar

Beni Singh (sometimes Beni Hazuri, Beeny Huzzoory or Benny Huzzcory) was the Thakur of Maihar from 1770 until his death in 1788.

== Biography ==
Singh was the grandson of Bhim Singh, who served under Chhatrasal. He began his career from humble beginnings. Hindupat Singh, the Raja of Panna, appointed him as his Diwan and granted him Maihar as a jagir in 1770. Hindupat also conferred upon him the title of Rais.

Upon the death of Hindupat Singh, he and Khemraj became the guardians of the minor Anirudh Singh, whom Hindupat had named as his successor to the throne of Panna, bypassing his eldest son, Sarnet Singh. Meanwhile, he made Maihar independent of Panna suzerainty. When Col. Leslie fell at Chhatarpur in 1778, his successor, Col. Goddard, sought permission from Beni to pass through Panna, but Beni refused. Goddard later obtained permission from Khemraj.

Both he and Khemraj were ambitious and warlike, and it did not take long for them to fall out. Each of them wanted sole control over Panna, but Beni held the upper hand in state affairs. The rivalry between them not only caused strife and tension in Panna but also fostered jealousy and distrust among the rulers across Bundelkhand, leading to a series of wars of succession throughout the region. Each ruler, whether of Panna, Charkhari, Jaitpur, or Banda, aspired to bring about the ruin of the others. Khemraj took up arms in support of Sarnet, fought Beni near Chitrakoot, and defeated him. However, when Anirudh died, they set aside their differences and backed Dhokal Singh’s succession to the throne of Panna. As he was a minor, they could wield power during his minority.

When Sarnet Singh sought the help of Arjun Singh, a renowned warrior and general who was the guardian of Bakht Singh (or Madhukar Shah) of Banda, Arjun readily set out to fight on his behalf. His forces and those of Arjun Singh confronted each other at Gathewara near Chhatarpur. His army comprised 7,000 cavalry, 1,000 infantry, and two battalions with five cannons, while Arjun's force had 7,000 cavalry, 5,000 infantry, and 15 cannons. The battle took place on 4 July 1788 and lasted for nearly six hours. During the fight, he was killed. He left behind many monuments of his generosity throughout Bundelkhand in the form of numerous tanks and buildings.

His son, Rajdhar Singh, succeeded him as the Thakur of Maihar.
