= Harde Sah =

Raja of Panna from 1731 to 1739

- Raja

Raja of Panna
- Reign: 20 December 1731 – 6 February 1739
- Predecessor: Chhatrasal
- Successor: Sabha Singh
- Died: 6 February 1739
- Issue: Sabha Singh; Pirthi Singh
- House: Panna
- Dynasty: Bundela
- Father: Chhatrasal

Harde Sah (died 6 February 1739), or Hirde Sah, was the Raja of Panna from 1731 until his death in 1739.

== Biography ==
In 1731, his father, Chhatrasal, divided his principality among his sons and granted the largest portion, valued at 39 lakhs annually, to his eldest son, Harde Sah. Harde Sah's share included Panna. In 1731, he succeeded his father as the ruler of Bundelkhand. That same year, he established his capital at Panna, which marked the beginning of Panna’s existence as a separate principality.

In 1732, he attacked the state of Rewa during the minority of its ruler, Avadhut Singh, and constructed the Bundela Darwaza there. He also annexed Birsinghpur, a part of Rewa, into his territory. He continued to hold Rewa until 1739, when he restored it to Avadhut Singh.

He married and had a total of nine sons, eight of whom were legitimate and one illegitimate.

He died on 6 February 1739 and was succeeded by his son Sabha Singh. He had another son, Pirthi Singh, who was appointed to Garhakota and became the ancestor of the Raja of Shahgarh.
