= Hindupat Singh =

Raja of Panna (1758–1778)

- Raja

Raja of Panna
- Reign: c. 1758 – c. 1777
- Predecessor: Aman Singh
- Successor: Anirudh Singh
- Died: c. 1777
- Issue: Sarnet Singh; Anirudh Singh; Dhokal Singh
- House: Panna
- Dynasty: Bundela
- Father: Sabha Singh

Hindupat Singh was the Raja of Panna from 1758 until his death in 1777.

== Biography ==
Although Hindupat was the eldest son of Sabha Singh, his father superseded his right of succession to the title, rank, and dignity in favor of his younger and beloved son, Aman Singh. He murdered his brother, Aman Singh, in 1758 and succeeded him as the Raja of Panna. Immediately after, he banished his younger brother, Khet Singh, from Panna. On 1 July 1758, Shamsher Bahadur and Govind Ballal visited Bundelkhand and reached an agreement with him. They also spoke to him about the injustice done to his brother Khet. After hearing them, he granted Khet a portion of his territory for his maintenance. Govind Ballal, on behalf of Nana Saheb I, proclaimed him the legitimate ruler of Panna. To have the tika applied to his forehead by the Peshwa, he paid a nazrana (transl. gift or tribute) of Rs. 5,01,000 in three installments: Rs. 1,67,000 in 1759, Rs. 1,67,000 in 1760, and Rs. 1,67,000 in 1761.

He decisively defeated Himmat Bahadur when the latter waged war against him in 1762.

He married and had three sons: Sarnet Singh, Anirudh Singh, and Dhokal Singh.

He died in 1777 and was succeeded by his son Anirudh Singh.
