= Prag Das =

Thakur of Bijairaghogarh (1826 – 1845)

- Thakur

Thakur of Bijairaghogarh
- Reign: c. 1826 – c. 1845
- Predecessor: Position established
- Successor: Surju Prasad
- Died: c. 1845
- Issue: Surju Prasad
- Father: Durjan Singh

Prag Das was the Thakur of Bijairaghogarh from 1826 until his death in 1845.

== Biography ==
He was born to Durjan Singh, the Thakur of Maihar, and, upon his father’s death in 1826, inherited the chiefship of Bijairaghogarh. The British government conferred a sanad upon him on 29 February 1828, and through it, they recognized him as the chief of Bijairaghogarh. He conducted the affairs of his state with great success and introduced many beneficial reforms. During his reign, the Bijairaghogarh was considered a flourishing place with an efficient and benevolent administration. He built a temple dedicated to Lord Vijayraghav and a fort named Vijayraghavgarh.

He died in 1845, and his son Surju Prasad succeeded him to the title.
