= Shamsher Bahadur I =

Maratha ruler of Banda
- Reign: 28 April 1740 – 18 January 1761
- Predecessor: Baji Rao I, Peshwa of Maratha Empire
- Successor: Ali Bahadur I
- Born: 1734; Mastani Palace, Shaniwarwada, Pune, Maratha Empire
- Died: 18 January 1761 (aged 26–27), Bharatpur, Maratha Empire India
- Spouse: Lal Kanwar; Mehrambai; Sahib Jan
- Issue: Ali Bahadur I
Names
- Shamsher Bahadur I
- House: Bhat (Maratha Empire)
- Father: Baji Rao I
- Mother: Mastani
- Religion: Sunni Islam

Shamsher Bahadur I (born Krishna Rao 1734 – 18 January 1761), was a ruler of the Maratha dominion of Banda in northern India (in the historic region of Bundelkhand). He was the son of Peshwa Bajirao I and Mastani.

== Early life ==
Krishna Rao was the son of Peshwa Baji Rao I and his second wife Mastani, daughter of Maharaja Chhatrasal and Ruhani Rai Begum, Ruhani Bai. Bajirao wanted his son to be accepted as a Hindu Brahmin, but because his mother was a Muslim, Brahmin priests refused to conduct the Hindu upanayana ceremony for him. Thus, Bajirao ordered that he be raised as a Muslim.

His education and military training was conducted in line with other sons of the Peshwa family, even though many Maratha nobles and chiefs did not recognize Mastani as a legitimate wife of the Peshwa.

After the death of both Baji Rao and Mastani in 1740, Shamsher was taken into the household of Kashibai, Baji Rao's widow, and raised as one of her own. He married Laal Kunwar daughter of Abdul Momin (Lakshadhira Dalpatrao Pawar) on 14 January 1749, and soon after her death in 1753, Shamsher Bahadur was married to Mehrambai on 18 October 1753. Shamsher Bahadur had one son by Mehrambai named Krishna Sinh, later known as Ali Bahadur. He succeeded Shamsher Bahadur as the Peshwa Subahdar of Banda.

== Military career and reign ==
Shamsher Bahadur was bestowed upon a portion of his father's dominion of Banda and Kalpi in present day North Indian state of Uttar Pradesh.

He, alongside Raghunathrao, Malharrao Holkar, Dattaji Shinde, Jankoji Shinde and other Sardars, went to Punjab in 1757–1758 to fight the Durrani Empire and conquered Attock, Peshawar, Multan in 1758. He was part of Maratha Conquest of North India.

In 1761, he and his army contingent fought alongside his cousins from the Peshwa family in the Third Battle of Panipat between the Marathas and Afghan forces of Ahmad Shah Abdali. He was wounded in that battle and died a few days later at Deeg.

== Descendants ==
Upon the death of Shamsher, his son Krishna Sinh (Ali Bahadur) (1758-1802), became the Nawab of the dominion of Banda (present day Uttar Pradesh) in northern India, a vassal of Maratha polity. Under the auspices of the powerful Maratha nobles, Ali Bahadur established his authority over large parts of Bundelkhand and became the Nawab of Banda and placed his trusted aide Ramsingh Bhatt as kotwal of Kalinjar.

His son and successor Shamsher Bahadur II held allegiance towards the Maratha polity and fought the English in the Anglo-Maratha War of 1803. His descendant Ali Bahadur fought alongside Rani Lakshmibai in the First War of Indian Independence of 1857. After his defeat, Banda state was abolished by the East India Company government. The present day descendants of Shamsher Bahadur live in Central India.

== In popular culture ==
In the 2015 film Bajirao Mastani he was referenced and his naming ceremony was shown. In the 2019 film Panipat, Shamsher Bahadur I was played by Sahil Salathia.

== See also ==
- Mastani
- Peshwa Bajirao
- Bhat family
