= Banda (state) =

Indian princely state (1790–1857)

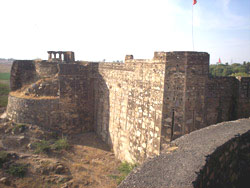
Bhuragarh fort, maintained by the rulers of Banda State.

Banda was a princely state centered in Banda, in modern-day Uttar Pradesh, India. It was disestablished due to its participation in the Indian Rebellion of 1857.

The former region controlled by Banda state had a population of 698,608 people in 1881.

== History ==
The founder of Banda was Ali Bahadur I. He was a grandson of the Peshwa Bajirao and son of Shamsher Bahadur. Bahadur managed to carve an independent principality for himself. However, the short-lived state ceased to exist after it participated in the unsuccessful Indian Rebellion of 1857. Its last ruler Ali Bahadur II was deposed, and the state was annexed by the British Raj and they appointed a taluqdar from Awadh to govern the area.

== List of rulers ==
- Shamsher Bahadur (1740–1761)
- Ali Bahadur I (1761–1802)
- Zulfiqar Ali (1802)
- Shamsher Bahadur II (1802–1825)
- Zulfiqar Ali (1823–1850)
- Ali Bahadur II (1850–1858)

== See also ==
- List of princely states of British India (alphabetical)
- List of princely states of British India (by region)
