= Ali Bahadur II =

British Indian ruler of Banda (1832–1873)

Ali Bahadur II (1832–1873) (r. 1850–1858) was the last ruler (Nawab) of Banda which was then part of Bundelkhand. He decided to join the Indian Rebellion of 1857, he joined forces of Rani of Jhansi, Rao Saheb and Tatya Tope and was one of Major Commanders of Rebel force at Gwalior and in the aftermath his state was annexed by the British Raj. He also helped Tatya Tope in Siege of Charkhari. He surrendered in November 1858 and lived in exile at Indore with Pension of Rs. 36,000 per annum and he died in 1873. He was a descendant of Peshwa Baji Rao I and his Muslim wife Mastani.
