= Ali Bahadur I =

Ali Bahadur
- Nawab of Bundelkhand (conqueror of Bundelkhand) (Peshwa)
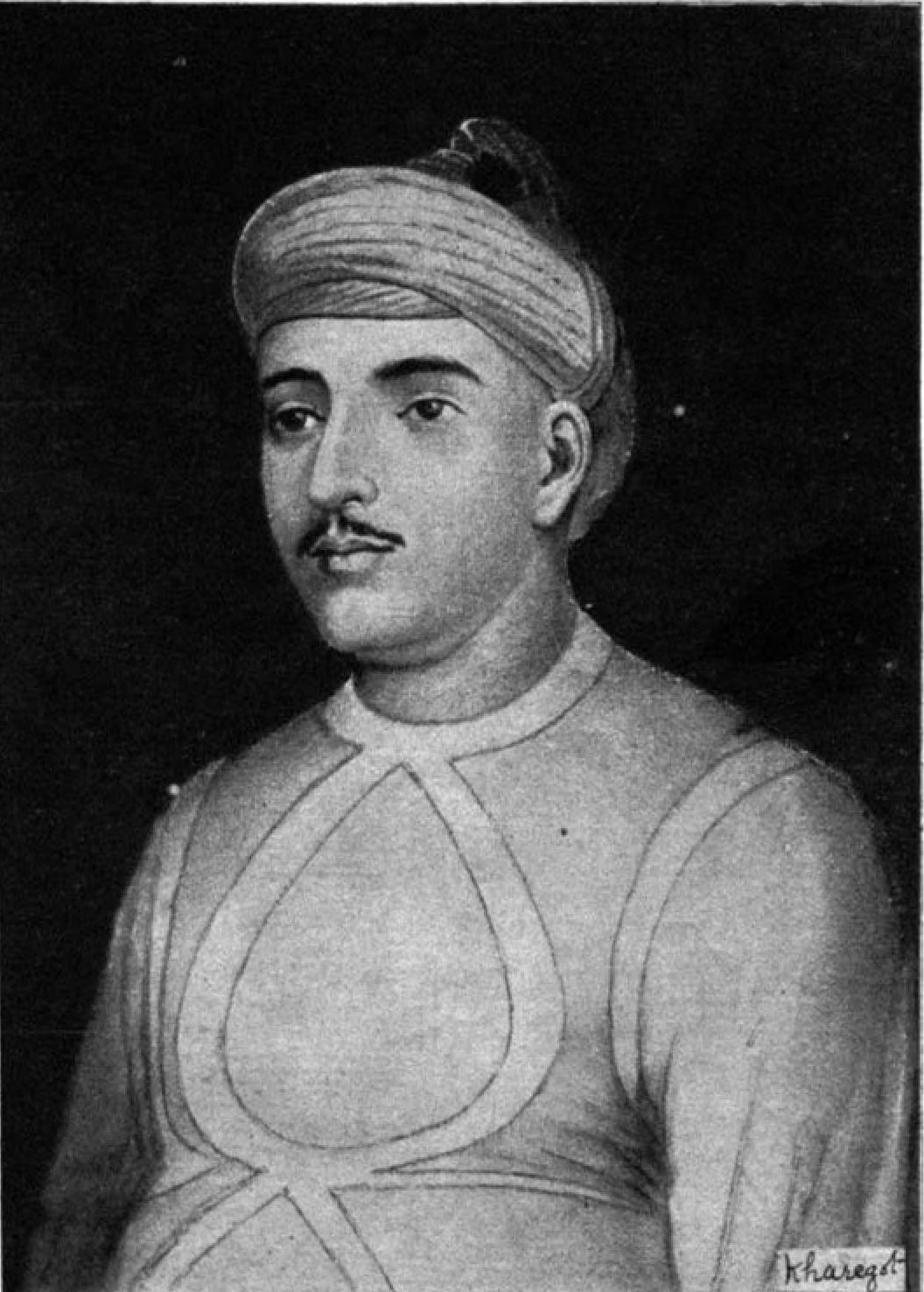

Maratha ruler of Banda
- Reign: 18 January 1761 – 1802
- Predecessor: Shamsher Bahadur, Jagirdar of Banda and Kalpi
- Successor: Shamsher Bahadur II, Nawab of Banda (Bundelkhand)
- Born: 1758; Madhya Pradesh, Maratha Empire
- Died: 1802 (aged 43–44) , Maratha Empire
- Spouse: Nawab Begum; Badshaha Begum; Dulaj Begum
Names
- Ali Bahadur
- House: Bhat (Maratha Empire); Bundela
- Father: Shamsher Bahadur I
- Mother: Mehrambai
- Religion: Sunni Islam

Ali Bahadur (1758–1802), also known as Krishna Sinha, was a Nawab of the dominion of Banda Bundelkhand (present day Uttar Pradesh) in northern India, a vassal of the Maratha Empire. He was the son of Shamsher Bahadur I and the grandson of Peshwa Bajirao I and Mastani .

Under the auspices of the Maratha nobles, Ali Bahadur established his authority over large parts of Bundelkhand and became the Peshwa's Subedar of Banda. His son and successor Shamsher Bahadur II held allegiance towards the Maratha polity and fought the English in the Anglo-Maratha War of 1803.

== See also ==
- Maratha Empire
- Mahadaji Shinde, Maharaja of Gwalior
- Shamsher Bahadur I
- Bhat Peshwa Family
