= List of villages in Shrigonda taluka =

== A ==
- Adhalgaon
- Adhorewadi
- Ajnuj
- Anandwadi
- Arangaon Dumala
- Arvi
- Angare

== B ==
- Baburdi
- Ban Pimpri
- Bangarda
- Belwandi Bk.
- Belwandi Kothar
- Bhangaon
- Bhaudi
- Bori
- Bhingan Khalsa
- Bhingan Dumala

== C ==
- Chorachiwadi
- Chambhurdi
- Chimbhale
- Chandgaon

chikhali

== D ==
- Deodaithan
- Deulgaon
- Dhawalgaon (Dhavalgaon)
- Dhoraja (Khandobachi vadi)

== E ==
- Erondali

== G ==
- Gar
- Gavanwadi
- Ghargaon
- Ghodegaon
- Ghogargaon
- Ghotavi
- Ghugalwadgaon
- Ghutewadi

== H ==
- Hangewadi
- Hinganidumala
- Hirdgaon

== K ==
- Kamthi
- Kashti
- Kautha
- Khandgaon
- Kolgaon
- Kondeghavan
- Koregaon
- Koregavhan
- Kosegavhan
- Kothul

== L ==
- Limpangaon
- Loni Vyanknath

== Madhevadgaon ==
- Madhevadgaon
- Mahadevwadi
- Mandavgaon
- Math
- Mhase
- Mhatar Pimpri
- Mungasgaon
- Mote Wadi (Pargaon Sudrik)
- Malwadi-Ajnuj

mundhekarwadi

== N ==
- Nimbhavi
- Nimgaon Khalu
- Narodewasti
- Nandur Mdhmeshwar

== P ==
- Pargaon Sudrik
- Pedgaon
- Pimpalgaon Pisa
- Pimpri Kolandar
- Pisore Khand (Pohi Phata)
- Pisore Budruk (Yelpane)
- pimpalgaon Bsvant

== R ==
- Raighavan
- Rajapur
- Ruikhel

== S ==
- Sanghvi Dumala
- Sarola Somanvanshi
- Shedgaon
- Shirasgaon Bodhaka
- Suregaon
- Surodi
- Shrisakhar

== T ==
- Takali kadewalit
- Takali Lonar
- Tandali Dumala
- Tardghavhan
- Thetesanghvi

== U ==
- Ukkadgaon

- Ukkhalgaon

== V ==
- Vadali
- Wangadari
- Velu
- Visapur

== w ==
- Wadgaon

== Y ==
- Yelpane
- Yevati

== See also ==
- Shrigonda tehsil
- Tehsils in Ahmednagar
- Villages in Akole tehsil
- Villages in Jamkhed tehsil
- Villages in Karjat tehsil
- Villages in Kopargaon tehsil
- Villages in Nagar tehsil
- Villages in Nevasa tehsil
- Villages in Parner tehsil
- Villages in Pathardi tehsil
- Villages in Rahata tehsil
- Villages in Rahuri tehsil
- Villages in Sangamner tehsil
- Villages in Shevgaon tehsil
- Villages in Shrirampur tehsil
