= Chorachiwadi =

Village in Maharashtra, India

- Location in Maharashtra, India Chorachiwadi (India)
- Coordinates: 18.559849°N 74.708905°E
- Country: India
- State: Maharashtra
- District: Ahmadnagar
- Established: Unknown

Government
  - Type: Panachayat Raj
  - Sarpanch: Mrs. R S Bhapkar
  - Deputy Sarpanch: Mr. Dada Chavan
- Elevation: 561 m (1,841 ft)

Population (2001)
  - Total: 2,000

Languages
  - Official: Marathi
- Time zone: UTC+5:30 (IST)
- PIN: 413701
- Telephone code: 912487
- Vehicle registration: MH-16

Chorachiwadi is a panchayat village in Maharashtra, India. Administratively, Chorachiwadi is in the Shrigonda taluka of Ahmadnagar District in Maharashtra.

Chorachiwadi has a group Grampanchayat comprising the Chorachiwadi, Bhingan Dumala, and Bhingan Khalsa. Among these, Chorachiwadi is main land and largest population. It is located between the historic Bahadur Gadh (Known for last days of Chhatrapati Sambhaji after capture) fort of Pedgaon and the Shrigonda town. Bhingan Dumala and Bhingan Khalsa are situated on the banks of Saraswati, a tributary of Bhima River that flows five kilometers more to confluence with the Bhima River in Pedgaon.

== Agriculture ==
Most of the villagers are farmers and harvest various crops such as sugarcane, sorghum (Jowar), wheat, cotton, grapes, lemons, pomegranates, bananas, different nuts such as tree nuts and peanuts, onions, watermelons, and cucumbers.

Since the region comes under shadow of western ghat, the rainfall is limited and irrigation largely depends on canal water, from the project called Kukadi and Ghod. The Good water canal cross the Saraswati river through the siphon.

== Education ==
Chorachiwadi and its subpart Bhingan have multiple Anganwadi/Balwadi (kindergartens). In addition, in chorachiwadi, there are two more mini-anganwadis for the children's staying on the outskirts of the village like Salunke Wasti, Landge Wasti, etc.

The primary school run by the Zilla Parishad is available up to seventh grade in the Chorachiwadi and up to fourth grade in the Bhingan. For eight to tenth grade, a private high school named Pralhad Maharaj High School (since 2006) is available.

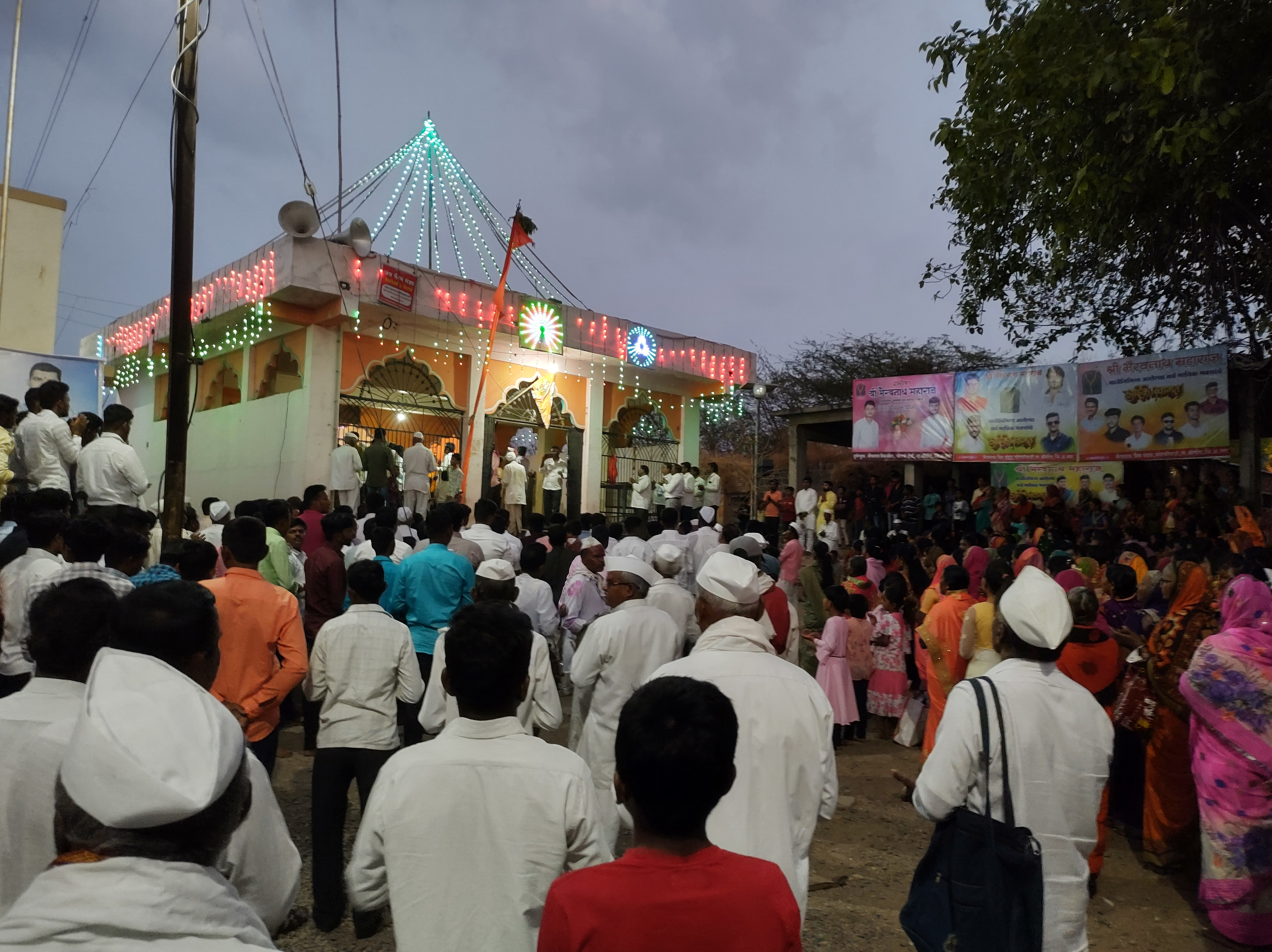
All villagers performing the Arati rituals for the village deity "Bhairavnath"

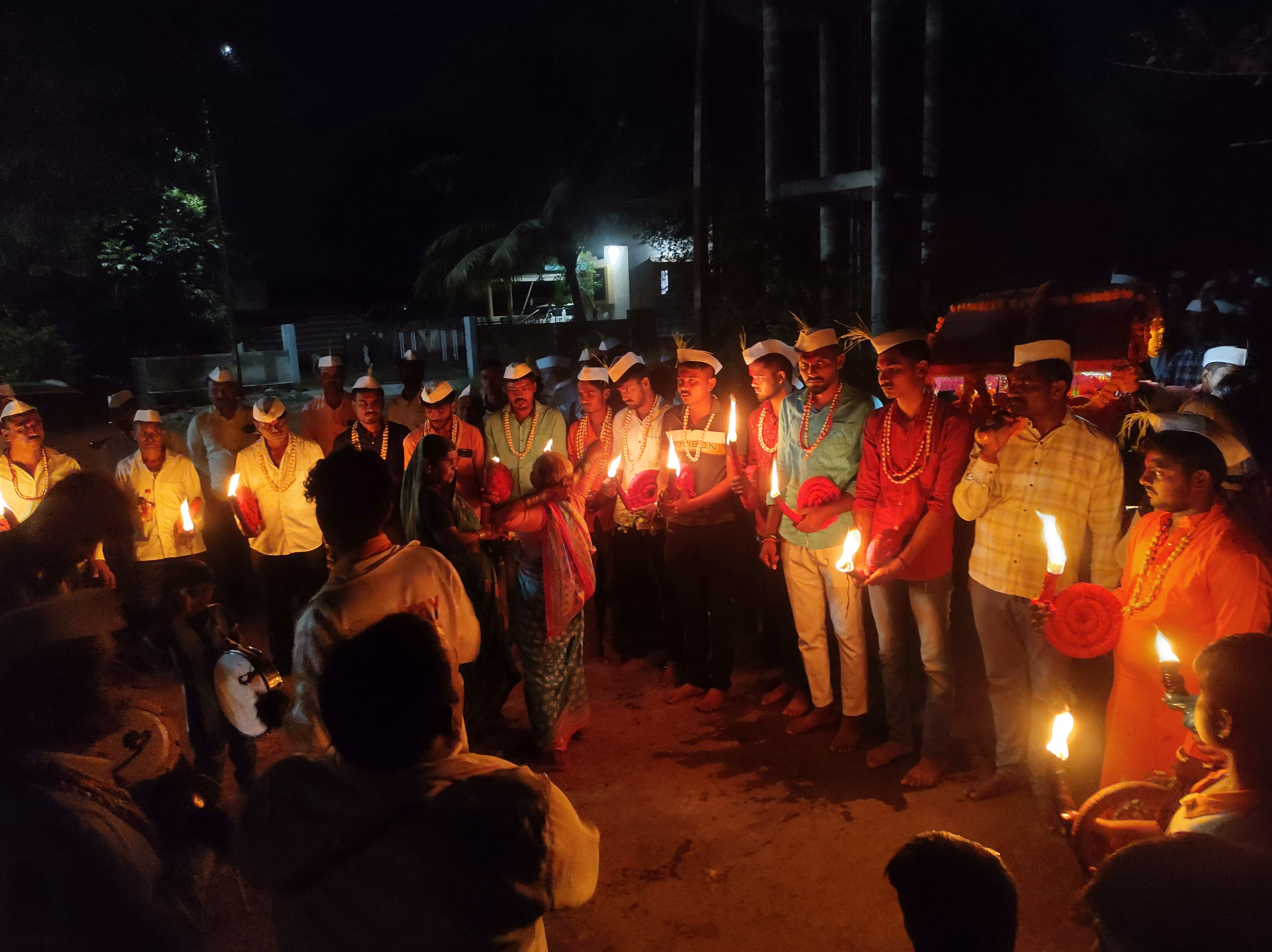
Dasara procession

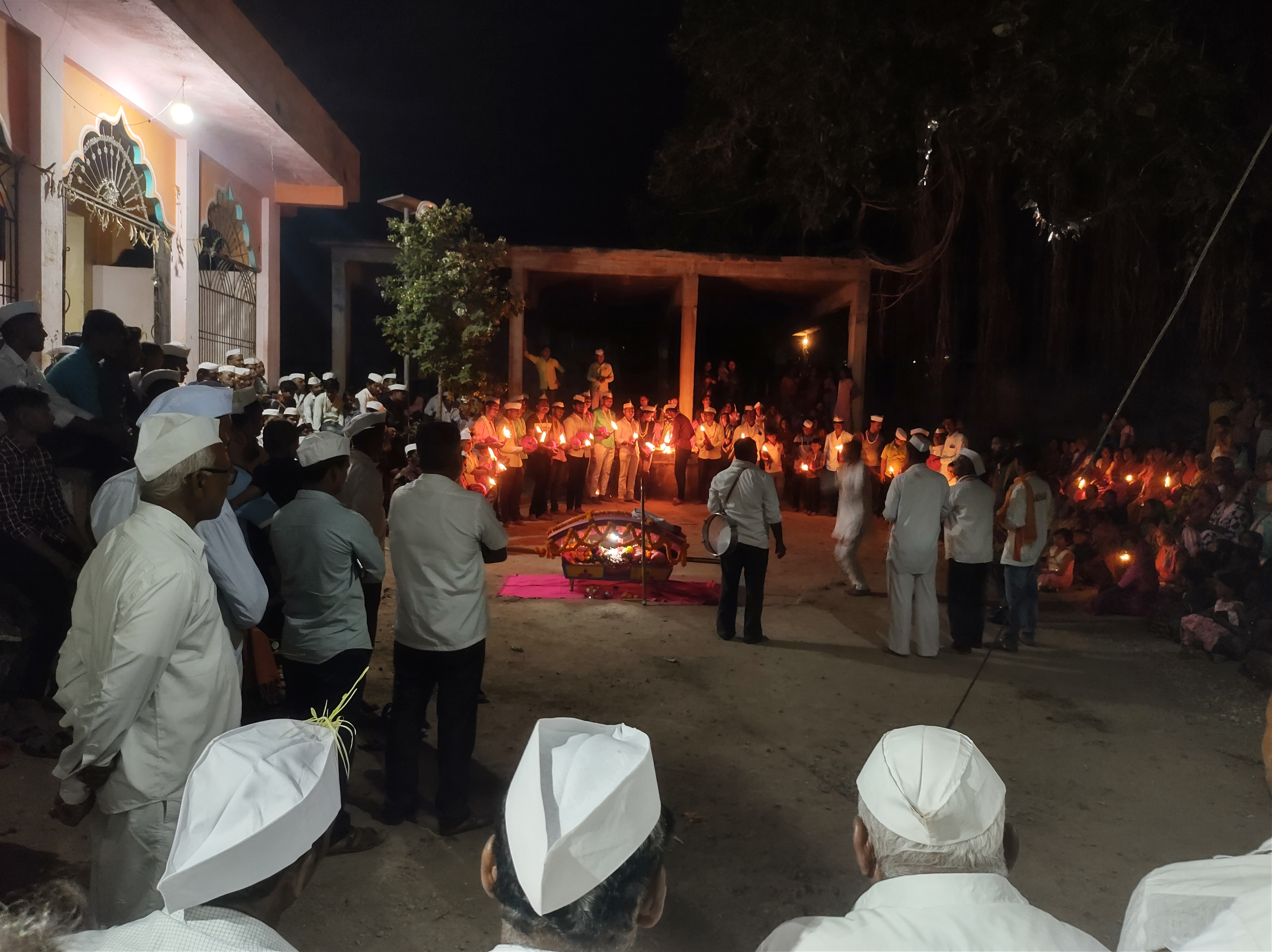
All villagers performing the Arati rituals on the day of Dasara

Students can also enroll in other high schools of Shrigonda, where they can opt for a convent or semi-English medium school and pursue vocational courses along with their regular courses. Several students from Chorachiwadi have completed and pursuing their engineering degrees from reputed government and non-government engineering colleges all over Maharashtra.

== Politics ==
As of 2014, the total number of voters was around 1200. Villegers elect nine members from three wards for panchayat.

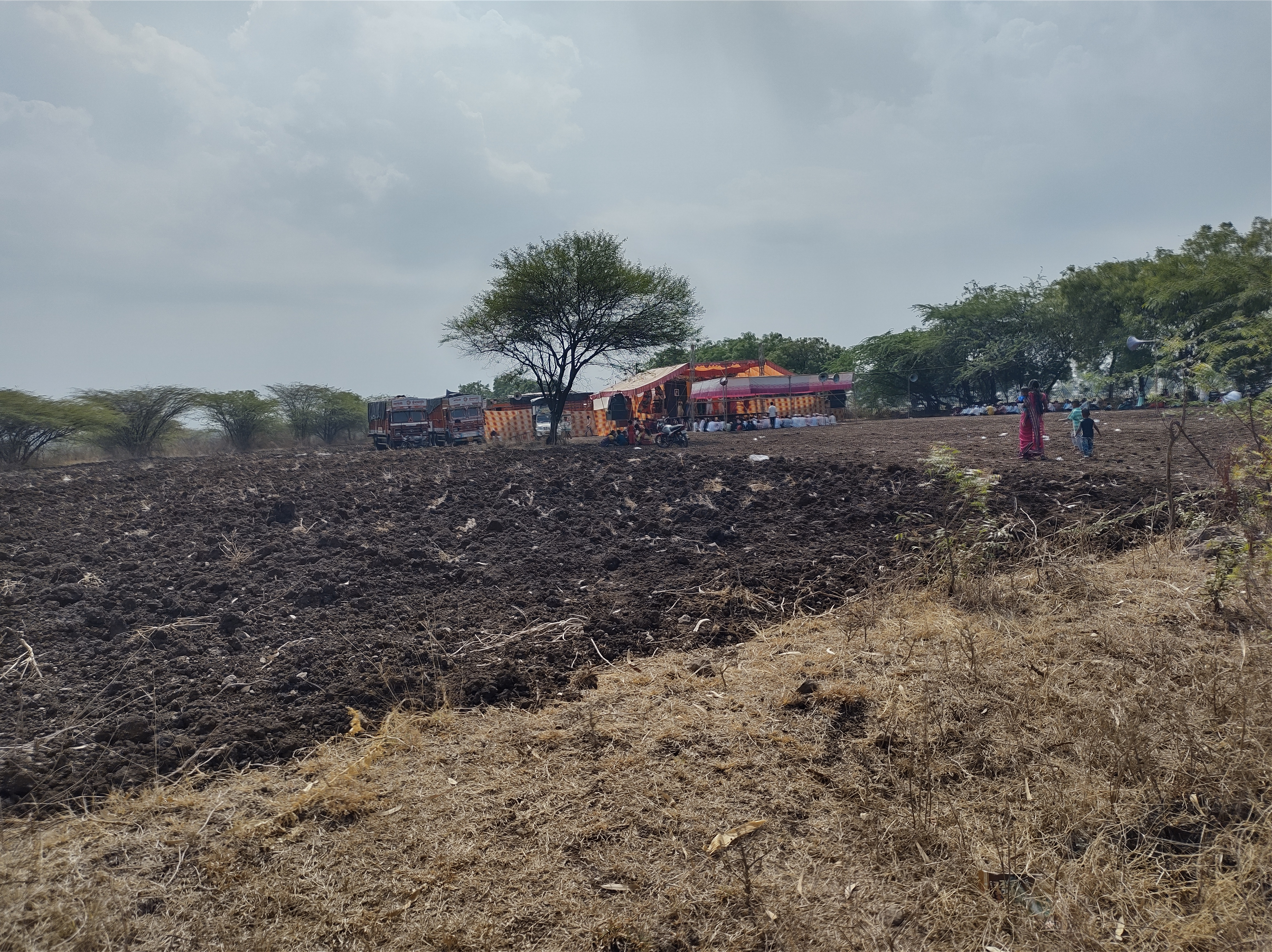
Folk dance cum drama called Tamasha held in outskirts of village on first day of annual village festival

== Sports ==
The youth of Chorachiwadi plays different sports. Kho kho and Kabaddi have been played since primary school, and they participates in interschool Kho kho and Kabaddi competitions to represent Chorachiwadi.

On the day of Sankranti, the youth organizes informal Kabaddi matches in the village.

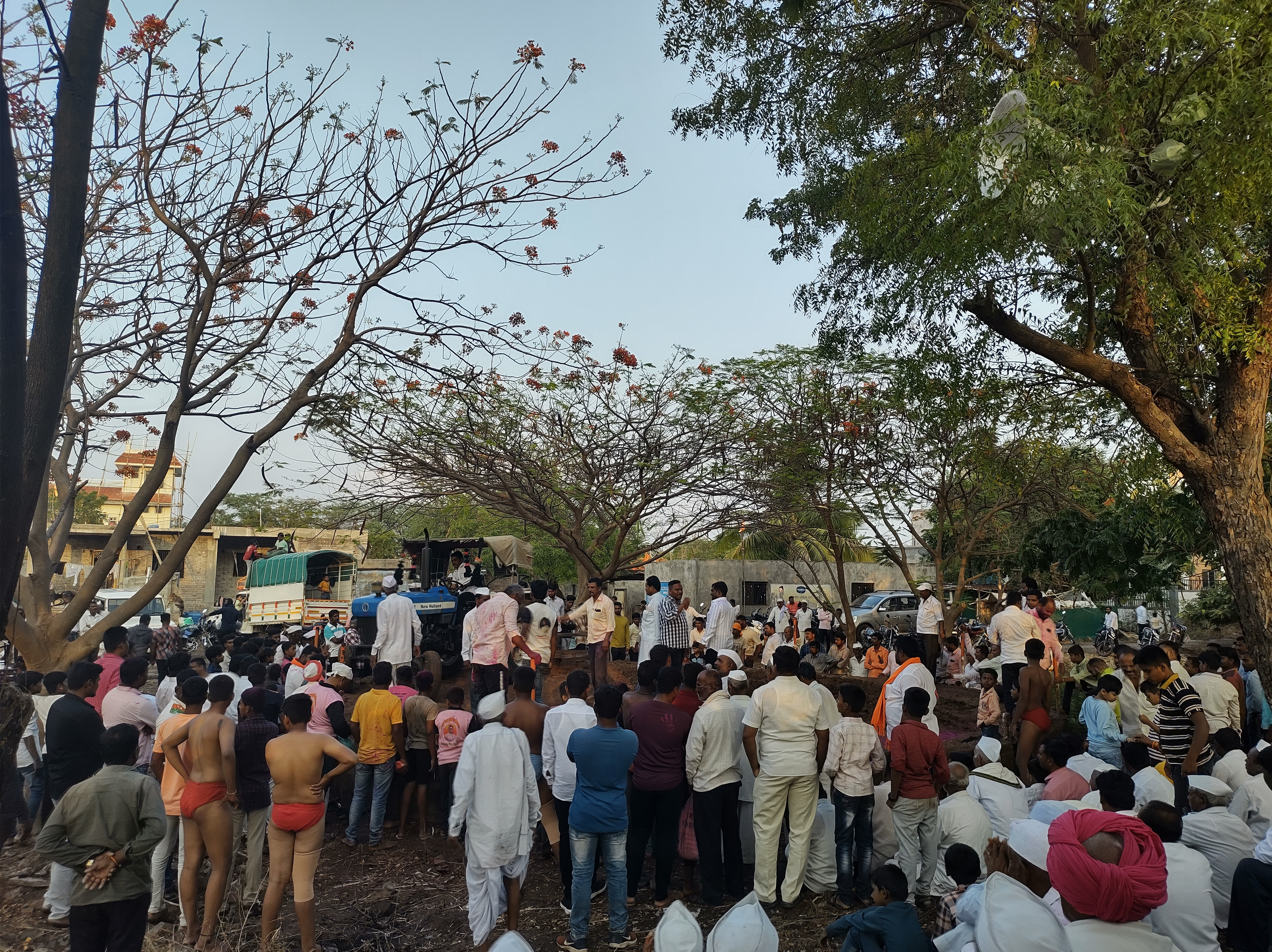
Wrestling competition called Aakhada organised on second day of annual village festival

The Chorachiwadi Cricket team participates in various cricket tournaments all over the district. The youth also had started a Chorachiwadi Premier League (CPL) cricket league and organized a cricket tournament in October 2016. Apart from this Volleyball has also gained the popularity.
