= State Highway 10 (Maharashtra) =

Road in Maharashtra, India

State Highway 10

Route information
- Maintained by MSRDC
- Length: 373.6 km (232.1 mi)

Major junctions
- North end: Dondaicha, Dhule
- National Highway 53 at Kusumbe; National Highway 60 at Malegaon; National Highway 222 at Ahmednagar
- South end: Daund, Pune

Location
- Country: India
- State: Maharashtra
- Districts: Dhule, Pune
- Primary destinations: Shevade, Mehergaon, Kusumbe, Malegaon, Manmad, Kopargaon, Rahata, Rahuri, Kashti, Ahmednagar

Highway system
- Roads in India; Expressways; National; State; Asian; State Highways in Maharashtra

State Highway 10, commonly referred to as MH SH 10, is a normal state highway that runs south through Pune, Ahmednagar, Nashik and Dhule districts in the state of Maharashtra, India. This state highway touches the cities of Dondaicha, Shevade, Mehergaon, Kusumbe, Malegaon, Manmad, Yeola, Kopargaon, Shirdi Rahata, Rahuri, Ahmednagar, Kashti, and Daund.

== Summary ==
In Nashik District this highway is known as "Malegaon-Manmad Road". Starting from Malegaon in Nashik district from its junction with National Highway 3, this highway terminates inside Manmad. Both sections of the highway run in a southward direction throughout their length. The highway runs a distance of XXX miles and traverses through Yeola, Nandgaon, Chandawad and Malegaon talukas. The surface of the road is asphalted and is motorable throughout the year.

In Ahmednagar District This highway is known as "Manmad-Daund Road". Starting from Manmad in Nasik district the road enters the northern boundary of Ahmednagar district and leaves for Daund in Pune district. This road serves as a connecting link between the three districts and runs almost parallel to the Daund-Manmad railway line. The road runs from the north to south direction and passes through the middle of the district.

This road crosses the Daund-Manmad broad-gauge railway line at numerous places during its course. It crosses river Godavari near Kopargaon, the Pravara near Kolhar, the Mula near Rahuri and the Bhima near the district border where there are bridges. It crosses a major nullah near Rahata where the construction of a bridge is in progress.

Some part of the road surface is cement-concrete and the remaining length of the road is black-topped. It serves the traffic needs of many sugar factories and jaggery manufacturers. This road passes through the factory area and therefore it is always crowded by bullock-carts and lorries. It is motorable throughout the year except for some interruptions at small nullahs during heavy rains.

== Route description ==
Below is the brief summary of the route followed by this state highway.

=== Dhule District ===
==== Sindkheda Taluka ====
This highway starts from Dondaicha city in Sindkheda Taluka of Dhule District and proceeds South West towards Kusumbe. After travelling for 18.8 km (11.7 mi), State Highway 11 intersects this highway just before Shevade village and this highway continues southwards. After travelling for another 6.3 km (3.9 mi), it exits Sindkheda Taluka just before Lamkhani village and enters the Dhule taluka.

==== Dhule Taluka ====
Once this highway enters Dhule taluka, it travels for another 2.7 km (1.7 mi) and enters Lamkhani village where State Highway 12 intersects this highway inside the village and this highway continues southwards. After traveling for another 15.3 km (9.5 mi) this highway enters Mehergaon village where State Highway 14 starts off and proceeds south-east towards Dhule city while this highway proceeds south-west. Then this highways travels for another 9.7 km (6.0 mi) where it intersects in to National Highway 53 at Kusumbe city. It then continues southwards for another 13 km (8.1 mi) where it exits Dhule taluka just after Ajnale village and enters Malegaon Taluka of Nashik District.

=== Nashik District ===
==== Malegaon Taluka ====
This highway enters Malegaon taluka of Nashik district just before Dongrale village. After crossing Dongrale village, it continues for southwards another 27.2 km (16.9 mi) where it enters Malegaon city. It then travels internally inside Malegaon city for 3.7 km (2.3 mi) and exits the city on south-west side, where it intersects National Highway 60 and continues south-west. After traveling for another 5.7 km (3.5 mi), near Kaulane village the State Highway 16 starts off and proceeds south-east towards Nandgaon while this highway proceeds south-west for another 14.5 km (9.0 mi) where it exits Malegaon taluka just after Chondhi village and enters Chandwad taluka.

==== Chandvad Taluka ====
This highway enters Chandwad taluka just before Kundalgaon village. After crossing Kundalgaon village it continues southwards for another 5.6 km (3.5 mi) where it exits Chandwad taluka just after Dahegaon (Manmad) village and enters Nandgaon taluka.

==== Nandgaon Taluka ====
This highway enters Nandgaon taluka after travelling for 1 km (0.62 mi) after Dahegaon (Manmad) village of Chandvad taluka. It enters Manmad city after traveling for another 0.6 km (0.37 mi). Inside Manmad city after travelling for another 0.7 km (0.43 mi) the State Highway 24 intersects this highway and merges on to it. Further State Highway 24 continues southwards with this highway for another 0.09 km (0.056 mi), and then it branches west to proceed towards Chandvad city, while this highway continues south towards Anakwade village. After crossing Anakwade village it continues southwards for another 0.4 km (0.25 mi) where it exits Nandgaon taluka and enters Yeola taluka.

==== Yeola Taluka ====
This highway enters Yeola taluka just after Anakwade village of Nandgaon taluka. After crossing Savargaon village it continues southwards for another 6 km (3.7 mi) where it enters Yeola city. Inside Yeola city after this highway has travelled for another 6 km (3.7 mi), the State Highway 30 intersects this highway from the west and merges on to it, while State Highway 25 starts at this point and continues northeast towards Nandgaon city. State Highway 30 continues southwards with this highway for another 0.6 km (0.37 mi), and then it branches east to proceed towards Vaijapur city, while this highway continues southwards. After travelling for another 8.2 km (5.1 mi) it exits Yeola Taluka just after Pimpalgaon Jalal village and enters Kopargaon Taluka of Ahmednagar District.

=== Ahmadnagar District ===
==== Kopargaon Taluka ====
This highway enters Kopargaon taluka of Ahmednagar district just before Yesgaon village. After crossing Yesgaon village, it continues southwards for another 5.2 km (3.2 mi) where it enters Kopargaon city. After crossing Kopargaon city it continues southwards where it exits the taluka just before Sawali Vihir Bk. village and enters Rahata taluka.

==== Rahata Taluka ====
This highway enters Rahata taluka just before Sawali Vihir Bk. village. Just before Sawali Vihir Bk. village the State Highway 7 starts off at the junction of this highway and proceeds north west towards Lasalgaon in Nashik district., while this highway continues southwards for another 24 km (15 mi) where it intersects State Highway 44 inside Babhaleshwar village. Then this highway continues southwards for another 7 km (4.3 mi) where State Highway 45 starts off at the junction of this highway inside Kolhar Bk. village and proceeds north west towards Sinnar in Nashik district. Then this highway continues southwards for another 0.9 km (0.56 mi) where it exits Rahata taluka just after crossing Pravara river near Kolhar Bk. village and enters Rahuri taluka.

==== Rahuri Taluka ====
This highway enters Rahuri taluka after crossing Pravara river and just before Kolhar Kh. village. After continuing southwards for another 19.8 km (12.3 mi), State Highway 49 branches off at the junction of this highway inside Rahuri city and proceeds south west towards Sangamner in Ahmadnagar district while this highway continues southwards. Further traveling for 9.7 km (6.0 mi), another branch of State Highway 49 branches off at this junction and proceeds east towards Shevgaon in Ahmadnagar district while this highway continues southwards where it exits Rahuri taluka just before near Nandgaon village and enters Ahmadnagar taluka.

==== Ahmadnagar Taluka ====
This highway enters Ahmadnagar taluka just before Nandgaon village

== Major junctions ==
The following roads either emanate from it or are crossed by it. This list has been separated by district and taluka for easy reading.

Taluka	Distance	Location of junction	Junction
Dhule District
Sindkheda	20.2 km (12.6 mi)	Shewade village	State Highway 11
Dhule	27.8 km (17.3 mi)	Lamkani village	State Highway 12
Dhule	43.1 km (26.8 mi)	Mehergaon village	State Highway 14
Dhule	52.8 km (32.8 mi)	Kusumbe city	National Highway 53
Nashik District
Malegaon	104 km (65 mi)	Malegaon city	National Highway 60
Malegaon	109.7 km (68.2 mi)	Kaulane village	State Highway 16
Nandgaon	135.8 km (84.4 mi)	Manmad city	State Highway 24
Yeola	167.1 km (103.8 mi)	Yeola city	State Highway 25
Yeola	167.1 km (103.8 mi)	Yeola city	State Highway 30
Ahmednagar District
Kopargaon	189.6 km (117.8 mi)	Kopargaon city	State Highway 7
Rahata	213.6 km (132.7 mi)	Bhalbhaleshwar village	State Highway 44
Rahata	220.6 km (137.1 mi)	Kolhar Budruk village	State Highway 45
Rahuri	241.2 km (149.9 mi)	Rahuri city	State Highway 49 (West Bound)
Rahuri	250.9 km (155.9 mi)	Rahuri city	State Highway 49 (East Bound)
Ahmednagar	271 km (168 mi)	Ahmednagar city	State Highway 145
Ahmednagar	277.4 km (172.4 mi)	Ahmednagar city	State Highway 60
Ahmednagar	278.8 km (173.2 mi)	Ahmednagar city	Major State Highway 2
Ahmednagar	278.8 km (173.2 mi)	Ahmednagar city	National Highway 222
Ahmednagar	278.8 km (173.2 mi)	Ahmednagar city	State Highway 148
Ahmednagar	278.8 km (173.2 mi)	Ahmednagar city	State Highway 141
Shrigonda	337.5 km (209.7 mi)	Madhewadgaon village	State Highway 50
Shrigonda	340.1 km (211.3 mi)	Dhokrai phata	State Highway 55
Shrigonda	352.5 km (219.0 mi)	Nimgaon Khalu village	State Highway 67

== Connections ==
This highway touches the following important places in its stretch. The list has been separated by district and taluka for easy reading. In each table, the distance of the place from important places in the route of this highway are also mentioned.

=== Dhule District ===
Name	Distance						
Name	Dondaicha	Kusumbe	Malegaon	Manmad	Kopargaon	Ahmadnagar	Daund
Sindkheda Taluka
Dondaicha	0 km (0 mi)	52.8 km (32.8 mi)	100.3 km (62.3 mi)	135.8 km (84.4 mi)	178.9 km (111.2 mi)	267.7 km (166.3 mi)	373.6 km (232.1 mi)
Mandal	3.4 km (2.1 mi)	49.4 km (30.7 mi)	96.9 km (60.2 mi)	132.4 km (82.3 mi)	175.5 km (109.1 mi)	264.3 km (164.2 mi)	370.2 km (230.0 mi)
Anjanvihire	9.3 km (5.8 mi)	43.5 km (27.0 mi)	91 km (57 mi)	126.5 km (78.6 mi)	169.6 km (105.4 mi)	258.4 km (160.6 mi)	364.3 km (226.4 mi)
Degaon	15.9 km (9.9 mi)	36.9 km (22.9 mi)	84.4 km (52.4 mi)	119.9 km (74.5 mi)	163 km (101 mi)	251.8 km (156.5 mi)	357.7 km (222.3 mi)
Shevade	20.2 km (12.6 mi)	32.6 km (20.3 mi)	80.1 km (49.8 mi)	115.6 km (71.8 mi)	158.7 km (98.6 mi)	247.5 km (153.8 mi)	353.4 km (219.6 mi)
Dhule Taluka
Lamkhani	27.8 km (17.3 mi)	25 km (16 mi)	72.5 km (45.0 mi)	108 km (67 mi)	151.1 km (93.9 mi)	239.9 km (149.1 mi)	345.8 km (214.9 mi)
Chinchwar	35.1 km (21.8 mi)	17.7 km (11.0 mi)	65.2 km (40.5 mi)	100.7 km (62.6 mi)	143.8 km (89.4 mi)	232.6 km (144.5 mi)	338.5 km (210.3 mi)
Navalane	42.5 km (26.4 mi)	10.3 km (6.4 mi)	57.8 km (35.9 mi)	93.3 km (58.0 mi)	136.4 km (84.8 mi)	225.2 km (139.9 mi)	331.1 km (205.7 mi)
Mehergaon	43.1 km (26.8 mi)	9.7 km (6.0 mi)	57.2 km (35.5 mi)	92.7 km (57.6 mi)	135.8 km (84.4 mi)	224.6 km (139.6 mi)	330.5 km (205.4 mi)
Kawathi	47.4 km (29.5 mi)	5.4 km (3.4 mi)	52.9 km (32.9 mi)	88.4 km (54.9 mi)	131.5 km (81.7 mi)	220.3 km (136.9 mi)	326.2 km (202.7 mi)
Kusumbe	52.8 km (32.8 mi)	0 km (0 mi)	47.5 km (29.5 mi)	83 km (52 mi)	126.1 km (78.4 mi)	214.9 km (133.5 mi)	320.8 km (199.3 mi)
Ajnale	63.8 km (39.6 mi)	11 km (6.8 mi)	36.5 km (22.7 mi)	72 km (45 mi)	115.1 km (71.5 mi)	203.9 km (126.7 mi)	309.8 km (192.5 mi)

=== Nashik District ===
Name	Distance						
Name	Dondaicha	Kusumbe	Malegaon	Manmad	Kopargaon	Ahmadnagar	Daund
Malegaon Taluka
Dongrale	69.3 km (43.1 mi)	16.5 km (10.3 mi)	31 km (19 mi)	66.5 km (41.3 mi)	109.6 km (68.1 mi)	198.4 km (123.3 mi)	304.3 km (189.1 mi)
Tingri	74.5 km (46.3 mi)	21.7 km (13.5 mi)	25.8 km (16.0 mi)	61.3 km (38.1 mi)	104.4 km (64.9 mi)	193.2 km (120.0 mi)	299.1 km (185.9 mi)
Dahidi	78.1 km (48.5 mi)	25.3 km (15.7 mi)	22.2 km (13.8 mi)	57.7 km (35.9 mi)	100.8 km (62.6 mi)	189.6 km (117.8 mi)	295.5 km (183.6 mi)
Karanj Gavhan	83.8 km (52.1 mi)	31 km (19 mi)	16.5 km (10.3 mi)	52 km (32 mi)	95.1 km (59.1 mi)	183.9 km (114.3 mi)	289.8 km (180.1 mi)
Lendane	87.7 km (54.5 mi)	34.9 km (21.7 mi)	12.6 km (7.8 mi)	48.1 km (29.9 mi)	91.2 km (56.7 mi)	180 km (110 mi)	285.9 km (177.7 mi)
Vadgaon	92 km (57 mi)	39.2 km (24.4 mi)	8.3 km (5.2 mi)	43.8 km (27.2 mi)	86.9 km (54.0 mi)	175.7 km (109.2 mi)	281.6 km (175.0 mi)
Malegaon city	100.3 km (62.3 mi)	47.5 km (29.5 mi)	0 km (0 mi)	35.5 km (22.1 mi)	78.6 km (48.8 mi)	167.4 km (104.0 mi)	273.3 km (169.8 mi)
Kaulane	109.7 km (68.2 mi)	56.9 km (35.4 mi)	9.4 km (5.8 mi)	26.1 km (16.2 mi)	69.2 km (43.0 mi)	158 km (98 mi)	263.9 km (164.0 mi)
Ghodegaon Chowki	112.4 km (69.8 mi)	59.6 km (37.0 mi)	12.1 km (7.5 mi)	23.4 km (14.5 mi)	66.5 km (41.3 mi)	155.3 km (96.5 mi)	261.2 km (162.3 mi)
Jalgaon (Nimbait)	118.8 km (73.8 mi)	66 km (41 mi)	18.5 km (11.5 mi)	17 km (11 mi)	60.1 km (37.3 mi)	148.9 km (92.5 mi)	254.8 km (158.3 mi)
Chondhi	122.6 km (76.2 mi)	69.8 km (43.4 mi)	22.3 km (13.9 mi)	13.2 km (8.2 mi)	56.3 km (35.0 mi)	145.1 km (90.2 mi)	251 km (156 mi)
Chandwad Taluka
Kundalgaon	129.6 km (80.5 mi)	76.8 km (47.7 mi)	29.3 km (18.2 mi)	6.2 km (3.9 mi)	49.3 km (30.6 mi)	138.1 km (85.8 mi)	244 km (152 mi)
Dahegaon (Manmad)	134.2 km (83.4 mi)	81.4 km (50.6 mi)	33.9 km (21.1 mi)	1.6 km (0.99 mi)	44.7 km (27.8 mi)	133.5 km (83.0 mi)	239.4 km (148.8 mi)
Nandgaon Taluka
Manmad city	135.8 km (84.4 mi)	83 km (52 mi)	35.5 km (22.1 mi)	0 km (0 mi)	43.1 km (26.8 mi)	131.9 km (82.0 mi)	237.8 km (147.8 mi)
Anakwade	142.8 km (88.7 mi)	90 km (56 mi)	42.5 km (26.4 mi)	7 km (4.3 mi)	36.1 km (22.4 mi)	124.9 km (77.6 mi)	230.8 km (143.4 mi)
Yeola Taluka
Savargaon	155.1 km (96.4 mi)	102.3 km (63.6 mi)	54.8 km (34.1 mi)	19.3 km (12.0 mi)	23.8 km (14.8 mi)	112.6 km (70.0 mi)	218.5 km (135.8 mi)
Yeola city	162.9 km (101.2 mi)	110.1 km (68.4 mi)	62.6 km (38.9 mi)	27.1 km (16.8 mi)	16 km (9.9 mi)	104.8 km (65.1 mi)	210.7 km (130.9 mi)

=== Ahmadnagar District ===
Name	Distance						
Name	Dondaicha	Kusumbe	Malegaon	Manmad	Kopargaon	Ahmadnagar	Daund
Kopargaon Taluka
Yesgaon	173.7 km (107.9 mi)	120.9 km (75.1 mi)	73.4 km (45.6 mi)	37.9 km (23.5 mi)	5.2 km (3.2 mi)	94 km (58 mi)	199.9 km (124.2 mi)
Kopargaon	178.9 km (111.2 mi)	126.1 km (78.4 mi)	78.6 km (48.8 mi)	43.1 km (26.8 mi)	0 km (0 mi)	88.8 km (55.2 mi)	194.7 km (121.0 mi)
Savalvihir Bk.	189.6 km (117.8 mi)	136.8 km (85.0 mi)	89.3 km (55.5 mi)	53.8 km (33.4 mi)	10.7 km (6.6 mi)	78.1 km (48.5 mi)	184 km (114 mi)
Nimgaon	192 km (119 mi)	139.2 km (86.5 mi)	91.7 km (57.0 mi)	56.2 km (34.9 mi)	13.1 km (8.1 mi)	75.7 km (47.0 mi)	181.6 km (112.8 mi)
Shirdi	193.8 km (120.4 mi)	141 km (88 mi)	93.5 km (58.1 mi)	58 km (36 mi)	14.9 km (9.3 mi)	73.9 km (45.9 mi)	179.8 km (111.7 mi)
Sakuri	197.7 km (122.8 mi)	144.9 km (90.0 mi)	97.4 km (60.5 mi)	61.9 km (38.5 mi)	18.8 km (11.7 mi)	70 km (43 mi)	175.9 km (109.3 mi)
Rahata	199.9 km (124.2 mi)	147.1 km (91.4 mi)	99.6 km (61.9 mi)	64.1 km (39.8 mi)	21 km (13 mi)	67.8 km (42.1 mi)	173.7 km (107.9 mi)
Srirampur Taluka
Pimpri Nirmal	208.5 km (129.6 mi)	155.7 km (96.7 mi)	108.2 km (67.2 mi)	72.7 km (45.2 mi)	29.6 km (18.4 mi)	59.2 km (36.8 mi)	165.1 km (102.6 mi)
Bhalbaleshwar	213.6 km (132.7 mi)	160.8 km (99.9 mi)	113.3 km (70.4 mi)	77.8 km (48.3 mi)	34.7 km (21.6 mi)	54.1 km (33.6 mi)	160 km (99 mi)
Kolhar Budruk	220.6 km (137.1 mi)	167.8 km (104.3 mi)	120.3 km (74.8 mi)	84.8 km (52.7 mi)	41.7 km (25.9 mi)	47.1 km (29.3 mi)	153 km (95 mi)
Rahuri Taluka
Rampur	221.8 km (137.8 mi)	169 km (105 mi)	121.5 km (75.5 mi)	86 km (53 mi)	42.9 km (26.7 mi)	45.9 km (28.5 mi)	151.8 km (94.3 mi)
Guha	229 km (142 mi)	176.2 km (109.5 mi)	128.7 km (80.0 mi)	93.2 km (57.9 mi)	50.1 km (31.1 mi)	38.7 km (24.0 mi)	144.6 km (89.9 mi)
Rahuri	240 km (150 mi)	187.2 km (116.3 mi)	139.7 km (86.8 mi)	104.2 km (64.7 mi)	61.1 km (38.0 mi)	27.7 km (17.2 mi)	133.6 km (83.0 mi)
Ahmadnagar Taluka
Nandgaon	253.5 km (157.5 mi)	200.7 km (124.7 mi)	153.2 km (95.2 mi)	117.7 km (73.1 mi)	74.6 km (46.4 mi)	14.2 km (8.8 mi)	120.1 km (74.6 mi)
Shingwe	255.1 km (158.5 mi)	202.3 km (125.7 mi)	154.8 km (96.2 mi)	119.3 km (74.1 mi)	76.2 km (47.3 mi)	12.6 km (7.8 mi)	118.5 km (73.6 mi)
Dehre	258.8 km (160.8 mi)	206 km (128 mi)	158.5 km (98.5 mi)	123 km (76 mi)	79.9 km (49.6 mi)	8.9 km (5.5 mi)	114.8 km (71.3 mi)
Ahmednagar city	267.7 km (166.3 mi)	214.9 km (133.5 mi)	167.4 km (104.0 mi)	131.9 km (82.0 mi)	88.8 km (55.2 mi)	0 km (0 mi)	105.9 km (65.8 mi)
Arangaon	288.1 km (179.0 mi)	235.3 km (146.2 mi)	187.8 km (116.7 mi)	152.3 km (94.6 mi)	109.2 km (67.9 mi)	20.4 km (12.7 mi)	85.5 km (53.1 mi)
Khadki	295.7 km (183.7 mi)	242.9 km (150.9 mi)	195.4 km (121.4 mi)	159.9 km (99.4 mi)	116.8 km (72.6 mi)	28 km (17 mi)	77.9 km (48.4 mi)
Srigonda Taluka
Chikhali	304.7 km (189.3 mi)	251.9 km (156.5 mi)	204.4 km (127.0 mi)	168.9 km (104.9 mi)	125.8 km (78.2 mi)	37 km (23 mi)	68.9 km (42.8 mi)
Ghargaon	321.9 km (200.0 mi)	269.1 km (167.2 mi)	221.6 km (137.7 mi)	186.1 km (115.6 mi)	143 km (89 mi)	54.2 km (33.7 mi)	51.7 km (32.1 mi)
Loni Vyanknath	331.1 km (205.7 mi)	278.3 km (172.9 mi)	230.8 km (143.4 mi)	195.3 km (121.4 mi)	152.2 km (94.6 mi)	63.4 km (39.4 mi)	42.5 km (26.4 mi)
Madhewadgaon	336.9 km (209.3 mi)	284.1 km (176.5 mi)	236.6 km (147.0 mi)	201.1 km (125.0 mi)	158 km (98 mi)	69.2 km (43.0 mi)	36.7 km (22.8 mi)
Dhokraimala	340.1 km (211.3 mi)	287.3 km (178.5 mi)	239.8 km (149.0 mi)	204.3 km (126.9 mi)	161.2 km (100.2 mi)	72.4 km (45.0 mi)	33.5 km (20.8 mi)
Kashti	345.1 km (214.4 mi)	292.3 km (181.6 mi)	244.8 km (152.1 mi)	209.3 km (130.1 mi)	166.2 km (103.3 mi)	77.4 km (48.1 mi)	28.5 km (17.7 mi)
Nimgaon Khalu	352.5 km (219.0 mi)	299.7 km (186.2 mi)	252.2 km (156.7 mi)	216.7 km (134.7 mi)	173.6 km (107.9 mi)	84.8 km (52.7 mi)	21.1 km (13.1 mi)

=== Pune District ===
Name	Distance						
Name	Dondaicha	Kusumbe	Malegaon	Manmad	Kopargaon	Ahmadnagar	Daund
Daund Taluka
Daund	373.6 km (232.1 mi)	320.8 km (199.3 mi)	273.3 km (169.8 mi)	237.8 km (147.8 mi)	194.7 km (121.0 mi)	105.9 km (65.8 mi)	0 km (0 mi)

== See also ==
- List of state highways in Maharashtra
