= Ranjangaon Mashid =

Village in Maharashtra

- Village
- Interactive map of Ranjangaon Mashid
- Country: India
- State: Maharashtra
- District: Ahmadnagar

Government
  - Type: Panchayati raj (India)
  - Body: Gram panchayat

Languages
  - Official: Marathi
- Time zone: UTC+5:30 (IST)
- Telephone code: 02488
- ISO 3166 code: IN-MH
- Vehicle registration: MH-16
- Lok Sabha constituency: Ahmadnagar
- Vidhan Sabha constituency: Parner
- Website: maharashtra.gov.in

Ranjangaon Mashid is a village in Parner taluka in the Ahmednagar district of the state of Maharashtra, India.

== Religion ==
The majority of the village dwellers are Hindu Marathas, Hindu Mali, or Hindu chambhar as well as a smaller communities of Buddhists, Marwadis, and Muslims.

== Economy ==
The majority of the population has farming as their primary occupation. Trade is mostly dependent on farming of cash crops & milk.

== Road links ==
Ranjangaon is connected to Supa, it is one of the primary destinations on this Ahmadnagar-Pune highway. Ranjangaon is directly connected with Shrigonda, Shirur, Parner & Nagar Taluka.

== Railway links ==
Ranjangaon Road railway station is connected to cities like Shrigonda, Nagar, Daund and directly connected from Ahmadnagar through passenger trains. There are daily passenger shuttle services between Ahmadnagar to Ranjangaon.

== See also ==
- Parner taluka
- Villages in Parner taluka
