= Mehergaon =

Village in Maharashtra

- village
- Location in Maharashtra, India Mehergaon (India)
- Coordinates: 20°58′N 74°38′E
- Country: India
- State: Maharashtra

Languages
  - Official: Marathi
- Time zone: UTC+5:30 (IST)
- Vehicle registration: MH-
- Coastline: 0 kilometres (0 mi)
- Climate: Arid (Köppen)
- Avg. summer temperature: 48 °C (118 °F)
- Avg. winter temperature: 10 °C (50 °F)

Mehergaon is a small village in India, located in the north-west region of the state of Maharashtra. It is abounded by various places like Amalgaon on the East, Pingalwade on the West, Gandhali on the North and Ninbhora on the South. The postal pin code is 424002.

Mehergaon has recently received the "Ideal Village" award, which is an award given by the Maharashtra government.

== Demographics ==
Mehergaon hosts a population of less than 1000. The primary language is Ahirani.

== Climate ==
Mehergaon has a diverse climate. The temperature varies from 10 to 48 degrees Celsius. It is exceptionally hot and dry during summer with temperature reaching as high as 45 degrees Celsius.
