= Bahadur Fort =

Ancient Indian fort

Dharmveergad / Pedgaon Fort
- धर्मवीर गड/ पेडगाव चा किल्ला
- Ahmednagar district, Maharashtra
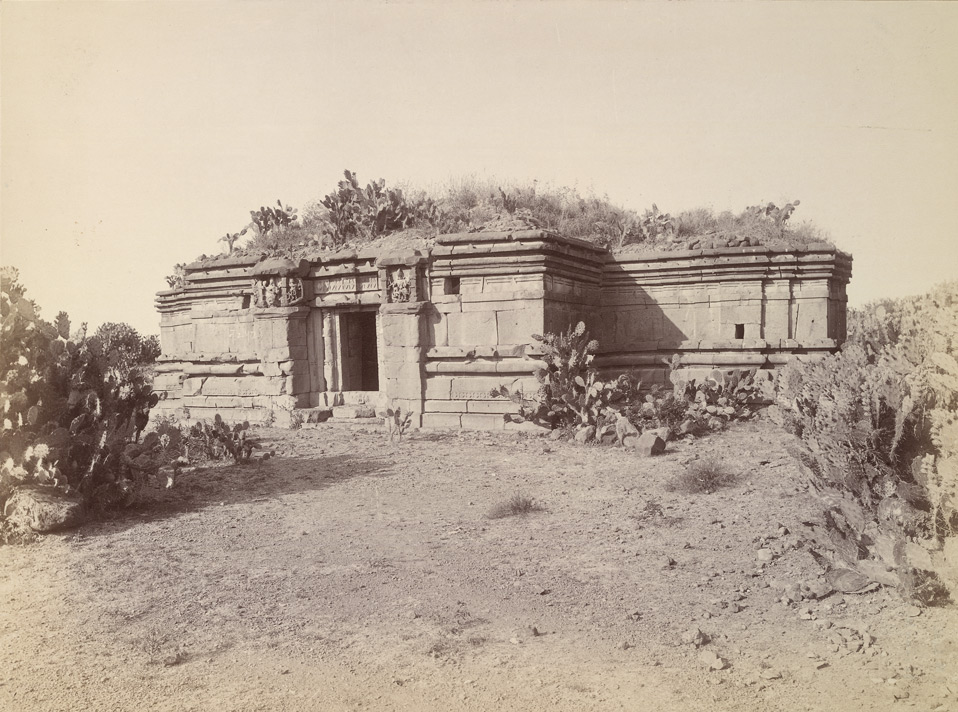
- Rameshvara Hindu Temple ruins within the fort premises

Site information
- Type: Land fort
- Owner: Government of India
- Controlled by: Maratha Empire (till 1637); Maratha Empire (1759-1818) United Kingdom: East India Company (1818-1857); British Raj (1857-1947); India (1947-)
- Open to the public: Yes
- Condition: Ruins

Location
- Shown within Maharashtra Dharmveergad / Pedgaon Fort (India)
- Coordinates: 18°30′28.63″N 74°42′14.88″E
- Height: 503 mt above msl

Site history
- Materials: Stone

Bahadurgad (Marathi: बहादूरगड, "Bahadur Fort") is a fort in the Pedgaon village of Ahmednagar district in Maharashtra, India.

== Location ==
The fort is located about 100 km from Pune. The nearest town is Daund. This fort lay about 15 km East of the Daund town on northern banks of River Bhima. The Fort is situated in the village Pedgaon.

== Places to see ==
The fort is rectangular in shape with two entrance gates. The gate towards the village is in good condition while that towards the river is in ruined state. There is a 5 feet tall Maruti/Hanuman statue inside the fort along with group of 5 temples which were constructed during Yadav period. The Hemadpanti architecture temples are of Baleshwar, Lakshmi-Narayan, Mallikarjun, Rameshwar and Bhairavnath. There are many heroic stones, Satigal, cannon balls, Deepmal and a statue of Shiva in front of the Bhairavnath temple.

== History ==
Very little is known of the history of the fort. During the Mughal Empire, Pedgaon was one of the chief stores and a frontier post of the Army of the Mughal Empire. In 1672, the then Deccan Viceroy, Khan Jahan, camped here and tried to pursue the Maratha army headed by Shivaji. Khan Jahan built water channels in order to bring water from the Bhima River. The Mot and the Persian wheel are well preserved till now. Khan Jahan renamed Pedgaon as Bahadurgad. This fort was captured by Shivaji by fooling the Mughal Chief. There is a 2 storied palace of Aurangzeb inside the fort. This the fort where Sambhaji Maharaj and Kavi Kalash were subjected to a horrific torture when they did not accept to be converted to Islam. Bahadurgad has been renamed as Dharmaveergad in the memory of Sambhaji raje. In 1759 Pedgaon was captured by Sadashivrao Bhau Peshwa, and remained with the Marathas till 1818.
