= Ruigavhan =

Village in Maharashtra

Ruigavhan is a village in the Ahmednagar District of Maharashtra, India. It is the only village in the Ruigavhan gram panchayat. Ruigavhan is 66.0 km from the main city, Ahmednagar, 124 km from Pune and 272 km from the state capital, Mumbai. The nearest towns are Shrigonda (20.3 km), Karjat (23.4 km), Bhigwan (53.8 km), and Jamkhed (54.3 km)
