= Dhawalgaon, Ahmednagar =

Village in Maharashtra

Dhawalgaon Dhawalgaon
- village
- Location in Maharashtra, India Dhawalgaon (India)
- Coordinates: 18°48′5.0544″N 074°28′40.335″E
- Country: India
- State: Maharashtra
- District: Ahmadnagar
- Taluka: Shrigonda

Government
  - Body: Village panchayat

Population (2011)
  - Total: 2,343

Languages
  - Official: Marathi
- Time zone: UTC+5:30 (IST)
- Vehicle registration: MH-16
- Nearest town: Shrigonda
- Website: www.shrigonda.in/dhawalgaon.htm

Dhawalgaon is a panchayat village in the state of Maharashtra, India. Administratively, Dhawalgaon is under Shrigonda Taluka of Ahmadnagar District in Maharashtra. There is only the single village of Dhawalgaon in the Dhawalgaon gram panchayat.

== Demographics ==
In the 2011 census, the village of Dhawalgaon had 2,343 inhabitants, with 1,229 males (52%) and 1,114 females (48%), for a gender ratio of 906 females per thousand males.
