= Pisore Khand =

Village in Maharashtra

Coordinates: 18°44′N 74°47′E

Pisore Khand is a Town Panchayat (T.P.) in the Shrigonda taluka block of the Ahmednagar district in the Indian State of Maharashtra. The original name of the village was Pisore, but this name was changed to Pisore Khand to distinguish it from another village in the same block. A historical palace remains, built by Ahilyabai Holker of the Holker Family of King Pan Pohi.

== Geography ==
Its area was 1348 hectares. Pisore Khand is surrounded by hills to the east and north and open land to its west and south. Surrounding villages include Bhangaon to the west, Takali to the east; Khandgaon to the north and Devulgaon to the south.

The village contains seven ponds built by the government as part of the Rural Employment Plan enacted during the 1972 drought.

== Temples ==
Pisore Khand includes two ancient temples: the Kongjai temple on Kongjai Hill, situated to the north of the village; and Nawlai on the Hill of Nawlai, east of the village. Bhairavnath temple, Maruti temple, shiva Temple, Vitthal Rukhmini Temple in village while Khakibaba Darga situated at boundary of Pisore Khand at the bottom of Hill.

== Demographics ==
At the time of the 2001 census, 426 families lived in the village, comprising a total population of 2207 (1124 males and 1083 females). The population of children aged zero to six was 292 (135 male and 155 female). Children aged zero to six make up 13.23% of the total population of the village.
