= Pargaon Sudrik =

Village in Maharashtra

Pargaon Sudrik is a panchayat village in the state of Maharashtra, India. Administratively, Pargaon Sudrik is under Shrigonda Taluka of Ahmednagar District in Maharashtra. There is only the single village of Pargaon sudrik in the Pargaon sudrik gram panchayat.

The village of Pargaon Sudrik is on the left bank of the Saraswati River, and on the west bank of the Sudrikeswar Dam River. Three roads leave the village. To the east is the Loni Vyankanath Road that connects, to the south is State Highway 50 and to the north is State Highway 50. To the west there is the Vadali road that passes through the villages of Vadali, Belwani & Kothar. The other southern road going to Shrigonda is 7 km north of the Belwaandi railway station.

The village has many temples which are collectively known as one of many Sudrikeswar temples.
