= Shrigonda Municipal Council =

Government body in Ahmednagar, Maharashtra, India

Type
- Type: Municipal Council of the Shrigonda

History
- Founded: 1996

Leadership
- President: Shubhangi Pote
- Seats: 19

Elections
- Last election: 28-January-2019

Shrigonda is a Municipal council city in Ahmednagar District in the Indian state of Maharashtra.

== Governance ==
Shrigonda is a Municipal Council city in district of Ahmadnagar, Maharashtra. The city is divided into 17 wards for which elections are held every 5 years.

== Demographics ==
The area has a population of 31,134 of which 16,048 are men while 15,086 are women according to the 2011 census of India.

== Municipal Council election ==
Electoral performance 2019
S.No.	Party name	Alliance	Party flag or symbol	Number of Corporators
01	Shiv Sena (SS)	NDA		00
02	Bharatiya Janata Party (BJP)	NDA		11
03	Indian National Congress (INC)	UPA		06
04	Nationalist Congress Party (NCP)	UPA		02
