= Kasti, Maharashtra =

Village in Maharashtra

Kashti Kashti
- village
- Location in Maharashtra, India Kashti (India)
- Coordinates: 18°32′57″N 074°34′56″E
- Country: India
- State: Maharashtra
- District: Ahmadnagar
- Taluka: Shrigonda

Government
  - Body: Village panchayat

Population (2011)
  - Total: 14,235

Languages
  - Official: Marathi
- Time zone: UTC+5:30 (IST)
- ISO 3166 code: IN-MH
- Website: www.shrigonda.in/kasti.htm

Kashti is a panchayat village in the state of Maharashtra, India, on the left (east) bank of the Ghod River, across the river from the village of Tandali. Administratively, Kashti is under Shrigonda Taluka of Ahmadnagar District in Maharashtra. There is only the single village of Kasti in the Kashti gram panchayat. The railroad station is 5 km by road south of the village. Kasti is 16 km by road southwest of the town of Shrigonda, and 14 km by road north of the town of Daund.

== Demographics ==
In the 2001 census, the village of Kasti had 12,866 inhabitants, with 6,677 males (51.9%) and 6,189 females (48.1%), for a gender ratio of 927 females per thousand males.

In the 2011 census, Kasti reported 14,235 inhabitants.
