= Ajnale =

Village in Maharashtra

- village
- Location in Maharashtra, India Ajnale (India)
- Coordinates: 20.82°N 74.59°E
- Country: India
- State: Maharashtra
- District: Dhule
- Talukas: Dhule

Population (2001)
  - Total: 871

Languages
  - Official: Marathi
- Time zone: UTC+5:30 (IST)

Ajnale is a small village in the state of Maharashtra, India. It is located in the Dhule taluka of Dhule District in Maharashtra.

== Location ==
Ajnale is located on the Maharashtra State Highway 10 (MH SH 10).

== Demographics ==
As of 2001 census, Ajnale had a population of 871 with 436 males and 435 females. Males constitute 50% of the population and females 50%. Ajnale has an average literacy rate of 0%, lower than the national average of 59.5%. Male Literacy is 0%, and female literacy is 0%. In Ajnale, 7.57% of the population is under 6 years of age. Ajnale has an average birth rate of 0% and an average death rate of 0%.

There are total of 173 households in the village and the village border area is spread in the area of 1,612 hectares.

== Administration ==
Ajnale has as Village Gram Panchayat for day-to-day administration. The District Zilla Panchayat headquarters is at Dhule and the Block Panchayat is also at Dhule.

Ajnale has no commercial banks, co-operative banks, agricultural credit societies, non-agricultural credit societies or other credit societies present within the village.

== Transport ==
=== Rail ===
Ajnale has no railway station of its own, the closest railway station is Dhule which is 14 mi (23 km) from the village.

=== Road ===
Ajnale is connected by the State Transport Buses that ply between Dhule, Kusumba & Malegaon.

=== Air ===
Ajnale has no airport of its own, the closest airport is at Dhule.

== See also ==
- Dhule City
- Dhule District
- List of villages in Dhule District
- List of districts of Maharashtra
- Maharashtra
