= Ranjangaon Road railway station =

Railway station in Ranjangaon Mashid, India

General information
- Location: Ranjangaon Mashid, Ahmadnagar district, Maharashtra; India
- Coordinates: 18.8782°N 74.6070°E
- Elevation: 668 metres (2,192 ft)
- System: Indian Railways station
- Owner: Indian Railways
- Line: Daud–Ahmadnagar line
- Platforms: 1
- Tracks: 3
- Connections: Auto stand

Construction
- Structure type: Standard (on-ground station)
- Parking: No
- Cycle facilities: No

Other information
- Status: Functioning
- Station code: RNJD
- Zone(s): Central Railway
- Division(s): Solapur
Location
- Location within India Location within Maharashtra

Ranjangaon Road railway station is a small railway station in Ahmadnagar district, Maharashtra. Its code is RNJD. It serves Ranjangaon Mashid village. This village in Parner Taluka of Ahmadnagar district. The station consists of one platform. The platform is not well sheltered. It lacks many facilities including water and sanitation.

== Trains ==
- Manmad–Pune Passenger
- Daund–Hazur Sahib Nanded Passenger
- Pune–Nizamabad Passenger
