= Pedgaon, Ahmednagar =

Village in Maharashtra

Pedgaon Pedagaon
- village
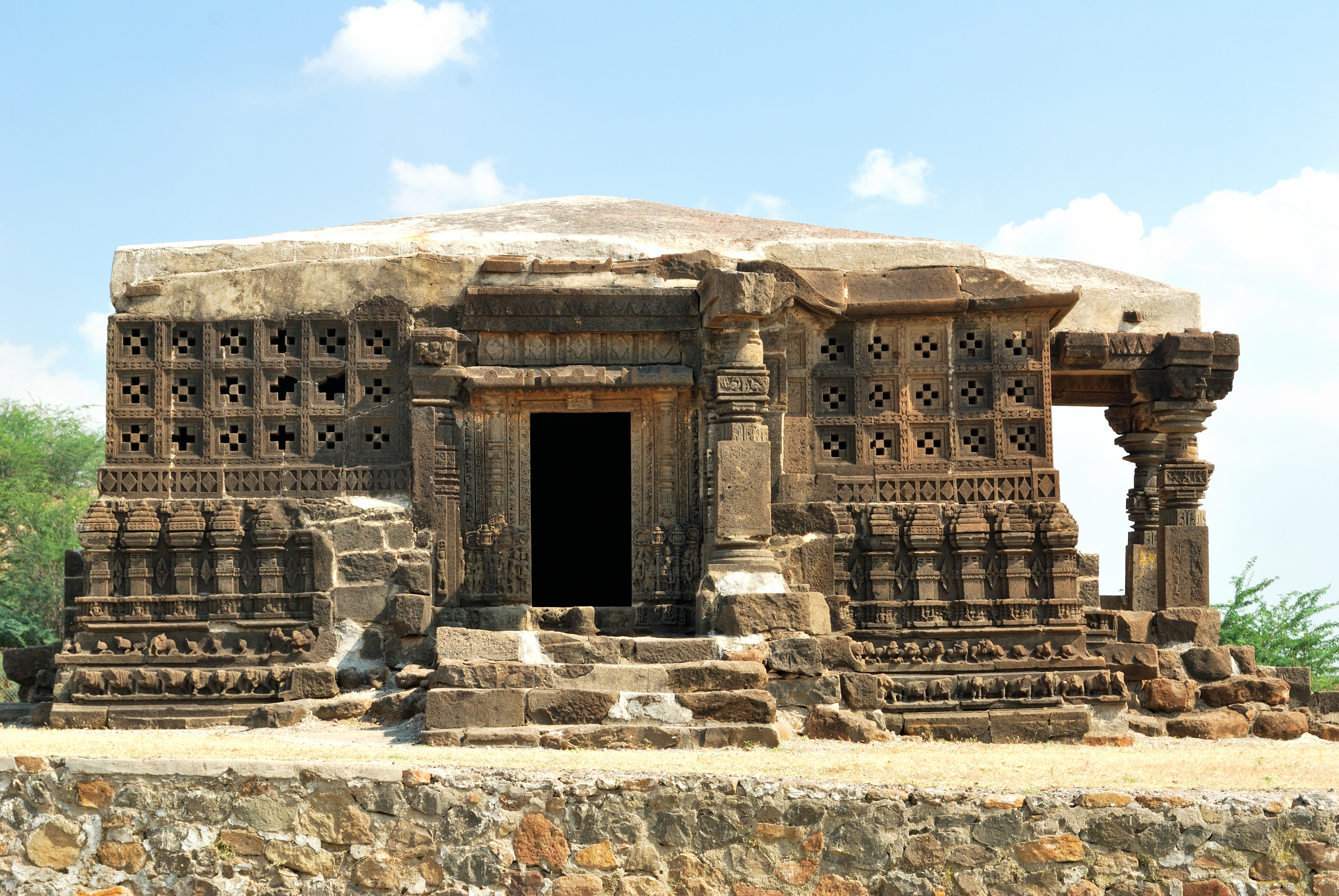
- Baleshwar temple at Pedgaon

- Location in Maharashtra, India Pedgaon (India)
- Coordinates: 18°30′42″N 074°42′27″E
- Country: India
- State: Maharashtra
- District: Ahmadnagar
- Taluka: Shrigonda

Government
  - Body: Village panchayat

Population (2001)
  - Total: 4,672

Languages
  - Official: Marathi
- Time zone: UTC+5:30 (IST)
- Vehicle registration: MH-16
- Nearest town: Shrigonda

Pedgaon is a panchayat village in the state of Maharashtra, India. Administratively, Pedgaon falls under the Shrigonda Taluka of Ahmadnagar District, Maharashtra. Pedgaon is the only village within the Pedgaon Gram Panchayat.

The village of Pedgaon is located on the left (north) bank of the Bhima River and the west bank of the Deo River, the latter being an intermittent stream, flowing only during the monsoon season.

Three roads connect Pedgaon to nearby areas. To the east, the Anandwadi Road connects to State Highway 67 to the south and State Highway 55 to the north. To the west, a road passes through the villages of Ajnuj, Kautha, and Gar before reaching State Highway 10 and the Bhima River bridge. Another road to the west heads northwest to Kasti. Pedgaon is located 13 km east of the Kasti railway station by road and 22 km south of Shrigonda. The village lacks hotels or lodges for visitors.

Pedgaon is home to a historic fort known as the Fort of Pedgaon or Bahadurgad (also called "Dharmaveergad"). The fort is largely in ruins but includes notable structures such as the Mastani Mahal. Within the fort, there are five temples, with the Lakshmi Narayan temple and Baleshwar temple being the most prominent. The Lakshmi Narayan temple is an architectural example with intricately carved pillars and animal images on the walls, although the temple currently lacks any images. The Baleshwar temple, dedicated to Lord Shiv, is also in a ruined state but still features eight beautifully carved pillars.

Fish farming is practiced in Pedgaon, particularly in the Bhima River. Additionally, the Saraswati River flows from Shrigonda through Chorachiwadi and meets the Bhima River in Pedgaon.

== Bahadurgad Incident ==
The Bahadurgad Incident is a well-documented example of Chhatrapati Shivaji Maharaj's military acumen and his use of deception in warfare during the establishment of the Maratha Empire.

=== Background ===
During the mid-17th century, Chhatrapati Shivaji Maharaj received intelligence that a consignment of 200 high-quality Arab horses, along with substantial riches, had arrived at the Bahadurgad fort, located in Pedgaon. At the time, the fort was under the command of Bahadur Khan, a Mughal officer.

=== The Plan ===
Recognizing the value of these horses and riches, Chhatrapati Shivaji Maharaj devised a strategy to seize them from the well-guarded fort. He assembled a force of 9,000 Maratha soldiers and divided them into two contingents: one comprising 2,000 soldiers and the other of 7,000 soldiers.

The plan involved deliberately leaking information about a Maratha raid on Bahadurgad, intending for Bahadur Khan to become aware of it. The smaller force of 2,000 soldiers was instructed to attack the fort directly, using the main gate as their entry point.

=== Execution ===
As anticipated, Bahadur Khan, having learned of the supposed Maratha attack, left the main gate of the fort open and prepared his forces for defense. When the 2,000 Maratha soldiers launched their attack, the Mughal forces responded aggressively. However, instead of engaging in a prolonged battle, the Marathas began a strategic retreat.

Bahadur Khan, believing that he had gained the upper hand, ordered his troops to pursue the retreating Marathas, leaving the fort largely undefended. This maneuver was exactly what Chhatrapati Shivaji Maharaj had intended.

=== The Outcome ===
With Bahadur Khan and his forces in pursuit of the retreating Marathas, the larger contingent of 7,000 Maratha soldiers swiftly attacked the now undefended Bahadurgad fort. They successfully captured the 200 Arab horses and the riches before making a rapid escape.

The Mughal forces, led by Bahadur Khan, were unable to catch the retreating Marathas, who were known for their speed and the highly mobile nature of their operations. As a result, the Marathas secured a decisive victory through strategic deception, without the need for a large-scale battle.

=== Significance ===
The Bahadurgad Incident is often cited as a classic example of Chhatrapati Shivaji Maharaj's innovative military tactics. His ability to outmaneuver and outthink larger and better-equipped forces became a hallmark of the Maratha military strategy, contributing significantly to the expansion and consolidation of the Maratha Empire.

== Demographics ==
In the 2018 census, the village of Pedgaon had 8000 inhabitants, with 4500males (50.9%) and 3500females (49.1%), for a gender ratio of 964 females per thousand males.
