= Gandhali =

Village in Maharashtra

- village
- Location in Maharashtra, India Gandhali (India)
- Coordinates: 21.104°N 75.105°E
- Country: India
- State: Maharashtra
- District: Jalgaon

Government
  - Body: Gram Panchayat

Population (2001)
  - Total: 2,640
- PIN: 425420
- Literacy: 75%
- Lok Sabha constituency: Jalgaon Gramin
- Civic agency: Gram Panchayat

Gadhali is a village in Jalgaon district of Maharashtra, India. It is located in the Amalner taluka. In 2001, it had a population of 2640.
