= Amalgaon =

Village in Maharashtra

- village
- Location in Maharashtra, India Amalgaon (India)
- Coordinates: 21°7′46.2″N 75°6′57.29″E
- Country: India
- State: Maharashtra
- District: Jalgaon

Government
  - Body: grampanchayat

Population
  - Total: 7,000

Languages
  - Official: Marathi
- Time zone: UTC+5:30 (IST)
- Vehicle registration: MH-
- Coastline: 0 kilometres (0 mi)
- Nearest city: Amalner 12km
- Civic agency: grampanchayat
- Climate: mostly dry and very hot (Köppen)
- Avg. summer temperature: 45 °C (113 °F)

Amalgaon is an average sized village on the north side of the Indian city of Amalner.

It has a primary health centre and a telephone exchange tower. This village has educational facilities up to 12th grade. Population is around 6,000 (as of 2008).

The Chikhali River flows around the south west part of the village. People in this village speak Ahirani, Marathi and Hindi. Amalgaon has an active Gram Panchayat or local government. People in this village are very active in political activities and contribute in district politics. For example, Panchayat Samit, Zilha Parishad, Shetaki Sangh etc.

In this village there is a branch office of the Jalgaon District Central Co-operative Bank, which plays very important role in financial matters of the farmers. This village also has a post office. Amalgaon's zipcode is 425 420. Telephone area code is 02587.

Ninety percent of people are engaged in farming. Farming here is mostly dry and traditional but a few people have started drip irrigation. Most common crops here are cotton, mug, jawar, bajra and corn. There are many other small businesses which are closely related to farming. Amalgaon also has potteries that manufacture clay pots which are used for storing drinking water.

In June 2006, this village suffered a flood. The high school and some of the houses were destroyed. However, the people in this village rebuilt their high school by collecting money by contributing. There is a dam near Amalgaon which has been under in construction for the last 25 to 27 years. Once this dam is completed all of the local farms will benefit. Local farmers and also other neighbouring villages' farmers have often protested at Tahashil Office in Taluka about the delays.
