= Daund =

- City
- Location in Maharashtra, India
- Coordinates: 18°27′47″N 74°34′44″E
- Country: India
- State: Maharashtra
- District: Pune
- Named for: Dhaumya Rishi

Government
  - Body: Municipality
- Elevation: 514 m (1,686 ft)

Population (2018)
  - Total: 590,025

Languages
  - Official: Marathi
- Time zone: UTC+5:30 (IST)
- PIN: 413801 and 413802
- Telephone code: 02117
- Vehicle registration: MH 12,42
- Website: www.punediary.com/html/Daund.html

Daund is a city, municipal council, and headquarters of the Daund tehsil in the Pune district in the state of Maharashtra, India. The city of Daund is located on the Bhima River.

In ancient times, a sage named Dhaumya Rishi stayed here; hence, people started calling it after him: "Dhaum". Gradually "Dhaum" became "Dhoand", then "Dhaundh". According to the epic Mahabharata, Krishna's wife Rukmini went in the "Dhindir forest"; this ancient "Dhindir Van" is today's Daund.

== History ==
=== Maratha era ===
Shahaji, father of Chhatrapati Shivaji Maharaj, was a sardar in the Nizam Shahi. He was granted Daund as a jagir, which included Bahadurgad, a fort in Pedgaon on the banks of the Bhima River (which still exists today).

=== Peshwa era ===
In 1739, the Bajirao–Mastani affair had brought clashes among the Peshwa family, hence Bajirao Peshwa took Mastani away from Pune and made her stay in Patas. Henceforth, Bajirao and Mastani met at the Firangai Devi temple in Kurkumbh.

The horse business in Daund flourished during this time. The water of the rivers Bhima, Nira, Pravara, Ghod, and Godavari were believed to be best suited for horses, and that the horses raised drinking these waters would be strong, quick, and loyal. The area of Bhimthadi, which is close to Daund, was known for its good horse breeds, and people preferred buying ponies from there exclusively.

Due to heavy loans at the end of the Peshwa Era, Daund and some villages from Pune fell under control of 'Girgosavi'.

=== British rule ===
In the 1850s, with the construction of railways during British rule, the Bombay–Chennai broad-gauge track passed via Daund, and the Daund–Baramati metre-gauge track was constructed. Daund became a junction after the broad-gauge Daund–Manmad connection was established. In 1928, Daund was connected to Srigonda when the bridge over Bhima River was constructed. A receiver station of the Imperial Wireless Chain was installed three kilometers outside the town.

From 1942 to 1945, two military camps were set up in Daund.

== Geography and climate ==
Bhima river and bridge near Daund

Daund is located at 18.47°N 74.6°E, about 514 m (1,686 ft) above sea level on the western margin of the Deccan Plateau. The town and surrounding area have mostly flat terrain, with hills rising 600 m (2,000 ft) to the south near Kurkumbh. Daund is located on the southern bank of Bhima River, a major river in Maharashtra. The Ujani reservoir on the river is around 25 km (16 mi) southeast of the town.

Daund lies very close to the seismically active zone around Koyna Dam, about 130 km (81 mi) southeast of the town, and has been rated as Zone 3 (on a scale of 2 to 5, with 5 being the most prone to earthquakes) by the India Meteorological Department.

The climate of Daund is generally hot and dry, and the area receives scant rainfall.

== Economy ==
Primary crops include wheat, sugar cane, oranges, and sweet limes. Daund has a large working class population, and the primary occupation is farming. Maharashtra Industrial Development Corporation is a major employer. Daund is currently being developed as a hub for pharmaceutical industries, and currently has facilities of companies such as Cipla, Emcure Pharmaceuticals, and Dia Ichi.

== Transportation ==
=== Roads ===
National Highway 160 passes through Daund, and National Highway 65 is just 9 km (5.6 mi) north of town. It is also on the Sinner–Shirdi–A.Nagar–Daund–Phaltan–Vita–Miraj–Chikodi route.

Daund–Ausa SH 67 also passes through Daund city. MSRTC buses are available to Pune, Mumbai, Aurangabad, Ahmednagar, Sangli, Miraj, Shirdi, Tuljapur, Satara, Beed, Jamkhed, and Karjat.

=== Rail ===
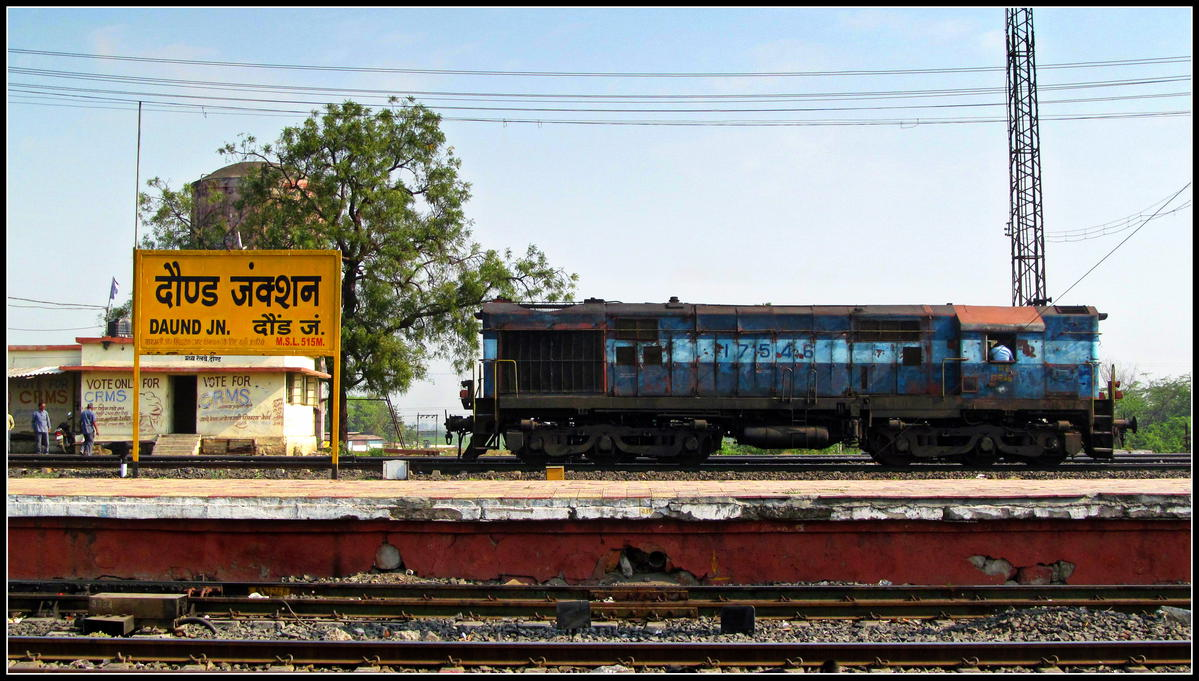
Daund Junction railway station

Daund is served by rail by the Daund Junction and the Daund Chord Line, which are managed by the Pune railway division of the Central Railway. Daund Junction lies on the Mumbai–Chennai line, Daund–Manmad line, and the Daund–Baramati branch line. Daund Chord Line lies on a short line which connects Mumbai–Chennai line and Daund–Manmad line.

Daund is a major freight redistribution hub.

== Demographics ==
As of 2011 India Census, Daund had a population of 49,450 of which 25,117 were males and 24,333 were females. There were 5,721 children below 6 years old. Daund had an average literacy rate of 77.34%, higher than the national average of 74.04%. Male literacy was 80.44% and female literacy was 74.13%.

The town has a significant population working as employees of Indian Railways and the State Reserve Police Force (SRPF).

== Religious sites ==
Since more than 82% of the city's population are Hindus, there are a significant number of temples in the town. Important Hindu temples in Daund include Shree Vitthal Rukmini Temple (प्रति पंढरपूर), Shree Balaji temple, Shree Gajanan Maharaj Temple, and Shree Swami Samarth Temple. The Gram Daivat of Daund is Shree Bhairavnath Maharaj Temple. Shree Firangai Mata temple, located 10 km from Daund at Kurkumbh, is the first of the 51 Shakti Pithas. Devotees from all over Maharashtra, Madhya Pradesh, and Karnataka visit the temple. Rama Navami is a large religious event, in which a sculpture of Lord Rama is carried throughout the town on a palanquin.

The town has a Jain Digambara temple known as the "1008 Chandraprabhu Bhagwan Mandir", which is known for its architecture and lack of iron in construction. The temple is built of marble and has a marble manastambha. It is located on Ahmednagar Road.
