= Shrigonda taluka =

Shrigonda Taluka
- Tehsil
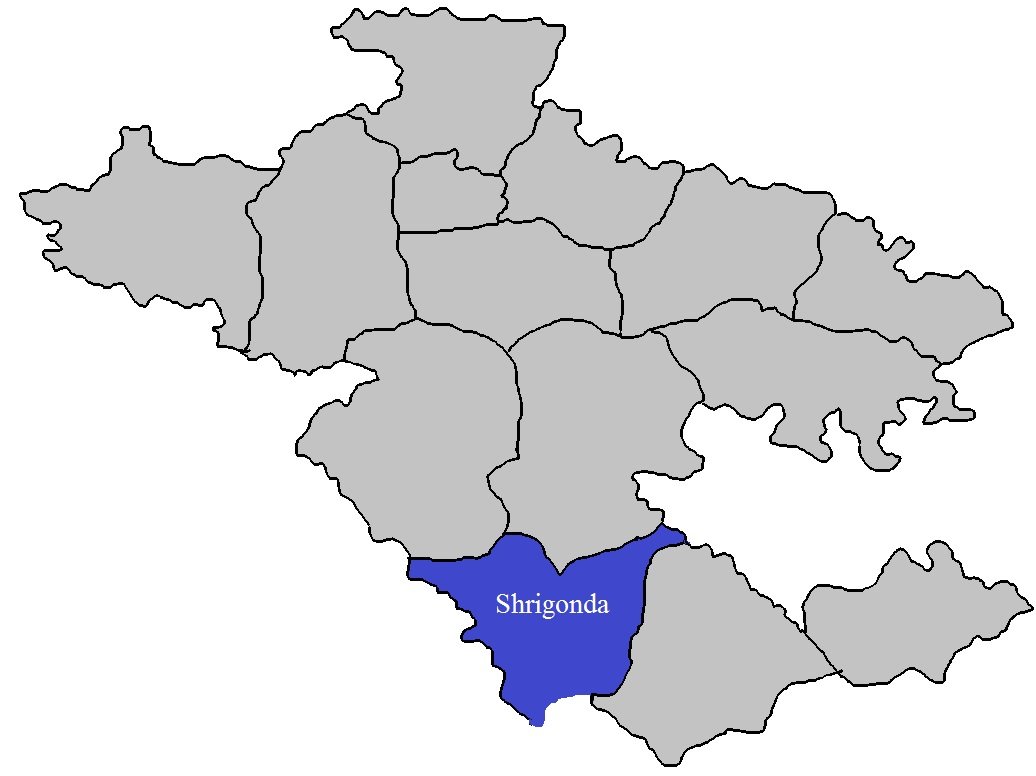
- Location of Shrigonda Taluka in Ahmednagar district in Maharashtra
- Country: India
- State: Maharashtra
- District: Ahmednagar
- Headquarters: Shrigonda
- Major villages: Kolgaon, Kashti, shedgaon Belavandi, Mandavgan Pargaon

Government
  - Lok Sabha constituency: Ahmednagar (Lok Sabha constituency)
  - Assembly constituency: Shrigonda
  - MLA: [[Vikram Babanrao Pachpute]]

Area
  - Total: 1,605.61 km^{2} (619.93 sq mi)

Population (2011)
  - Total: 315,975
  - Density: 196.794/km^{2} (509.695/sq mi)
- Rain: 448.6 mm

Shrigonda Taluka, is a taluka in Karjat subdivision of Ahmednagar District in Maharashtra state of India. Its administrative headquarters is the town of Shrigonda.

== Area ==
The table below shows area of the taluka by land type.

Type of Land	Area (km^{2})	% of Total Area
Agriculture	1385.16	86.27
Forest	152.1	9.47
Other	68.35	4.26
Total	1605.61	100

== Villages ==
There are around 115 villages in Shrigonda taluka.

== Population ==
Religions in Shrigonda taluk (2011)
Religion	Percent
Hinduism	95.19%
Islam	3.42%
Buddhism	0.56%
Jainism	0.45%
Other or not stated	0.38%

Shrigonda taluka has a population of 315,975 according to the 2011 census. Shrigonda had a literacy rate of 76.25% and a sex ratio of 923 females per 1000 males. 31,134 (9.85%) live in urban areas. Scheduled Castes and Scheduled Tribes make up 12.72% and 4.39% of the population respectively.

Languages of Shrigonda taluk (2011)
1. Marathi (93.8%)
2. Hindi (3.10%)
3. Others (3.07%)

At the time of the 2011 Census of India, 93.83% of the population in the district spoke Marathi and 3.10% Hindi as their first language.

== Rain Fall ==
The Table below details of rainfall from year 1981 to 2004.

Year	Rainfall (mm)
1981	614
1982	438
1983	521.6
1984	496
1985	359
1986	460
1987	497
1988	531
1989	610
1990	614
1991	438
1992	521.6
1993	496
1994	359
1995	460
1996	497
1997	531
1998	610
1999	571
2000	392
2001	352
2002	334
2003	87
2004	527
2005	484
2006	505
2007	675
2008	448
2009	499
2010	710
2011	326

== See also ==
- Talukas in Ahmednagar district
- Villages in Shrigonda taluka
