= Shrigonda =

- city
- Location in Maharashtra, India Shrigonda (Maharashtra)
- Coordinates: 18.616°N 74.698°E
- Country: India
- State: Maharashtra
- District: Ahmednagar

Government
  - Body: Municipal Council
- Elevation: 561 m (1,841 ft)

Population (2011)
  - Total: 31,134

Languages
  - Official: Marathi
- Time zone: UTC+5:30 (IST)
- PIN: 413701
- Telephone code: 912487
- Vehicle registration: MH-16

Shrigonda is a municipal council in Ahilyanagar - Ahmednagar district in the Indian state of Maharashtra. Shrigonda is located at 18.616°N 74.698°E. It has an average elevation of 561 metres (1840 feet). As of the 2001 Indian census, Shrigonda had a population of 26,331. Males constitute 52% of the population and females 48%. Shrigonda has an average literacy rate of 71%, higher than the national average of 59.5%: male literacy is 77%, and female literacy is 64%. In Shrigonda, 12% of the population is under 6 years of age.

== See also ==
- Shrigonda Municipal Council
- Ahmednagar district
